= Chrysothrix citrinella =

Scientific classification
- Kingdom: Fungi
- Division: Ascomycota
- Class: Arthoniomycetes
- Order: Arthoniales
- Family: Chrysotrichaceae
- Genus: Chrysothrix
- Species: C. citrinella

Binomial name
- Chrysothrix citrinella Aptroot & M.Cáceres (2017)
- Holotype: Poço Azul, Brazil

Species of lichen

Chrysothrix citrinella is a species of saxicolous (rock-dwelling) crustose lichen in the family Chrysotrichaceae. It was first described in 2017 by the lichenologists André Aptroot and Marcela Cáceres based on specimens collected from sandstone surfaces in northern Brazil.

== Taxonomy ==
Chrysothrix citrinella was formally described from a collection made in October 2016 at Poço Azul ("blue well", a natural swimming hole surrounded by forested areas), Riachão, Maranhão, Brazil. The specific epithet citrinella alludes to its bright citrine-yellow colouration, a characteristic that distinguishes it from related species.

== Description ==
The lichen has a crustose thallus composed of small, tightly attached microsquamules, ranging from 0.05 to 0.6 mm in diameter, bright citrine yellow in colour. The surface of these microsquamules partly breaks down into soredia, which measure about 40–55 μm in diameter, giving the thallus a distinctly powdery appearance.

Chemically, C. citrinella contains the compound calycin, identifiable by specific chemical spot tests that produce an orange reaction with potassium hydroxide solution (K+ orange) and para-phenylenediamine (P+ orange). It also has a characteristic dark orange fluorescence under ultraviolet light.

=== Similar species ===
This species is closely related to Chrysothrix granulosa, Chrysothrix placodioides, and Chrysothrix candelaris, all of which share similar chemistry. However, C. citrinella is distinct due to its microsquamulose thallus that breaks down into regular soredia. Unlike C. granulosa, it is relatively thin and does not easily detach intact from its substrate. It also differs from C. placodioides, which lacks soredia, and from C. candelaris, which lacks a microsquamulose structure.

== Habitat and distribution ==
At the time of its original publication, Chrysothrix citrinella was only known from its type locality in Maranhão, Brazil, where it grows on sandstone in Cerrado vegetation. It appears to prefer this specific substrate and is locally abundant at this location.
