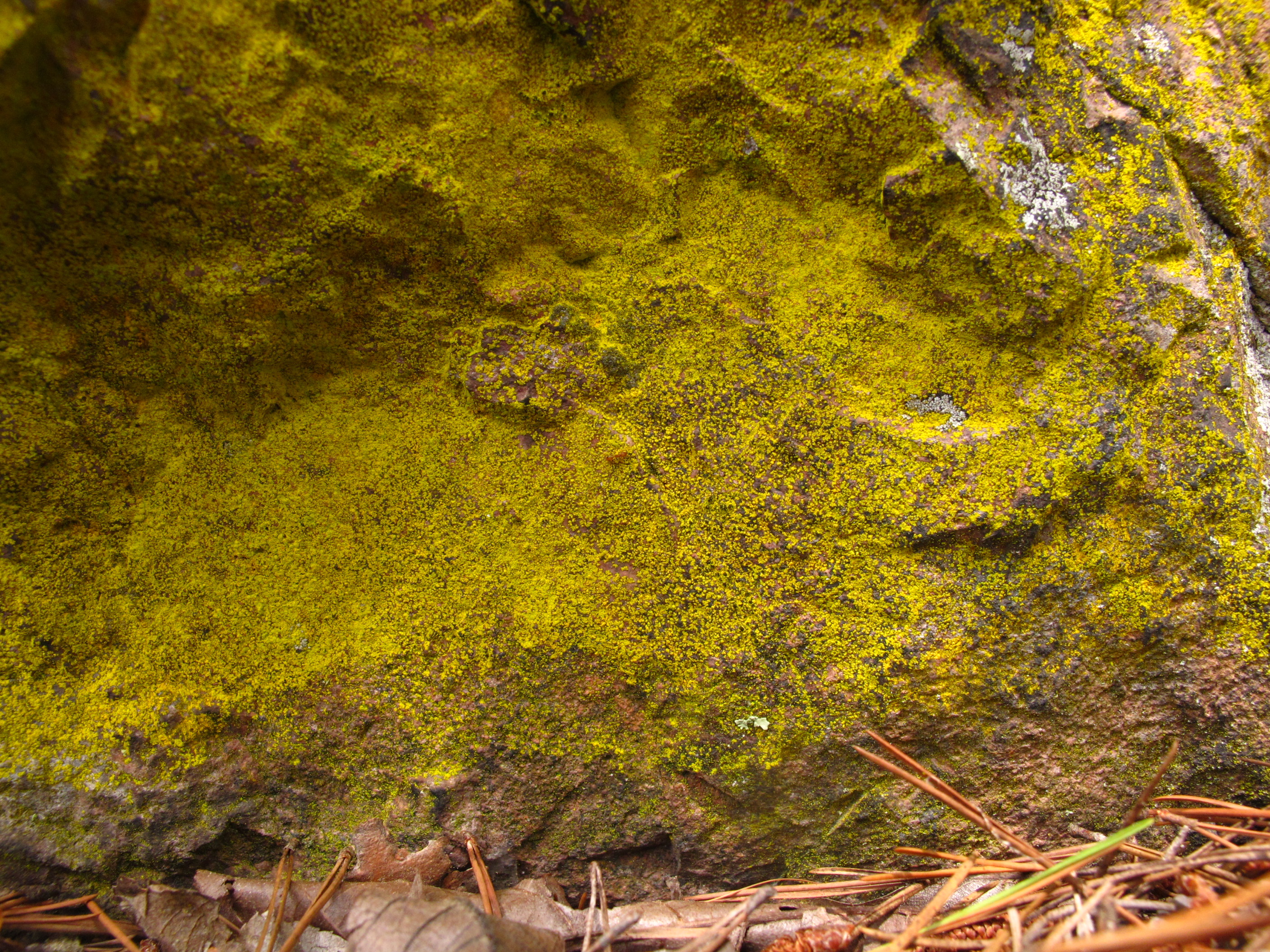
- on red granite

Scientific classification
- Kingdom: Fungi
- Division: Ascomycota
- Class: Arthoniomycetes
- Order: Arthoniales
- Family: Chrysotrichaceae
- Genus: Chrysothrix
- Species: C. insulizans

Binomial name
- Chrysothrix insulizans R.C.Harris & Ladd (2008)

= Chrysothrix insulizans =

Species of lichen-forming fungus

Chrysothrix insulizans is a species of leprose lichen in the family Chrysotrichaceae. It is a distinctive species of lichen characterized by its bright yellow-green to yellow-orange coloring and unique growth patterns. Most collections have been found growing on rocks, although a few have been recorded growing on bark.

== Taxonomy ==
Chrysothrix insulizans was first discovered in Missouri's Shannon County. Found within the Ozark National Scenic Riverway's Prairie Hollow Gorge Natural Area, the type specimen was collected on a shaded rhyolite face under a massive overhang on a west-facing slope. The lichen was formally described as a new species in 2008 by lichenologists Richard C. Harris and Douglas Ladd. The species name insulizans ("island-forming") reflects the lichen's tendency to form isolated, soralium-like patches. The new species was distinct from its closest relatives due to its thin, often discontinuous thallus, and unique chemical composition.

== Description ==
Chrysothrix insulizans has a crustose, leprose thallus that is thin to moderately thick and brightly colored. The unstratified and adherent thallus forms small, round or irregular soralium-like colonies, which can expand into larger continuous patches. The granules are farinose and spherical, with diameters between 20 and 50 μm. Both apothecia and pycnidia, typical reproductive structures in lichens, are not observed in this species. The lichen's photobiont is chlorococcoid, measuring between 9–14 μm across. On a chemical level, it tests positive for calycin and possibly leprapinic acid.

Chrysothrix galapagoana, found in the Galapagos Islands, is somewhat similar to Chrysothrix insulizans, and also produces calycin. It is distinguished by its larger granules (typically 170–250 μm in diameter), the presence of a distinctly pseudo-areolate thallus, and the lack of an unidentified secondary substance. Chrysothrix bergeri is lookalike with similar secondary chemistry and distribution, but it is distinguished from C. insulizans by its continuous thallus and corticolous substrate preference.

== Habitat and distribution ==
Chrysothrix insulizans can be found primarily on non-calcareous rocks, in both shaded and exposed situations. It is most prevalent in the southeastern United States and the Ozarks region. The species is frequently collected from sandstone, but can also be found on rhyolite, granite, and cherty dolomites. While initially thought to only inhabit rocks, some specimens have been found on bark, indicating broader substrate preferences than originally assumed. These findings, especially those from Maine and Michigan, suggest there may be another distinct taxon related to Chrysothrix insulizans, which could require molecular methods for definitive classification.
