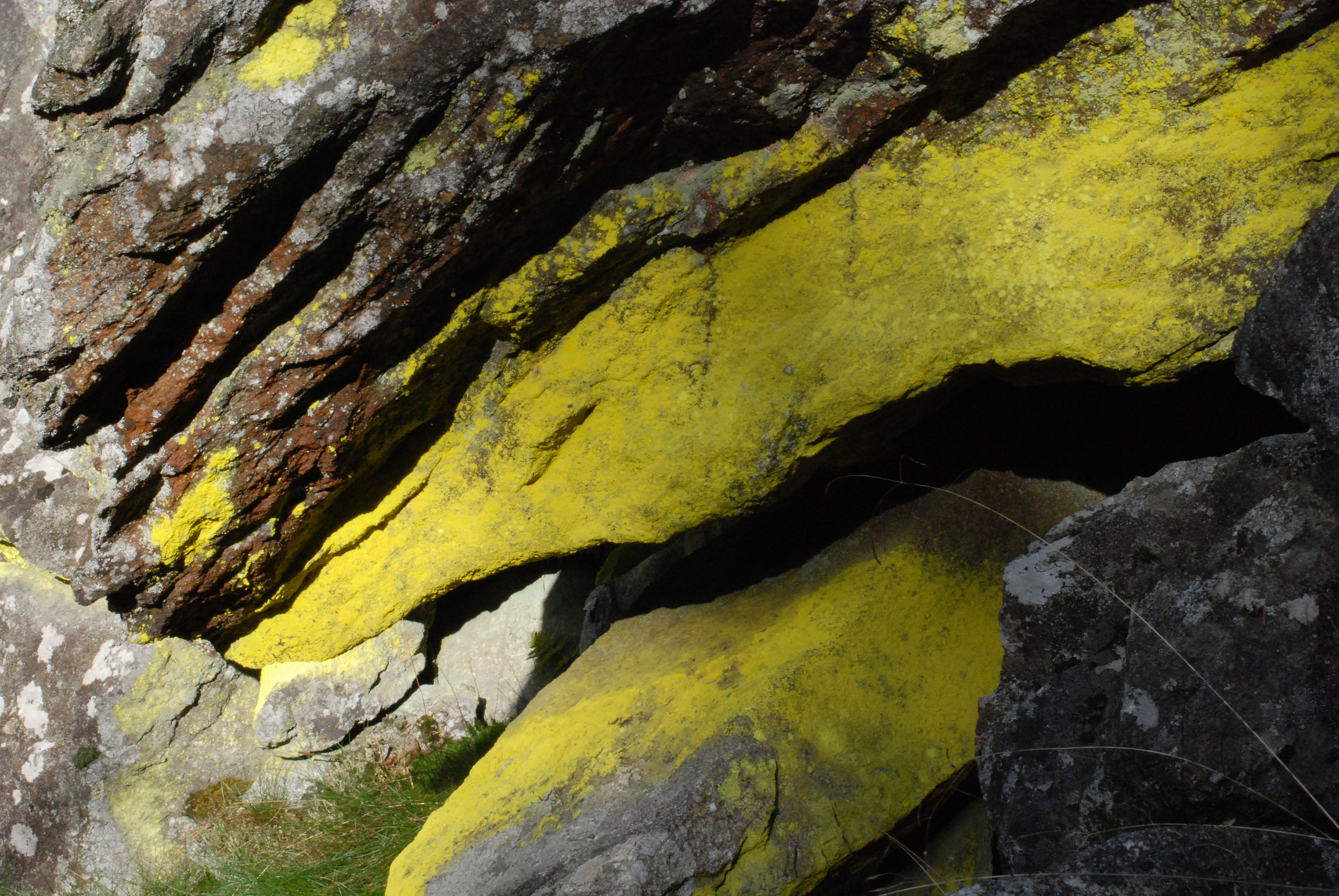

Scientific classification
- Kingdom: Fungi
- Division: Ascomycota
- Class: Arthoniomycetes
- Order: Arthoniales
- Family: Chrysotrichaceae
- Genus: Chrysothrix
- Species: C. chlorina

Binomial name
- Chrysothrix chlorina (Ach.) J.R.Laundon (1981)

Synonyms
- List: Lichen chlorinus Ach. (1799); Lepraria chlorina (Ach.) Ach. (1799); Pulveraria chlorina (Ach.) Ach. (1803); Lepra chlorina (Ach.) DC. (1805); Byssus chlorina (Ach.) Wahlenb. (1826); Alysphaeria chlorina (Ach.) Turpin (1827); Trachylia chlorina (Ach.) Rabenh. (1845); Calicium chlorinum (Ach.) Schaer. (1850); Cyphelium chlorinum (Ach.) Kremp. (1861); Coniocybe chlorina (Ach.) Rabenh. (1870); Crocynia chlorina (Ach.) Hue (1924); Caliciella corynella var. chlorina (Ach.) Räsänen (1939); Farinaria sparsa Sowerby (1803)

= Chrysothrix chlorina =

Species of lichen-forming fungus

Chrysothrix chlorina, the sulphur dust lichen, is a species of leprose (powdery) crustose lichen in the family Chrysotrichaceae. Originally described scientifically by the Swedish lichenologist Erik Acharius over 200 years ago, it has been shuffled to many different genera in its taxonomic history before finally being transferred to Chrysothrix in 1981. The lichen has a circumboreal distribution, meaning it occurs in northern boreal regions across the planet. It is typically saxicolous (rock-dwelling), particularly on the underside of rock overhangs, but has in rare instances been recorded growing on bark and various other surfaces.

The lichen thallus is a yellow to yellow-green layer of fungi and green algae that are bundled together in powdery clumps called soredia. It lacks apothecia and pycnidia, which are reproductive structures found in many other lichens. Chrysothrix chlorina resembles several other lichen species but can be differentiated based on chemical composition and morphological characteristics. Historical confusions and misidentifications have occurred, especially with species such as Chrysothrix candelaris and Psilolechia lucida. In India, Chrysothrix chlorina is used for dyeing, and 19th-century studies in Sweden revealed it could be used to produce 14 distinct colours.

== Taxonomic history ==
Originally described by Swedish lichenologist Erik Acharius in 1799, Chrysothrix chlorina was first named Lepraria chlorina. Acharius's Latin diagnosis (crustaceus pulverulentus sublanuginosus pulvinato conglomeratus mollis flavissimus) characterized the lichen as crusty, powdery, slightly woolly, cushioned, clustered, soft, and very yellow. The species epithet chlorina is derived from the Latin word chlorinus, meaning yellow-green.

In Lichenographia Britannica (1839), Dawson Turner and William Borrer praised the lichen, highlighting its elegant appearance. They likened it to a "beautifully" branched Conferva (a genus of algae) dusted with a fine yellow powder. They noted that when scraped from rocks, the yellow propagules remained stuck together in cushion-like masses, which floated on water and resisted submersion. The texture of the lichen, they said, was soft and easily marred by touch.

The species underwent numerous taxonomic shifts, having been proposed for or transferred to different genera throughout its history. It was finally transferred to the genus Chrysothrix by the British lichenologist Jack Laundon in his 1981 monograph. Laundon drew parallels between C. chlorina and C. candelaris based on their similar coarse, yellow thallus appearance. Unlike C. candelaris however, C. chlorina is distinct in its sterile condition, meaning it does not produce sexual reproductive structures such as apothecia. This absence of sexual features poses challenges in its classification, as these structures often provide critical characters used to distinguish between closely related lichen species.

In 1803, James Sowerby introduced Farinaria sparsa as a new species. This yellow fungus, found growing on the underside of the Lanyon Quoit, a dolmen in Cornwall, England, was illustrated in his work Coloured Figures of English Fungi or Mushrooms. In 1959, Elke Mackenzie highlighted Rolf Santesson's belief that this taxon likely referred to C. candelaris. By 2008, several taxa had been identified as synonymous with Chrysothrix chlorina. In 2013, the lichenologists Kerry Knudsen and Frank Bungartz expressed concerns regarding the consistent classification of C. candelaris, suggesting it remains a heterogenous species and is often misidentified, particularly in Europe and North America.

Vernacular names for Chrysothrix chlorina in North America include "sulphur dust lichen", "greenish gold dust", and "lime dust". In the United Kingdom, it has been called the "brimstone-coloured lepraria".

== Description ==
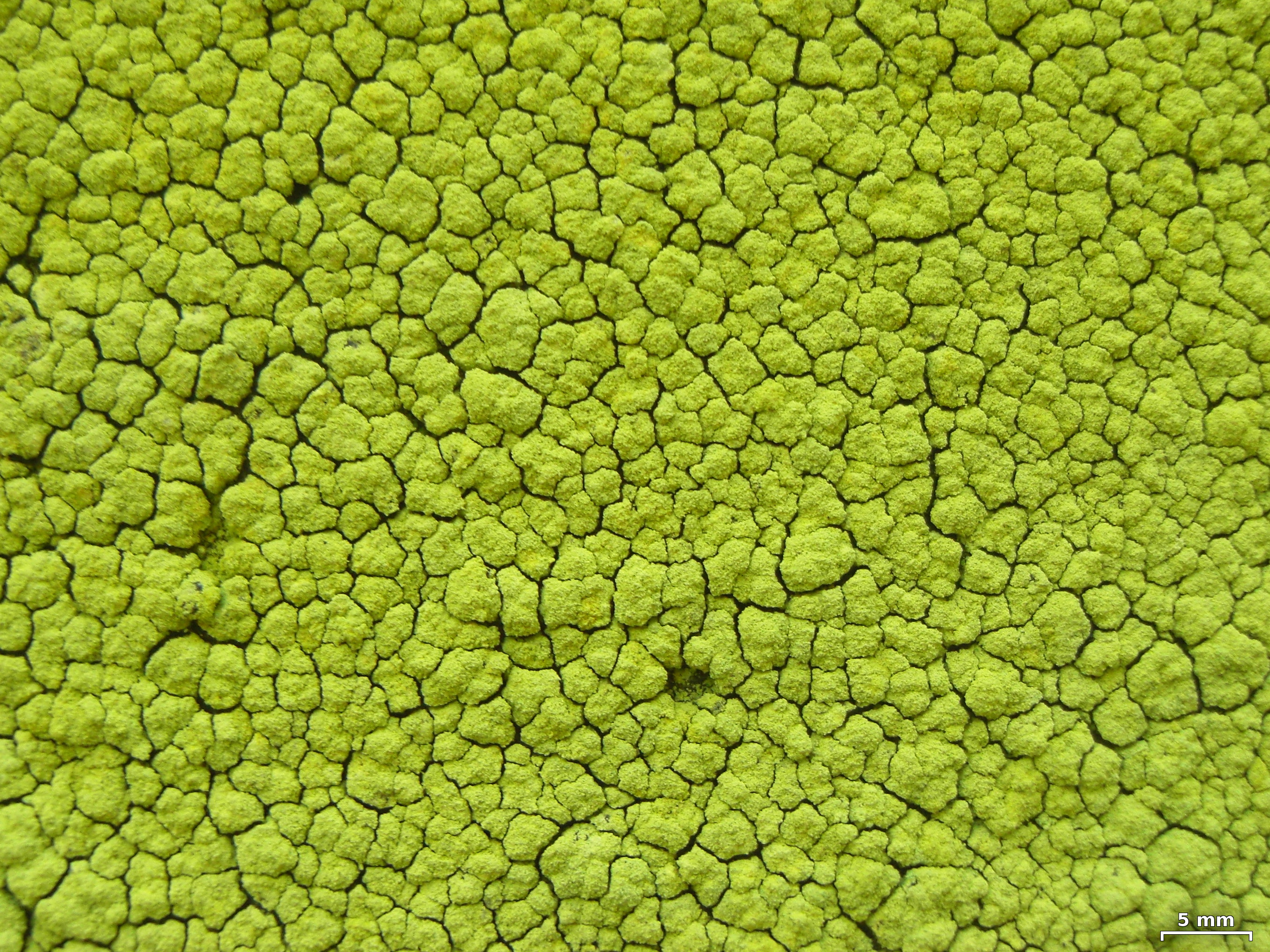
Closeup of an areolate surface texture; scale bar = 5 mm

Chrysothrix chlorina is characterised by its crustaceous and leprose (powdery) thallus. It typically forms a continuous thallus, ranging from non-areolate to strongly areolate, that is yellow to yellow-green in colour. This crust comprises pulverulent (powdery) granules with diameters between 0.1 and 0.2 mm, and can be up to about 1 mm thick. These granules, known as soredia (a type of reproductive propagule), consist of algal cells encased in fungal hyphae. The species does not have a thallus margin or a prothallus, and is devoid of apothecia (sexual reproductive structures) and pycnidia (asexual reproductive structures).

The symbiotic photobiont in Chrysothrix chlorina belongs to the genus Chlorella, which comprises single-celled green algae. These algal cells are up to 15 μm in diameter, while the fungal hyphae have a diameter of 2–4 μm.

=== Chemistry ===
Chrysothrix chlorina contains a suite of lichen products, including calycin, leprapinic acid, vulpinic acid, zeorin, and trace amounts of pulvinic acid and unidentified terpenoids. These chemical signatures help differentiate it from other similar sterile lichens that lack distinct features. Historically, Laundon identified these pigments using microcrystal tests, but contemporary analyses prefer more sensitive methods like thin-layer chromatography. Standard chemical spot tests on the thallus typically yield results of C−, K± (faint orange), KC± (red), Pd−, and UV+ (orange).

While Laundon's 1981 study suggested the lichen possessed a single chemotype containing calycin and vulpinic acid, subsequent research indicates greater chemical variability. For instance, Tor Tønsberg consistently identified pulvinic acid and zeorin in samples collected from both rock and bark. Moreover, lichen samples from Antarctica presented a unique chemotype, consisting solely of vulpinic acid—a composition not reported in other regions.

== Similar species ==
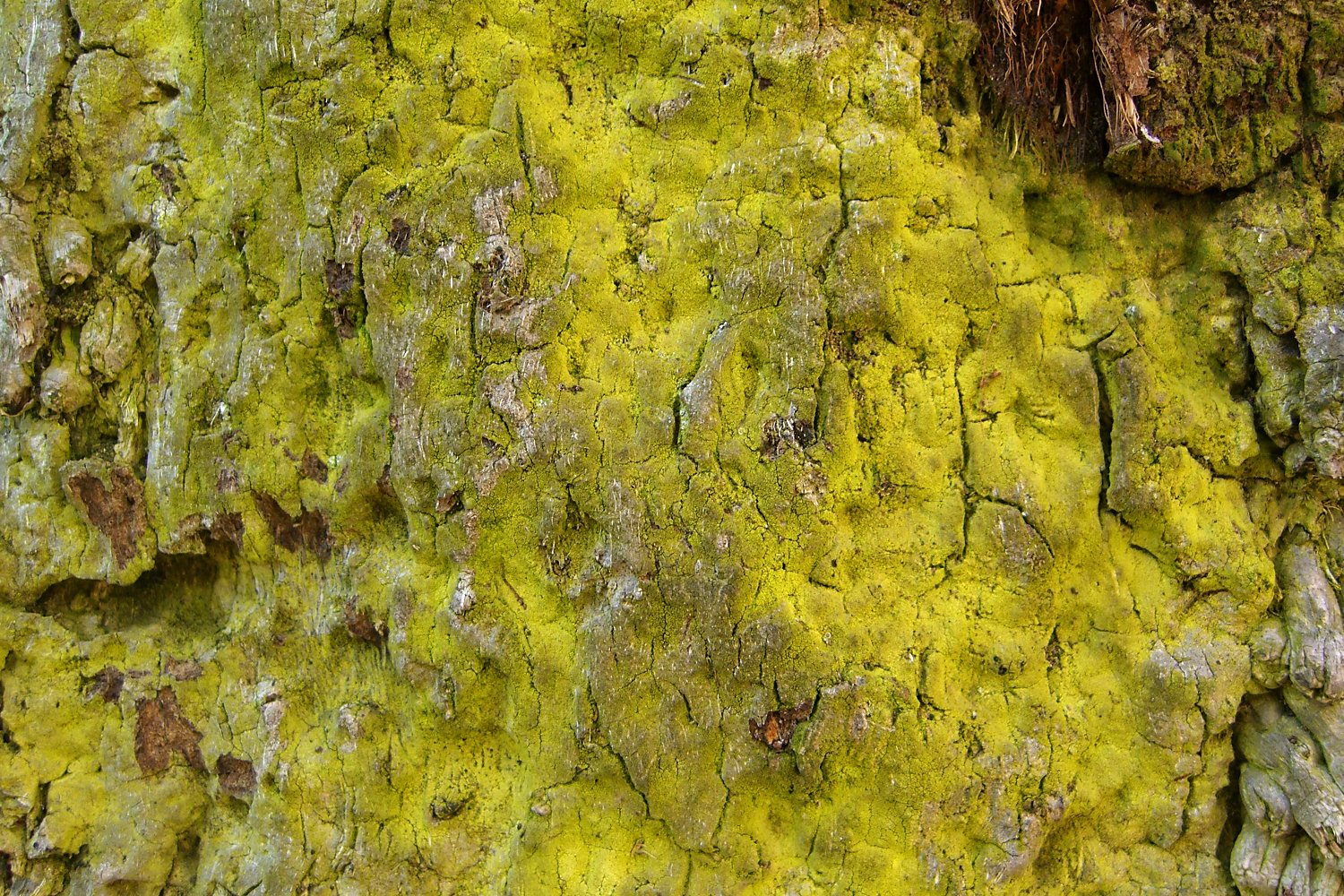
gold dust lichen, Chrysothrix candelaris

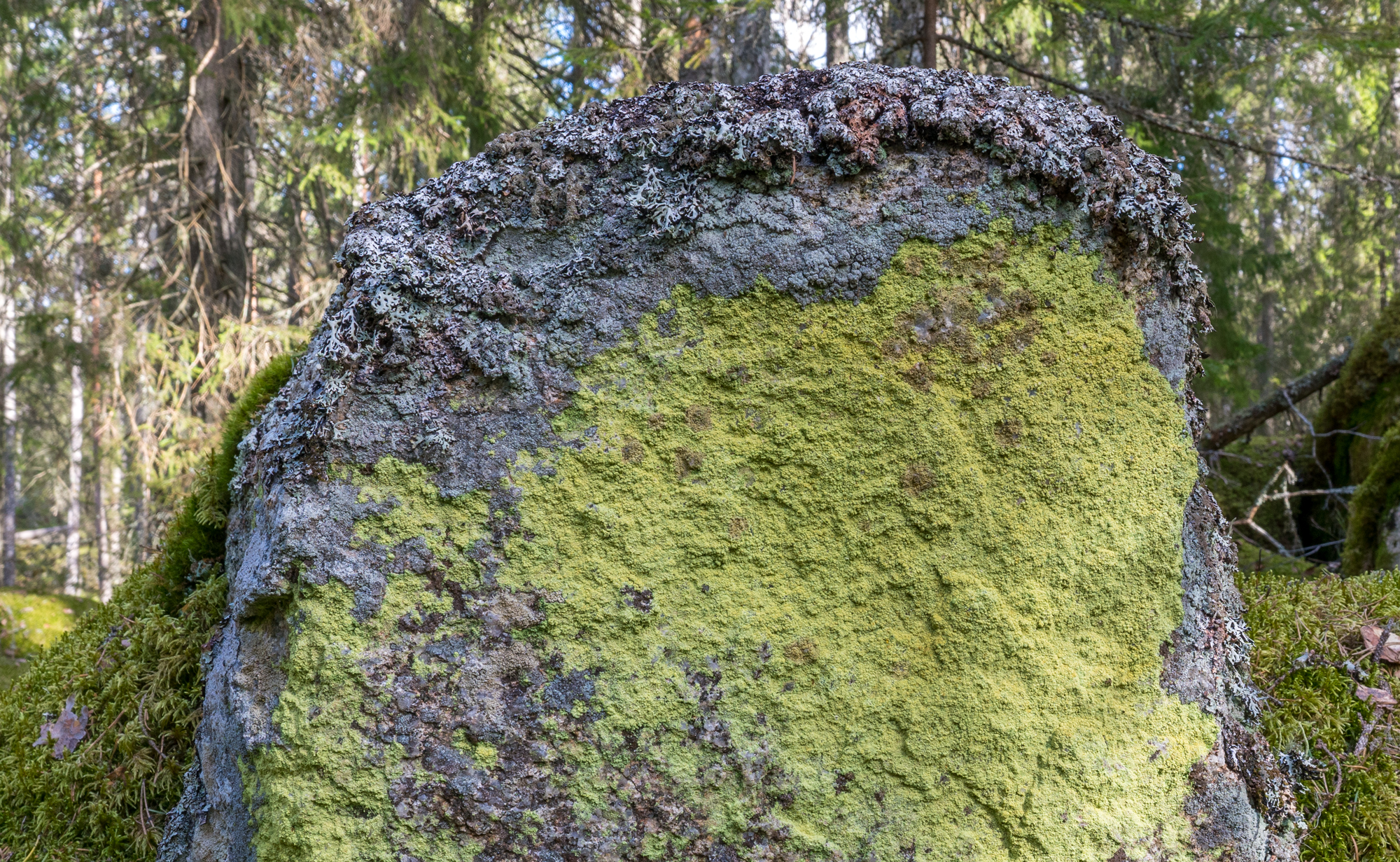
Psilolechia lucida

Chrysothrix chlorina closely resembles several species, including C. candelaris and sterile forms of Psilolechia lucida. Distinctions can be drawn from their chemical compositions and thallus features. For instance, C. chlorina consistently contains vulpinic acid, which is absent from C. candelaris. Meanwhile, Psilolechia lucida features a yellowish-green, powdery thallus that appears less vibrant than that of C. chlorina, attributed to the presence of rhizocarpic acid. Chemical tests are essential for accurately distinguishing challenging specimens.

Historically, some authors mistakenly identified Chrysothrix chlorina as the thallus of a Calicium species, resulting in the erroneous use of the name Calicium chlorinum. This confusion likely arose when specimens of Calicium chlorinum became overgrown by Chrysothrix chlorina, a situation also observed to occur with C. candelaris.

Chrysothrix chlorina is differentiated from a similar species, C. onokoensis, by its unique chemical profile, particularly the presence of calycin, vulpinic acid, and zeorin, while the latter may contain leprapinic acid. Morphologically, Chrysothrix chlorina tends to have densely packed granules that form a compact crust. This crust, especially in Eastern North American specimens, does not have a significant bicolouration in cross-section and often lacks a clear rhizohyphae layer. However, the crust's lower regions might appear slightly lighter in tone.

Another Eastern North American lookalike, Chrysothrix susquehannensis, differs chemically from C. chlorina in producing lecanoric acid together with rhizocarpic acid and epanorin as lichen products. Morphologically, it has a thinner crust, grows on different substrates, such as moss cushions and pockets of soil or organic matter on shaded vertical rock outcrops, and is only known to occur in Pennsylvania, USA.

== Habitat, distribution, and ecology ==
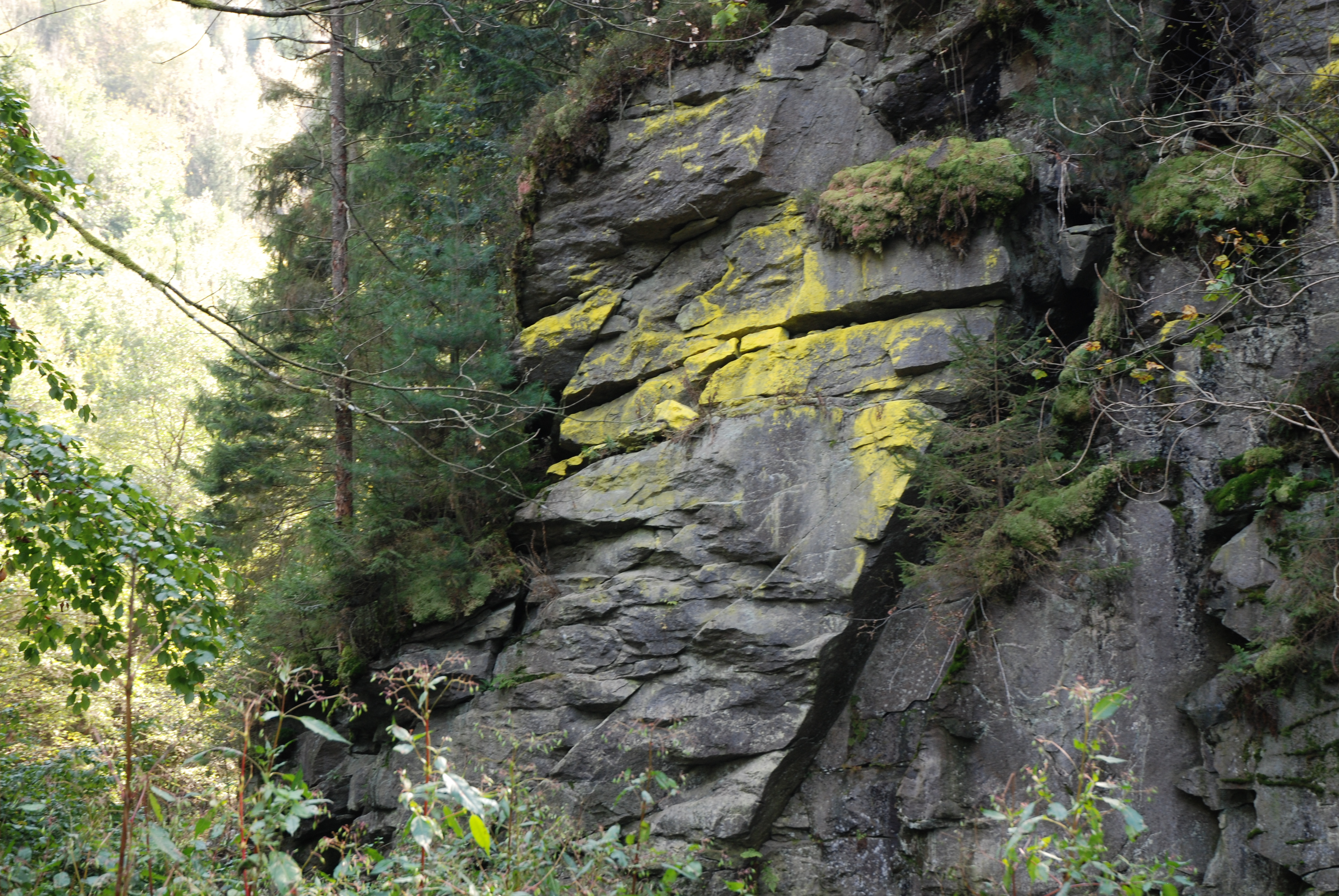
Rock overhangs are a typical habitat for C. chlorina.

Chrysothrix chlorina has a circumboreal distribution. It predominantly grows within the boreal forest zones of Europe, spanning from northern Italy to Scandinavia. Its presence is also noted in the Himalayas and North America, where it favours shaded, dry locales under rock overhangs and crevices. On occasion, it extends to mosses and other lichens. In eastern North America, it has a northerly distribution, with documented collections reaching as far north as Lake Nipigon, Ontario, and Vermont. Additional records indicate occurrences in Macaronesia, Antarctica, and the Russian Arctic. A specimen from the Tehri Garhwal district of Uttar Pradesh, India, was collected at an altitude of 3,350 m (10,990 ft). In Nepal, C. chlorina has been reported from 3,100 to 3,200 m elevation in a compilation of published records.

Chrysothrix chlorina prefers shaded environments and avoids areas with high nitrogen levels, such as near bird colonies. Its preference for shaded locations is more so than Lepraria incana, another prevalent dust lichen. Although C. chlorina infrequently grows on bark, it opts for the notably acidic trunks of conifers when it does. Instances of this lichen on man-made surfaces are rare. In Estonia, it is exclusive to ancient forests and is typically found on Norway spruce. Consequently, it is proposed as an indicator of prolonged forest continuity in coniferous settings. A study in the Suruli watershed of the Southern Western Ghats documented Chrysothrix chlorina on various substrates: bark, rock, wood, leaves, moss, and ground. The lichen primarily settles on rocks, especially within protected microenvironments of non-limestone talus and cliff regions. Such locales provide adequate illumination, sustain humidity, and offer protection against excessive moisture.

A novel four-segmented dsRNA virus was detected in Chrysothrix chlorina. This virus, named Chrysothrix chrysovirus 1 (CcCV1), is related to those found in the genus Alphachrysovirus, with some phylogenetic similarity to chrysoviruses that occur in filamentous ascomycetous fungi. It is one of the first mycoviruses identified from a lichen. Marchandiomyces corallinum is a lichenicolous (lichen-dwelling) fungus that has been reported to grow on C. chlorina.

Evidence suggests that pulvinic acid derivatives serve a protective role for the lichen, deterring specific herbivores and exhibiting antibacterial activity against gram-positive bacteria.

== Uses ==
In the state of Jammu and Kashmir, India, Chrysothrix chlorina is used as a dyeing agent. In the early 19th century, the Swedish physician and naturalist Johan Peter Westring (1753–1833) conducted research on the dyeing potential of various lichens, documenting his findings in 1805. Among the lichens he investigated was one referred to as Flock-laf, or "mustard powder lichen", then known scientifically as Pulveraria chlorina. Westring's experiments with this lichen yielded a spectrum of 14 distinct colours, ranging from pale yellow and spanning green, blue, red, brown, culminating in an almost black hue.
