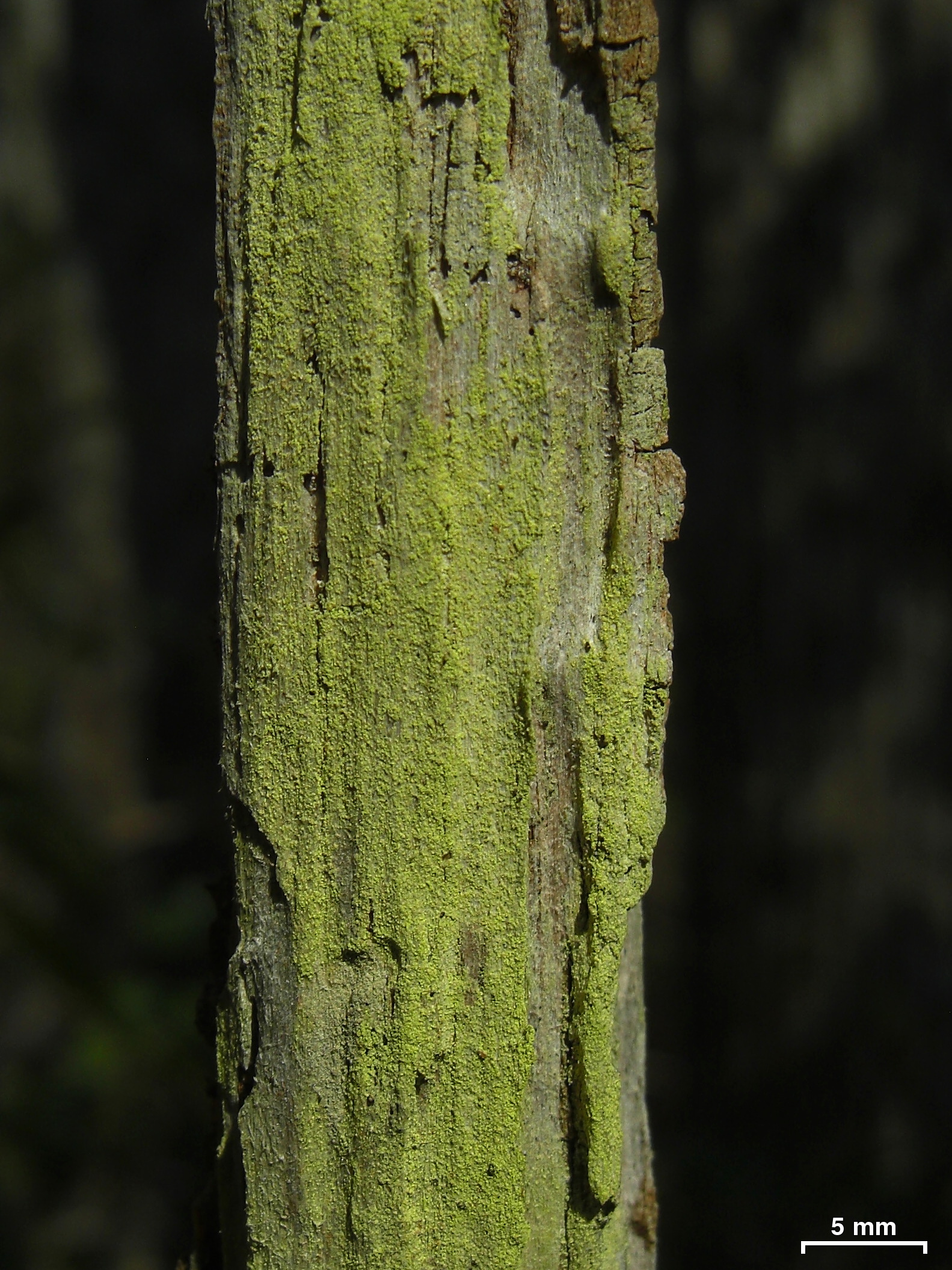
- on Cypress stump

Scientific classification
- Kingdom: Fungi
- Division: Ascomycota
- Class: Arthoniomycetes
- Order: Arthoniales
- Family: Chrysotrichaceae
- Genus: Chrysothrix
- Species: C. chamaecyparicola

Binomial name
- Chrysothrix chamaecyparicola Lendemer (2010)

= Chrysothrix chamaecyparicola =

Species of lichen

Chrysothrix chamaecyparicola is a species of corticolous (bark-dwelling), crustose lichen in the family Chrysotrichaceae. Found in the eastern United States, it was formally described as a new species in 2010 by lichenologist James Lendemer. Initially thought to be a North American population of the lookalike Chrysothrix flavovirens, it is now recognized as a separate species due to its distinguishing characteristics. It is particularly noted for its strong affinity for the bark of Atlantic white cedar trees and its dominance in conifer swamps across eastern North America.

== Taxonomy ==
The species was first described and identified by lichenologist James Lendemer in the Dismal Swamp State Park in Camden County, North Carolina, on December 10, 2009. Its affinity for the bark of the Atlantic white cedar, or Chamaecyparis thyoides, is reflected in its species epithet, chamaecyparicola. The type specimen, collected from a Chamaecyparis thyoides tree, is held at the New York Botanical Garden. An isotype was distributed in the ongoing exsiccata series titled "Lichens of Eastern North America".

Originally, this lichen was thought to belong to the species Chrysothrix flavovirens. However, the North American populations demonstrated notable chemical differences, particularly the lack of diffractaic acid, which set them apart from the European populations of C. flavovirens. This distinct difference, along with their geographic distribution, led Lendemer to define it as a distinct species.

== Description ==
The lichen Chrysothrix chamaecyparicola is distinguished by its crustose, leprose thallus – a thin layer that often forms on the bark of conifer trees. It manifests as an array of dull yellow or greenish-yellow granules that, over time, may fade to a whitish-yellow, particularly in preserved herbarium specimens. These granules, which can vary between spherical and irregular shapes, have a size range of approximately 15 to 30 μm across.

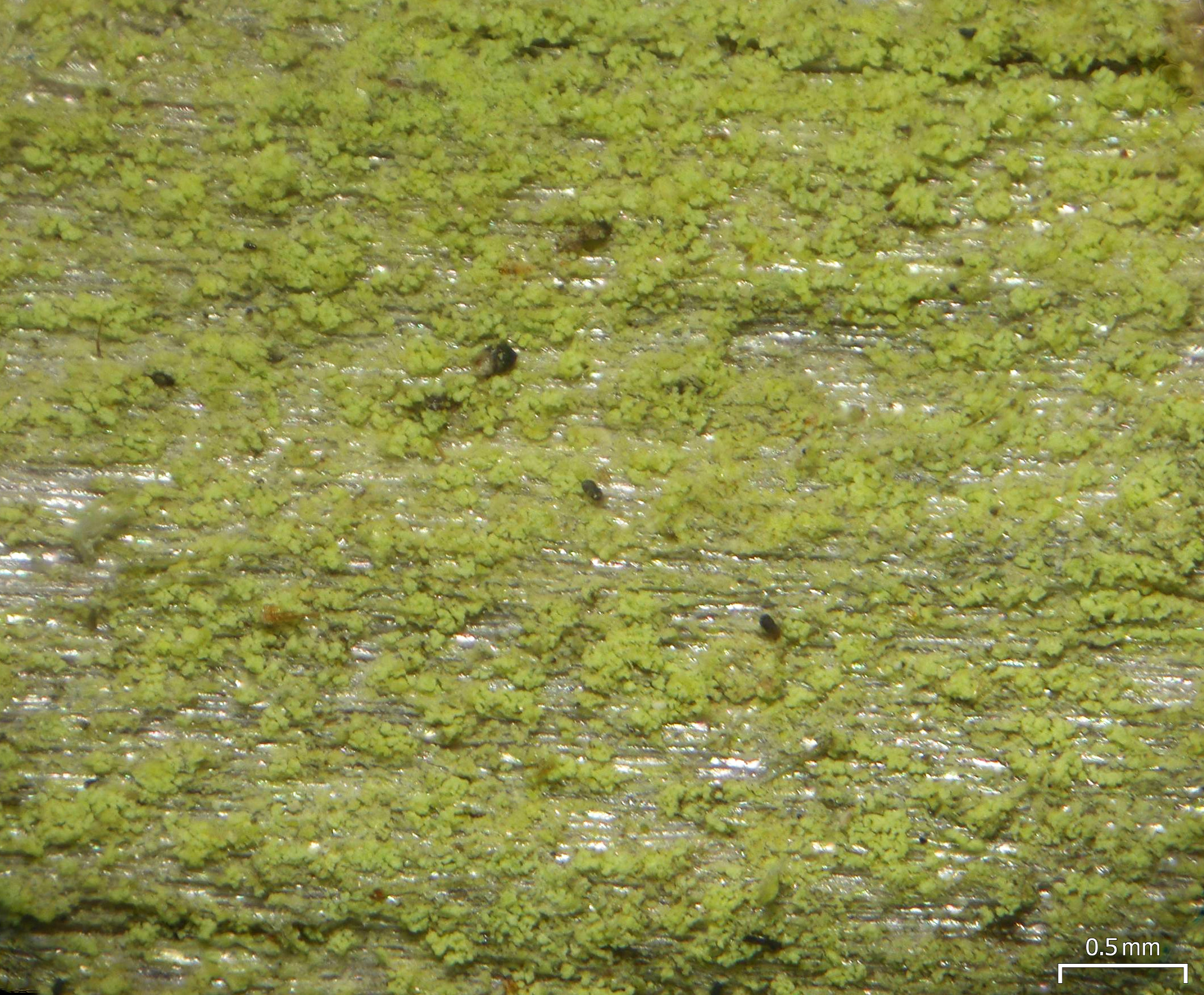
Closeup of thallus surface; scale bar = 0.5 mm

Unlike some other lichen species, Chrysothrix chamaecyparicola does not have rhizohyphae (root-like hyphae that can penetrate the substrate). Its granules are loosely connected, meaning they lack the fungal hyphae that usually link granules together in many lichen species. Instead, the granules coalesce to form either small, discontinuous patches or more extensive regions that are typically one to a few granules thick. The lichen is supports to a chlorococcoid photobiont, which are green algae that can reach up to 8.5 μm in diameter. Chrysothrix chamaecyparicola does not develop apothecia or pycnidia, which are reproductive structures commonly found in many lichen species. Its chemistry is noteworthy as well: despite testing negative in typical lichen spot tests, it exhibits a dull to bright orange glow when exposed to ultraviolet (UV) light due to the presence of rhizocarpic acid. Chrysothrix chamaecyparicola closely resembles Chrysothrix flavovirentis, but the absence of diffractaic acid sets it apart.

== Habitat and distribution ==
Chrysothrix chamaecyparicola is a conspicuous member of the lichen biota in conifer swamps across temperate and subtropical eastern North America. It is often the most conspicuous lichen, coating the trunks of trees in these high-humidity, low-light environments. While particularly evident in cedar swamps near the coast, it is also found on a diverse range of other conifers in inland swamps, including cypress, hemlock, and pine.

The species is most prevalent in the mid-Atlantic region of the United States, namely in New Jersey, Maryland, and Pennsylvania. This is also the core distribution area of its preferred host plant, Chamaecyparis thyoides. Chrysothrix chamaecyparicola has also been recorded in North Carolina.
