= Galbinothrix =

Scientific classification
- Domain: Eukaryota
- Kingdom: Fungi
- Division: Ascomycota
- Class: Arthoniomycetes
- Order: Arthoniales
- Family: Chrysotrichaceae
- Genus: Galbinothrix; Frisch, G.Thor, K.H.Moon & Y.Ohmura (2018)
- Species: G. caesiopruinosa

Binomial name
- Galbinothrix caesiopruinosa Frisch, G.Thor, K.H.Moon & Y.Ohmura (2018)

Species of lichen

Galbinothrix is a fungal genus in the family Chrysotrichaceae. It is monotypic, containing the single species Galbinothrix caesiopruinosa, a corticolous (bark-dwelling) lichen.

== Taxonomy ==
Both the genus and species were described as new to science in 2018 by Andreas Frisch, Göran Thor, Kwang Hee Moon, and Yoshihito Ohmura. The type specimen was collected in Chichibu Tama Kai National Park (Nagano Prefecture) at an elevation of 1,414 m (4,639 ft), where it was found growing on the smooth bark on an Alnus tree in a montane forest along the Shinano River. The genus name combines the Latin galbinus ("greenish-yellow") with the suffix thrix, which alludes to its relationship with the genus Chrysothrix; the species epithet refers to the ascomata, which are bluish grey ascomata and pruinose.

== Description ==
Galbinothrix caesiopruinosa has a thin, discontinuous thallus that ranges in color from pale to dark greyish-green to yellowish-olive; the thallus patches, which are partly endophloeodal, measure about 0.1–0.3 mm in diameter. The photobiont partner is chlorococcoid, with the algal layer between 40 and 80 μm thick, and individual algal cells measuring 5–19 by 4–17 μm. The ascomata are bluish-gray and pruinose; they have a reddish-brown proper exciple. Usnic acid and isousnic acid are lichen products found in the species; it does not contain pulvinic acid derivatives, which contrasts it with similar species in the Arthoniaceae, such as Chrysothrix caesia.

== Habitat and distribution ==
Galbinothrix caesiopruinosa occurs in Japan, including Hokkaido and central Honshu, and in the eastern mountain range of South Korea. Common and widespread in this region, it has been collected from shady and humid forests, as well as from planted trees along roadsides and in parking lots. Host trees include maple, alder, and ash.
