= Chrysothrix chilensis =

Scientific classification
- Kingdom: Fungi
- Division: Ascomycota
- Class: Arthoniomycetes
- Order: Arthoniales
- Family: Chrysotrichaceae
- Genus: Chrysothrix
- Species: C. chilensis

Binomial name
- Chrysothrix chilensis D.Liu & J.-S Hur (2018)
- Holotype: Cuesta Buenos Ayres, Chile

Species of lichen

Chrysothrix chilensis is a species of corticolous (bark-dwelling) crustose lichen belonging to the family Chrysotrichaceae.

== Taxonomy ==
Chrysothrix chilensis was formally described in 2018 by Dong Liu and Jae-Seoun Hur, based on specimens collected from Cuesta Buenos Ayres, Chile, in November 2013 by S.-O. Oh and Hur. The specific epithet chilensis refers to Chile, the country where this species was first discovered. This species closely resembles Chrysothrix granulosa but can be distinguished by its white hypothallus and the presence of the chemical compound chry 2.

== Description ==
The thallus of Chrysothrix chilensis is crustose, closely attached to its substrate, and ranges from effuse to slightly placodioid, covering areas 0.2–5 cm in diameter and up to 0.8 mm in thickness. The upper surface is granuliform, with granules measuring typically between 30 and 50 μm, and displays colours ranging from lemon yellow to bright yellow, occasionally with greenish tones. The margins of the thallus are generally indistinct.

The hypothallus, a layer beneath the thallus, is soft, loosely structured, byssoid, and typically white, occasionally marked by small yellow dots. The fungal hyphae are rough-textured, covered with numerous short yellow crystals, and measure 1–2.3 μm in width. The lichen's photobiont partner consists of round, chlorococcoid green algae cells measuring 6–19 μm in diameter. Apothecia (fruiting bodies) have not been observed.

Chemically, the lichen is characterized by negative reactions to most standard spot tests (K−, KC−, C−), and either negative or pale orange reaction to para-phenylenediamine (PD– or pale orange). It contains calycin and Chry 2 as major substances, and gyrophoric acid as a minor component. The substance chry 2 reacts distinctively under heat, displaying an orange centre with a dark orange margin and emitting an orange fluorescence under ultraviolet light.

== Habitat and distribution ==
Chrysothrix chilensis has been found exclusively in Chile, specifically in the region around Cuesta Buenos Ayres at elevations of about 257 m. It grows predominantly on bark, often in close association with other lichens such as species of Ramalina and Roccella. Its distribution frequently overlaps with that of the closely related species C. granulosa and occasionally with C. pavonii. However, C. chilensis can be differentiated by its unique hypothallus colouration and chemistry.
