= Chrysothrix pavonii =

Scientific classification
- Kingdom: Fungi
- Division: Ascomycota
- Class: Arthoniomycetes
- Order: Arthoniales
- Family: Chrysotrichaceae
- Genus: Chrysothrix
- Species: C. pavonii

Binomial name
- Chrysothrix pavonii (Dufour ex Fr.) J.R. Laundon

Species of lichen

Chrysothrix pavonii is a species of lichen-forming fungi in the family Chrysotrichaceae. It is endemic to Chile, and one of the four species in the genus that inhabit this country alongside Chrysothrix candelaris, Chrysothrix chilensis and Chrysothrix granulosa. Its habitat is near the coast and it always grows on the branches of spiny shrubs or on spines of cacti.

== Description ==
The thallus is fruticose-leprose to micro-fruticose, composed of fine hyaline to golden yellow filaments, forming irregular to globose clusters. Calycin is its characteristic secondary metabolite.
