= Chrysothrix occidentalis =

Scientific classification
- Kingdom: Fungi
- Division: Ascomycota
- Class: Arthoniomycetes
- Order: Arthoniales
- Family: Chrysotrichaceae
- Genus: Chrysothrix
- Species: C. occidentalis

Binomial name
- Chrysothrix occidentalis Elix & Kantvilas (2007)
- Type locality: Darling Plateau, Western Australia

Species of lichen

Chrysothrix occidentalis is a species of saxicolous (rock-dwelling) dust lichen in the family Teloschistaceae. This yellow lichen occurs in Western Australia in open Eucalyptus forests.

== Taxonomy ==
It was formally described as a new species in 2007 by Australian lichenologists John Alan Elix and Gintaras Kantvilas. The type specimen was collected from the Darling Plateau in the Brookton Highway Nature Reserve in Western Australia at an altitude of 285 m (935 ft), where, in Eucalyptus woodland, it was found growing on a sheltered laterite ledge. The species name, occidentalis, means "west", and refers to the lichen's distribution in Western Australia.

== Description ==
Chrysothrix occidentalis has a powdery, crust-like appearance that ranges in colour from bright yellow to yellow-green or yellow-orange. It does not have a protective outer layer (cortex and its structure is simple, adhering directly to its substrate. The lichen forms small, somewhat round colonies about 0.5–1 cm wide, which can merge over time to form larger irregular patches up to 10 cm wide. These colonies consist of tiny granular structures called soredia, which are fine and round in shape, measuring between 20–80 μm in width. The photosynthetic partner in this lichen, or photobiont, is a type of green algae, which is spherical and roughly 15–18 μm wide. The hyphae comprising the internal network of fungal threads are 1.6–3 μm thick. No supporting base layer, known as the hypothallus, is visible, and reproductive structures like apothecia and pycnidia have not been observed. Chemically, when tested, the lichen turns orange upon exposure to a solution of potassium hydroxide (K+). Its primary lichen products include leprapinic acid, with smaller amounts of calycin, vulpinic acid, and pulvinic dilactone.

== Habitat and distribution ==
Chrysothrix occidentalis is found in various places in the southwestern region of Western Australia. It typically grows on protected granite or laterite ledges within open Eucalyptus forests, ranging in altitudes between 100 and 650 m (330 and 2,130 ft). Some lichens species frequently found alongside Chrysothrix occidentalis include Buellia substellulans, Lecanora farinacea, Ramboldia petraeoides, Xanthoparmelia antleriformis, and X. tasmanica.
