= Chrysothrix septemseptata =

Scientific classification
- Domain: Eukaryota
- Kingdom: Fungi
- Division: Ascomycota
- Class: Arthoniomycetes
- Order: Arthoniales
- Family: Chrysotrichaceae
- Genus: Chrysothrix
- Species: C. septemseptata

Binomial name
- Chrysothrix septemseptata Jagad.Ram, Lumbsch, Lücking & G.P.Sinha (2006)

Species of lichen

Chrysothrix septemseptata is a species of crustose lichen in the family Arthoniaceae. Found in India, it was formally described as a new species in 2006 by T.A.M. Jagadeesh Ram, H. Thorsten Lumbsch, Robert Lücking, and G.P. Sinha. The type specimen was collected in the Sundarbans Biosphere Reserve (West Bengal); here it was found growing on the bark of the mangrove tree Tamarix gallica. The lichen grows as a thin lemon-yellow crust measuring 0.5–2 cm (0.2–0.8 in) in diameter, with isolated patches sometimes coalescing. It contains vulpinic acid as a major secondary chemical, and minor amounts of calycin. Chrysothrix septemseptata is only known to occur at the type locality. Other mangrove trees that it is found on include Brugruiera gymnorhiza, Heritiera fomes, and Sonneratia apetala, as well as the non-mangrove tree Casuarina equisetifolia. The specific epithet septemseptata refers to the seven septa that are characteristic of the ascospores of this lichen.
