= Snippocia =

Scientific classification
- Domain: Eukaryota
- Kingdom: Fungi
- Division: Ascomycota
- Class: Arthoniomycetes
- Order: Arthoniales
- Family: Arthoniaceae
- Genus: Snippocia; Ertz, Kukwa & N.Sand. (2018)
- Species: S. nivea

Binomial name
- Snippocia nivea (D.Hawksw. & P.James) Ertz & Sanderson (2018)

Synonyms
- Schismatomma niveum D.Hawksw. & P.James (1971)

Single-species fungal genus

Snippocia is a monospecific fungal genus in the family Arthoniaceae. It contains the single species Snippocia nivea, a crustose, corticolous (bark-dwelling) lichen. This lichen was previously known as Schismatomma niveum; Snippocia was established to accommodate the species after molecular studies indicated that it did not belong in its previously assigned genus.

== Taxonomy ==
Snippocia nivea was first described as Schismatomma niveum by the lichenologists David L. Hawksworth and Peter James in 1971. The species was initially classified in the family Roccellaceae, but subsequent molecular research revealed that it belonged in the Arthoniaceae. Due to the taxonomic complexity within the genus Arthonia and the need to avoid confusion with the existing species Arthonia nivea, the species was reclassified and placed into the newly proposed genus Snippocia by Damien Ertz and Neil Sanderson in 2020. The authors considered placing the species within the genus Leprantha, as both share similar chemistry in producing psoromic acid. However, molecular analysis of Leprantha cinereopruinosa (the type species of Leprantha) showed it to be unrelated to Snippocia nivea, instead grouping with Arthonia ilicina. The genus name Snippocia was derived by reversing the surname of Brian Coppins (Snippoc), in honour of his contributions to the field of lichenology.

== Description ==
Genus Snippocia is characterised by its unusual features within the family, including its distinct phylogenetic position and its sterile, sorediate thallus. The thallus is crustose (crust-like) and persistently sterile, meaning it does not produce fruiting bodies for sexual reproduction. Instead, it reproduces asexually through soredia, which are small clusters of fungal hyphae and algal cells that can break off and form new lichens.

A key identifying feature of Snippocia is its bright white colour, which is reflected in the species epithet nivea, meaning "snow-white" in Latin. This white appearance is due to the presence of soredia on the thallus surface.

Chemically, Snippocia is distinguished by its production of psoromic acid and 2-O-demethylpsoromic acid. These lichen products can be detected through chemical spot tests and thin-layer chromatography, techniques commonly used in lichen identification.

== Habitat and distribution ==
Snippocia nivea is found in temperate forest regions, primarily in Western Europe. It has been recorded in Brittany, France, and the New Forest in England. This lichen grows on the bark of old oak (Quercus robur) and beech (Fagus) trees, typically in areas with acidic bark.
