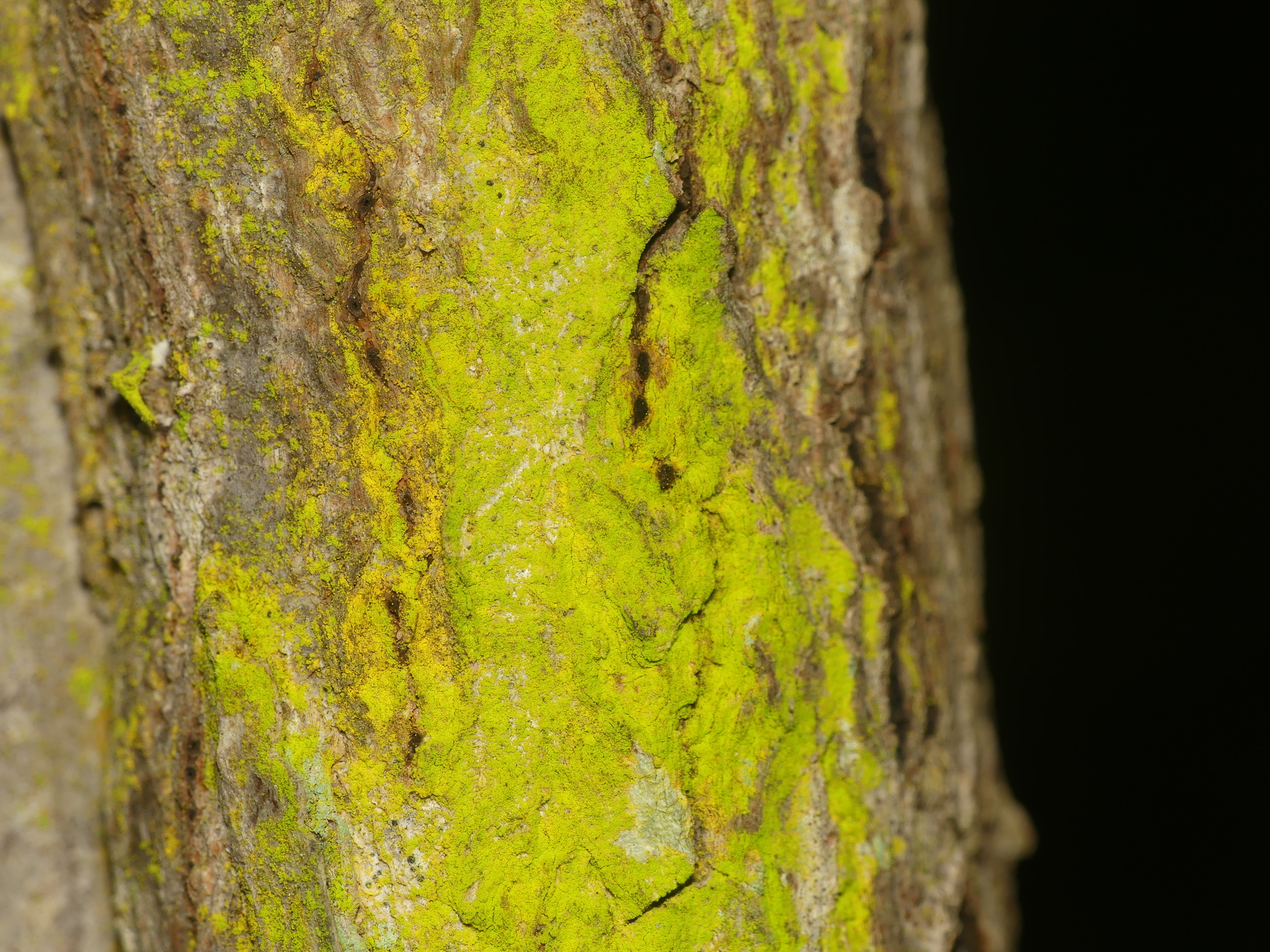

Scientific classification
- Kingdom: Fungi
- Division: Ascomycota
- Class: Arthoniomycetes
- Order: Arthoniales
- Family: Chrysotrichaceae
- Genus: Chrysothrix
- Species: C. xanthina

Binomial name
- Chrysothrix xanthina (Vain.) Kalb (2001)

Synonyms
- Lepraria xanthina Vain. (1901)

= Chrysothrix xanthina =

Species of lichen

Chrysothrix xanthina is a widely distributed species of leprose lichen in the family Chrysotrichaceae. It has a bright yellow to bright greenish-yellow, thin, granular thallus, and typically grows on bark, although it is infrequently found growing on rock.

== Taxonomy ==
It was first scientifically described by Finnish lichenologist Edvard August Vainio in 1901 as Lepraria xanthina. Klaus Kalb transferred it to the genus Chrysothrix in 2001. Kalb resurrected the species from synonymy with the lookalike Chrysothrix candelaris by virtue of its smaller granules and differences in chemistry: C. candelaris produces calycin, while C. xanthina makes pinastric acid. The granules made by C. xanthina are typically in the range 25–40 μm, while those of C. candelaris are 50–75 μm.

Jack Laundon did not agree with the decision to promote this to a distinct species, noting "the absence of significant morphological characters, although small differences in soredial size were alleged". He further went on to note that the earliest name for the chemomorph, Lepra citrina Schaer. (1823) should have priority, "if the species is split on chemical grounds, a procedure, however, of doubtful merit".

== Habitat and distribution ==
Kalb originally considered Chrysothrix xanthina to be a tropical/subtropical species, although it is now known to have a wider range. It has been recorded from Africa (including Madagascar), Asia, Macaronesia, New South Wales, North America, and South America. Chrysothrix xanthina is widespread in eastern North America, where its range extends west to the eastern edge of the mixed grass prairie ecotone found in the Great Plains. It grows on both coniferous and hardwood trees. Rarely, it has been recorded growing on sheltered, somewhat shaded sandstone. In 2007, it was reported for the first time from Tasmania, Norfolk Island, and New Zealand.
