= Pyrenula plicata =

Scientific classification
- Kingdom: Fungi
- Division: Ascomycota
- Class: Eurotiomycetes
- Order: Pyrenulales
- Family: Pyrenulaceae
- Genus: Pyrenula
- Species: P. plicata

Binomial name
- Pyrenula plicata Aptroot & Sipman (2013)
- Holotype: Bosque de Fray Jorge National Park, Chile

Species of lichen-forming fungus

Pyrenula plicata is a species of corticolous (bark-dwelling) crustose lichen in the family Pyrenulaceae. The species forms striking bright orange crusts on dead woody twigs and produces exceptionally large ascospores that develop distinctive longitudinal folds as they mature, giving them a wrinkled appearance. It is known only from the coastal fog zone of the central Chilean desert near sea level, where it grows on scattered shrubs as part of a specialized lichen community adapted to fog-influenced conditions.

== Taxonomy ==
This species was described as new by Harrie Sipman and André Aptroot in 2013. The holotype originates from the Bosque de Fray Jorge National Park (Alto de Talinay, Caleta Ramadita) in Coquimbo Region, Chile, collected on dead branchlets. The species epithet plicata refers to the plicate (having parallel folds) nature of mature spores.

== Description ==
This striking species forms bright orange crusts on dead branchlets. The thallus may be several centimeters across and is about 150 μm thick. It is smooth, orange when exposed to full light and pale brownish in shade, and is often marked by tiny white spots where the surface layer breaks (pseudocyphellae). A thin black line may surround individual patches. The thallus is mostly within the bark but is covered by a compact outer layer about 10 μm thick. Just beneath this layer lies a band of tiny yellow crystals, and scattered larger crystal aggregates can be seen under polarized light. The green algal partner consists of cells 4 μm wide by 4–8 μm long. The perithecia are immersed in the thallus and nearly spherical, about 0.5 mm in diameter (ranging from 0.3 to 0.8 mm). Their walls are uniformly carbonized and about 50 μm thick. Each has a black pore at the top. The hamathecium is clear; the filaments are 1.0–1.5 μm wide and unbranched between the asci but branch and interconnect above. The asci are large, around 200 μm long and 40 μm wide, and have a small ocular chamber. Each ascus contains eight ascospores arranged in two rows. The spores have three cross‑walls (septa) and are very large, measuring 55–63 μm long and 19–22 μm wide. They are pale gray‑brown, with lens‑shaped internal cavities (lumina) and a thick inner wall at the tips. As the spores mature the outer wall develops about twenty longitudinal folds, giving them a wrinkled appearance. No asexual structures are present. The bright color results from parietin, an orange anthraquinone pigment.

== Habitat and distribution ==
As of its original publication, Pyrenula plicata was known to occur only in its type locality in the coastal fog zone of the central Chilean desert. It occurs near sea level on the woody remains and bark of dead twigs, on scattered shrubs on the seaward side of a coastal mountain range, where it grows with other lichens such as Diploicia canescens, Chrysothrix pavonii, and species of Caloplaca and Rinodina. It appears to form part of the highly specialised lichen funga characteristic of this fog-influenced habitat, which includes many members of the family Roccellaceae. No additional locations were reported by Aptroot in his 2021 world key to the genus.

== See also ==
- List of Pyrenula species
