= Chrysothrix tchupalensis =

Scientific classification
- Kingdom: Fungi
- Division: Ascomycota
- Class: Arthoniomycetes
- Order: Arthoniales
- Family: Chrysotrichaceae
- Genus: Chrysothrix
- Species: C. tchupalensis

Binomial name
- Chrysothrix tchupalensis Elix & Kantvilas (2006)
- Holotype site: Tchupala Falls, Queensland

Species of lichen

Chrysothrix tchupalensis is a little-known species of saxicolous (rock-dwelling), powdery lichen in the family Chrysotrichaceae. It occurs in north Queensland, Australia. The lichen forms a powdery, bright yellow thallus that grows on sheltered, humid rocks in a tropical rainforest environment.

== Taxonomy ==
Chrysothrix tchupalensis was formally described as a new species in 2006 by the lichenologists John Alan Elix and Gintaras Kantvilas. The type specimen was collected in Wooroonooran National Park, Tchupala Falls, Queensland, Australia. The specific epithet tchupalensis refers to the type locality.

== Description ==
This lichen has a crustose and leprose (powdery), bright lemon yellow thallus. Chrysothrix tchupalensis is very loosely adnate, and forms small, irregularly roundish, convex cushions 0.5–1 cm wide, eventually coalescing into patches up to 5 cm (2 in) wide. The soredia are granular, with individual granules measuring 60–160 μm wide. Its photobiont is chlorococcoid, spherical, and measures 10–18 μm wide. The hypothallus is pale grey-white to black. Apothecia and pycnidia have not been observed to occur in this species.

On standard chemical spot tests, the thallus of Chrysothrix tchupalensis tests K−, C−, KC−, and PD−. It contains leprapinic acid as a major secondary metabolite (lichen product) and 4,5-dichlorolichexanthone as a minor component.

Chrysothrix tchupalensis is similar to Chrysothrix granularis but is distinguished by its thallus being loosely adnate, having larger granules, and containing leprapinic acid.

== Habitat and distribution ==
At the time of its original publication, Chrysothrix tchupalensis was known only from its type locality in north Queensland, Australia. It grows on sheltered, humid rocks in tropical rainforest environments. It co-occurs with Porina crassa and Sagenidiopsis subconfluentica.
