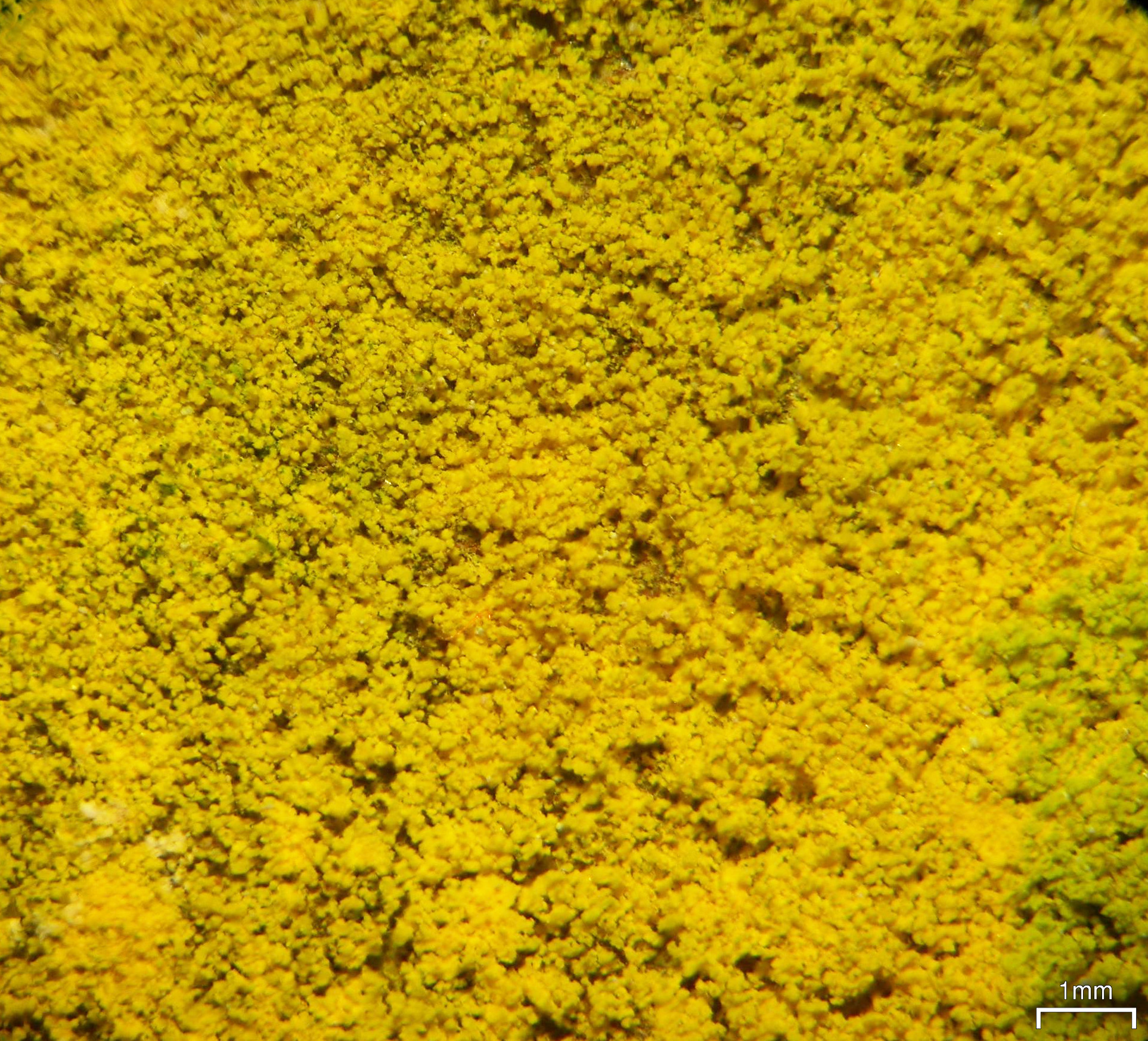

Scientific classification
- Kingdom: Fungi
- Division: Ascomycota
- Class: Arthoniomycetes
- Order: Arthoniales
- Family: Chrysotrichaceae
- Genus: Chrysothrix
- Species: C. onokoensis

Binomial name
- Chrysothrix onokoensis (Wolle) R.C.Harris & Ladd (2008)

Synonyms
- Bulbotrichia onokoensis Wolle (1877)

= Chrysothrix onokoensis =

Species of lichen

Chrysothrix onokoensis is a species of crustose lichen in the family Chrysotrichaceae. Originally described as an alga by Francis Wolle in 1877, it was recognized as a lichen by Asa Gray shortly after, but not formally reclassified until 2008. This distinctive bright yellow to yellow-green lichen forms loosely attached, irregularly spreading patches on rock surfaces, primarily shaded sandstone. It has a somewhat disjunct distribution in the eastern United States, with most collections coming from the Ozark–St. Francis National Forest in Arkansas, though its type locality is in Glen Onoko, Pennsylvania. The species lacks known reproductive structures and is characterized by its two-layered structure consisting of yellow granules above and rhizohyphae below.

== Taxonomy ==
It was described as a new species in 1877 by Francis Wolle, who initially classified it as a member of the genus Bulbotrichia. In its original description, Wolle documented the species as forming small, bright pea-green cushions ranging from ¼ inch to 1 inch in diameter, growing on partially shaded rocks in Glen Onoko, Pennsylvania. The species epithet refers to this type locality. The type specimen was represented in Gottlob Ludwig Rabenhorst's Algen Europa's, Decade 243, No. 2428. Despite being initially described as an alga, the renowned botanist Asa Gray promptly recognized it as a lichen in 1878, politely noting in a letter to the editor of the Torrey Botanical Club Bulletin that "Bulbotrichia onokoensis is founded on the young thallus of a Lichen". However, this taxonomic correction remained largely overlooked for 128 years until James Lendemer, while cataloging algal specimens at the Academy of Natural Sciences of Philadelphia, identified it as belonging to the genus Chrysothrix. The species was formally transferred to this genus in 2008 by Richard C. Harris and Douglas Ladd, who established the new combination Chrysothrix onokoensis.

The species has occasionally been misidentified as Chaenotheca furfuracea or Chrysothrix chlorina, but differs from both in its structure and chemical composition.

== Description ==
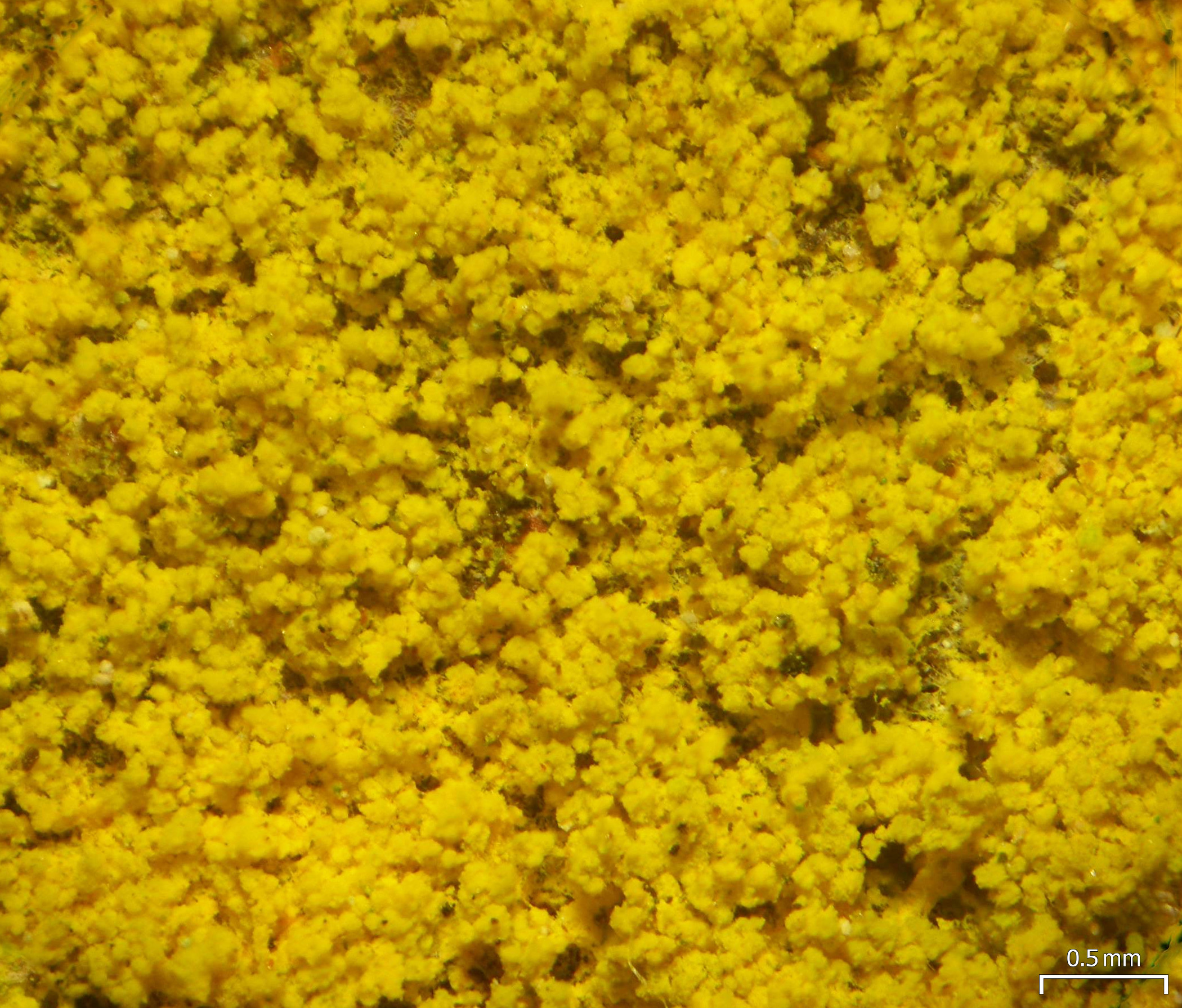
Closeup of thallus granules; scale bar = 0.5 mm

Chrysothrix onokoensis forms a crustose (crust-like), leprose-byssoid thallus that appears as a thick, bright yellow to bright yellow-green growth on rock surfaces. The thallus lacks a protective outer layer (ecorticate) and is loosely attached to the substrate, making it easy to separate from the rock. It does not form well-defined lobes but instead creates extensive, irregularly spreading patches up to 10 cm (4 in) wide and about 1 mm thick.

The lichen's structure consists of two distinct layers: an upper layer of yellow granules and a lower layer of whitish to brownish rhizohyphae (fungal filaments that attach to the substrate) up to 0.6 mm thick. These rhizohyphae are initially colorless but become brown with age, measuring 3.5–6.5 μm in thickness. The photobiont (the algal partner in the lichen symbiosis) is a chlorococcoid green alga that is spherical in shape and measures between 7–20 μm in diameter, most commonly 10–15 μm.

The granules that make up the upper layer are variable in shape, either spherical or somewhat irregular, measuring 20–80 μm across, and usually have projecting fungal filaments (hyphae). These hyphae are colorless, 2.5–4.5 μm thick, and possess a rough, colorless sheath up to 1.0 μm thick. No reproductive structures such as apothecia (fruiting bodies) or pycnidia have been observed in this species. Chemical tests (spot tests) on the lichen produce negative results, though it may show a dull orange reaction under ultraviolet light. The primary secondary metabolite present appears to be leprapinic acid, though further studies are needed to confirm this.

A lookalike rock-dwelling species with a similar distribution is Chrysothrix susquehannensis. It can be distinguished chemically from C. onokoensis by its C+ (red/pink) reaction. Further, it tends to grow on organic matter that has accumulated on rocks, rather than directly on the rocks.

== Habitat and distribution ==
Chrysothrix onokoensis primarily grows on shaded sandstone rocks, with one documented exception from Alabama where it was found on limestone. It thrives in sheltered environments beneath large, damp acidic rock formations. The species has a somewhat disjunct distribution pattern, with most collections coming from the southeastern United States, particularly Arkansas, where it has been found in multiple locations within the Ozark – St. Francis National Forest, including the Boston Mountains, White Rock Wildlife Management Area, Alum Cove recreation area, and Blanchard Springs recreation area.

Other documented locations include Buck's Pocket State Park in Alabama and Broxton Rocks ecological preserve in Georgia. The type locality in Glen Onoko, Carbon County, Pennsylvania appears somewhat isolated from the main distribution range of the species. However, this area is known to harbor rare plants that are disjunct from more southern regions, including species typically found in the Ozarks.

Unlike the similar species Chrysothrix chlorina, which has a different distribution pattern, C. onokoensis seems to prefer the specific environmental conditions found in these scattered, protected rocky habitats of the eastern United States.
