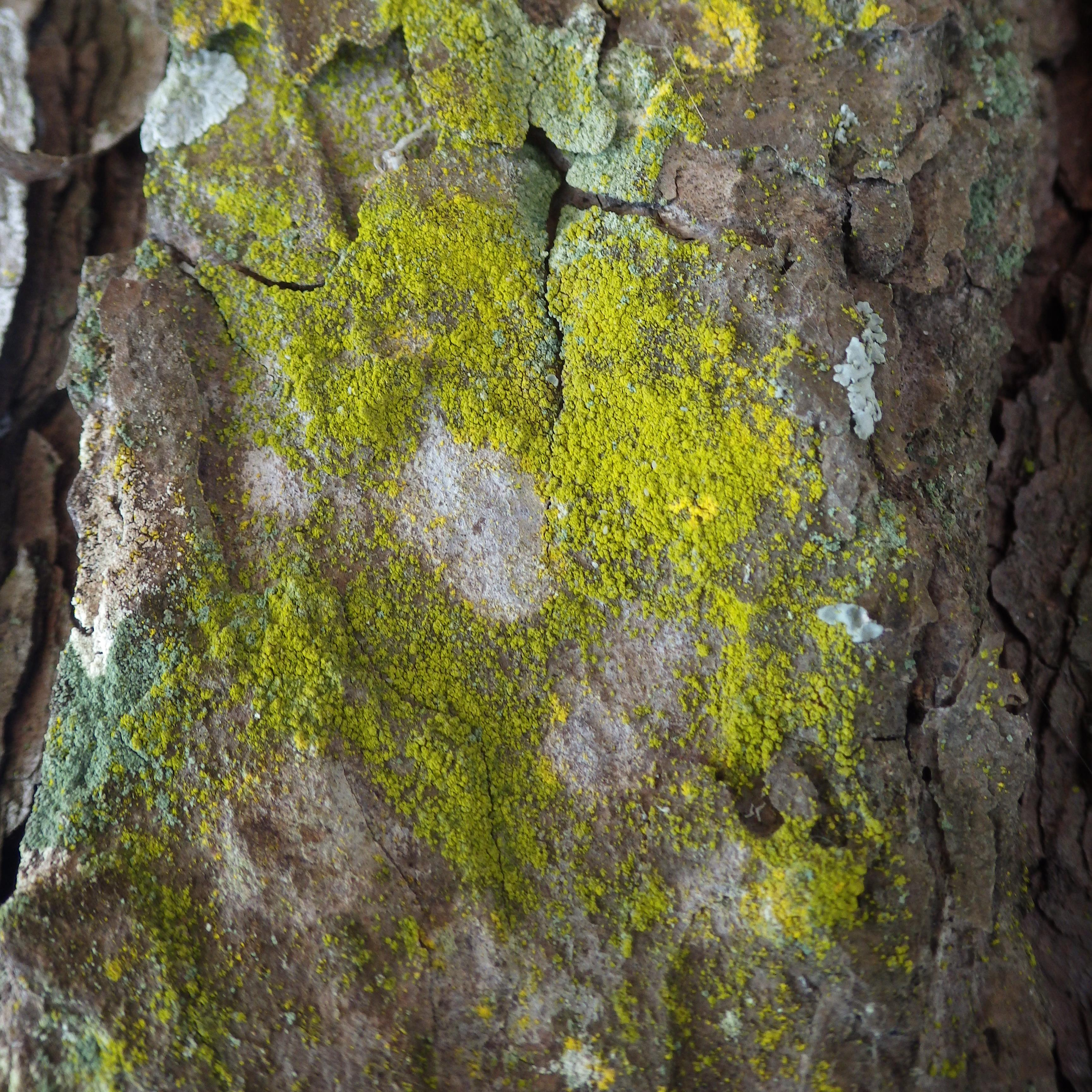
- On bark in Portugal

Scientific classification
- Domain: Eukaryota
- Kingdom: Fungi
- Division: Ascomycota
- Class: Arthoniomycetes
- Order: Arthoniales
- Family: Chrysotrichaceae
- Genus: Chrysothrix
- Species: C. flavovirens

Binomial name
- Chrysothrix flavovirens Tønsberg (1994)

= Chrysothrix flavovirens =

Species of lichen

Chrysothrix flavovirens is a species of crustose and corticolous (bark-dwelling) lichen in the family Chrysotrichaceae. It has a pale greenish-yellow thallus that contains rhizocarpic acid. This lichen forms powdery, granular crusts that spread extensively over tree bark and rarely produces fruiting bodies, instead reproducing mainly through tiny dust-like particles (soredia). Originally described from Norway in 1994, it is now known to be widespread across Europe and has also been found in Japan and North America, where it fluoresces orange under ultraviolet light due to its distinctive chemical composition.

== Taxonomy ==
The lichen was formally described as a new species in 1994 by Tor Tønsberg as the sorediate counterpart of the common and widespread Chrysothrix candelaris. The type specimen was collected from Kirkeøy, Norway, where it was found growing on Picea abies.

== Description ==
Chrysothrix flavovirens forms a superficial, powdery crust (thallus) that spreads over the substrate in continuous, often extensive patches. The surface is composed of minute, more-or-less evenly sized soredia—loose granules that contain both fungal and algal partners—measuring roughly 20–25 μm in diameter. When the granules are densely packed the thallus can become relatively thick and may crack as it ages; when thin it retains a smoother appearance. Its dull yellow-green colour is typical of the genus. A prothallus—an outer margin of purely fungal tissue—is usually indistinct, so the lichen often blends imperceptibly into the surrounding bark or wood.

Sexual fruit bodies (apothecia) are uncommon. When present they occur singly or in small numbers, generally on weathered wood rather than on living bark. Each apothecium is tiny, seldom exceeding 0.3 mm across, and tends to lie flat against the surface. The disc margin is frequently masked by overgrowing soredia, giving the fruit body a blurred outline. Internal anatomy mirrors that of the closely related C. chrysophthalma, though C. flavovirens contains fewer crystalline granules within the hymenium.

Routine spot tests aid identification. The thallus gives negative reactions with C, K, and Pd, but fluoresces orange under long-wave ultraviolet light (UV+). Applying K and then observing under UV—either on a wet or dried sample—produces a bright yellow glow, a reaction characteristic of rhizocarpic acid, which is the principal secondary metabolite detected in this species. Together, the granular yellow-green crust, scarcity of apothecia, and distinctive chemical profile distinguish C. flavovirens from other members of Chrysothrix.

== Habit and distribution ==
The lichen is widespread in Europe, and has also been recorded from Japan and North America. In the Atlantic and Mediterranean biogeographic regions of Portugal, it prefers to grow on the acidic bark of coastal conifer trees.
