= Chrysothrix placodioides =

Scientific classification
- Kingdom: Fungi
- Division: Ascomycota
- Class: Arthoniomycetes
- Order: Arthoniales
- Family: Chrysotrichaceae
- Genus: Chrysothrix
- Species: C. placodioides

Binomial name
- Chrysothrix placodioides G.Thor (1988)

Species of lichen

Chrysothrix placodioides is a rare species of crustose lichen in the family Chrysotrichaceae. First described by Göran Thor in 1988, this Brazilian endemic species is distinguished by its placodioid thallus structure and distinctive chemical and morphological characteristics.

== Taxonomy ==
Chrysothrix placodioides was described based on collections made in 1894 by the botanist Gustaf Malme in Serra da Chapada, Mato Grosso, Brazil. The species is morphologically similar to Chrysothrix pavonii but differs by its placodioid thallus, non-byssaceous medulla, and distinctively larger spores. The species epithet placodioides alludes to its placodioid (crust-like, tightly adherent) growth form.

== Description ==
The thallus of Chrysothrix placodioides is dark yellow and placodioid, forming tightly attached, smooth patches 0.5–2 cm in diameter and about 0.1–0.4 mm thick. It lacks both a prothallus and a true cortex. The medulla is loosely structured, cretaceous (chalky), and dark yellow, lacking calcium oxalate crystals. The photobiont consists of unicellular green algae belonging to Chlorococcaceae, approximately 5–10 μm in diameter.

Apothecia (fruiting bodies) are abundant and distinctive, with a brownish-orange, flat to convex disc measuring 0.2–1.0 mm in diameter. Spores are obovate, straight, typically 3-septate (rarely 2-septate), thin-walled, hyaline, and measure 12.3–14.1 μm long by 4.2–5.2 μm wide.

Chemical analysis reveals the presence of calycin as a major lichen product along with a minor unidentified compound referred to as chry 3. Standard chemical spot tests yield reactions: C– and K+ (orange).

Chrysothrix galapagoana, described in 2013 from the Galápagos Islands, is similar in appearance to C. placodioides, but can be distinguished by its smaller granules, typically measuring (150–)170–250(–290) μm across, and by its mode of asexual reproduction, which occurs through granules produced predominantly on the upper surface of the thallus.

== Habitat and distribution ==
Chrysothrix placodioides is known from only a few collections from central Brazil, specifically within Mato Grosso. The lichen grows exclusively on acidic rocks, accompanied by other lichens such as Xanthoparmelia and Usnea. Detailed ecological characteristics beyond these associations remain poorly documented due to the rarity and limited known distribution of the species.
