= Chrysothrix galapagoana =

Scientific classification
- Kingdom: Fungi
- Division: Ascomycota
- Class: Arthoniomycetes
- Order: Arthoniales
- Family: Chrysotrichaceae
- Genus: Chrysothrix
- Species: C. galapagoana

Binomial name
- Chrysothrix galapagoana K.Knudsen & Bungartz (2013)

Species of lichen

Chrysothrix galapagoana is a species of saxicolous (rock-dwelling) crustose, leprose lichen in the family Chrysotrichaceae. Described in 2013 by the lichenologists Kerry Knudsen and Frank Bungartz, this species is endemic to the Galápagos Islands. It is distinct from other species within its genus due to its unique morphological and reproductive features.

== Taxonomy ==
Chrysothrix galapagoana was first described based on specimens collected in January 2011 on Floreana Island in the Galápagos Islands, Ecuador. Its closest morphological relative is Chrysothrix placodioides, a fertile species known from Brazil. However, C. galapagoana differs significantly in granule size and its mode of reproduction, exclusively reproducing asexually via small granules produced on the upper surface of the thallus.

== Description ==
The lichen has a thallus composed of dispersed immature granules and larger mature granules. The mature granules range in size from 150 to 290 μm in diameter and have a pseudo-areolate appearance, often creating an illusion of distinct areoles. These granules are bright neon-yellow, pseudo-corticate, and ecorticate in smaller forms. Immature granules, sized 35–70 μm, form on the upper surfaces of these larger granules and eventually disperse, a feature that distinguishes C. galapagoana from similar species.

The lichen contains a green coccoid algal photobiont, with cells measuring 7–10 μm in diameter. Apothecia and pycnidia have not been observed in this species. Chemically, the lichen primarily produces calycin, with pulvinic dilactone occasionally present in minor quantities. Standard chemical spot tests yield reactions as follows: P−, K+ (faintly reddish), C−, KC−, and UV−.

== Habitat and distribution ==
Chrysothrix galapagoana is currently known only from the Galápagos Islands, specifically from the islands of Española, Floreana, Isabela, San Cristóbal, and Santiago. The species grows on basalt boulders, rocks, and cliffs in semi-shaded to fully exposed locations, typically within the dry and lower transition vegetation zones. It occupies habitats ranging from near coastal areas to dry, open forests. Due to its restricted known range, it is considered endemic to the Galápagos archipelago.

This species was initially listed as Chrysothrix aff. occidentalis in earlier inventories but was later recognized as a separate, distinct taxon due to its morphological and chemical uniqueness.
