= Chrysothrix bergeri =

Scientific classification
- Domain: Eukaryota
- Kingdom: Fungi
- Division: Ascomycota
- Class: Arthoniomycetes
- Order: Arthoniales
- Family: Chrysotrichaceae
- Genus: Chrysothrix
- Species: C. bergeri

Binomial name
- Chrysothrix bergeri LaGreca (2020)

Species of lichen

Chrysothrix bergeri is a species of crustose lichen in the family Chrysotrichaceae. It is found in the southeastern United States and the Caribbean, where it grows as a bright yellow, powdery crust on the bark and wood of mostly hardwoods.

== Taxonomy ==
Chrysothrix bergeri was formally described as a new species in 2020 by Scott LaGreca.The type specimen was originally collected in 1922 from Confianza Estate in Cuba. Although it had previously been mentioned in the scientific literature as an undescribed species, it had not been formally named. The distribution of the lichen extends from the southeastern United States, southwards to the Bahamas and Cuba, and eastwards to Bermuda. Although found mostly on hardwoods (usually oak), other recorded substrates include Casuarina equisetifolia, Prunus caroliniana, Suriana maritima, Juniperus, Pinus, and Taxodium. The specific epithet bergeri honours Franz Berger, an Austrian medical doctor and botanical collector, "and the first person to recognize this new taxon in Bermuda".

== Description ==
The species has a bright yellow thallus that is both crustose and leprose (powdery), and which grows on both the bark and wood of trees. The granules comprising the thallus are typically 20–45 μm in diameter. Its ascospores number eight per ascus and measure about 9–15 by 3–4 μm, with 3 transverse septa. Two chemotypes of this species have been identified. One contains calycin and pinastric acid as major lichen products and leprapinic acid as a minor metabolite, while the other chemotype has only calycin.
