= Melarthonis =

Scientific classification
- Domain: Eukaryota
- Kingdom: Fungi
- Division: Ascomycota
- Class: Arthoniomycetes
- Order: Arthoniales
- Family: Chrysotrichaceae
- Genus: Melarthonis; Frisch & G.Thor (2014)
- Species: M. piceae

Binomial name
- Melarthonis piceae Frisch & G.Thor (2014)

Species of lichen

Melarthonis is fungal genus in the family Chrysotrichaceae. It is a monotypic genus, containing the single species Melarthonis piceae, a rare corticolous lichen. This lichen forms a very thin, almost invisible layer of tiny pale-green granules on tree bark, along with small black reproductive structures. It is known only from a single location in Hokkaido, Japan, where it was discovered growing on spruce trees in an old-growth forest.

== Taxonomy ==
Both the genus and species were described as new to science in 2014 by Andreas Frisch and Göran Thor. The type specimen was collected from Mount Oakan (Kushiro Province, Hokkaido) at an altitude of 420 m (1,380 ft); there, it was found growing on the bark of a spruce tree in an old-growth forest. It is only known to occur in the type locality. The genus name alludes to the black ascomata that are similar to those in genus Arthonia, while the species epithet refers to the genus of the host tree (Picea).

== Description ==
Melarthonis forms a very inconspicuous lichen layer. The thallus is sparse and made up of minute, glossy, pale-green granules only 0.02–0.05 mm across. It lacks a protective cortex, so each granule is little more than a tangle of colourless fungal threads that wrap around clusters of the green algal partner (a chlorococcoid photobiont with rounded cells 4–9 μm wide). No dark prothallus line or calcium oxalate crystals are present, and the fungal hyphae themselves are about 1 μm thick and dusted with tiny colourless crystals.

The reproductive structures are tiny black warts (ascomata) that sit flat on the bark, yet bulge strongly in the middle. Each ascoma is rounded, 0.1–0.3 mm in diameter, and has a finely warted surface; in cross-section it is 70–80 μm thick. A narrow dark-brown rim (the proper exciple, 10–15 μm wide) surrounds a clear, jelly-like interior. The outer hyphal tips project slightly and are pigmented dark brown, giving the ascoma its colour, while the very top layer (epithecium) is 3–8 μm tall. Inside, a hyaline (translucent and colourless) hymenium 35–40 μm high contains slender, club-shaped asci of the Arthonia-type (27–34 × 10–12 μm), each producing eight colourless, three-celled ascospores that taper at both ends (10.0–14.0 × 2.5–4.0 μm) and never show a pinched "waist" at the internal walls. No asexual pycnidia have been observed. Standard chemical spot tests are negative on the thallus, but the gelatinous tissue within the ascomata turns a very pale greenish blue in iodine–potassium iodide (KI+) and shows no hemi-amyloid cap (tholus) inside the asci.
