= Chrysothrix susquehannensis =

Scientific classification
- Kingdom: Fungi
- Division: Ascomycota
- Class: Arthoniomycetes
- Order: Arthoniales
- Family: Chrysotrichaceae
- Genus: Chrysothrix
- Species: C. susquehannensis

Binomial name
- Chrysothrix susquehannensis Lendemer & Elix (2010)

Species of lichen

Chrysothrix susquehannensis is a species of crustose, leprose lichen in the family Chrysotrichaceae. Known to occur only in the northeastern United States, the species is notable for being the first within its genus known to contain lecanoric acid, distinguishing it chemically from related species.

== Taxonomy ==
Chrysothrix susquehannensis was formally described in 2010 by the lichenologists James Lendemer and John Elix. It was described based on specimens collected in 2009 from rocky cliffs along the lower Susquehanna River in Lancaster County, Pennsylvania. The specific epithet susquehannensis refers to the Susquehanna River region, from where the species was first identified. Phylogenetically and morphologically, it resembles Chrysothrix onokoensis, but it is set apart by its unique chemical composition and substrate preference.

== Description ==
Chrysothrix susquehannensis forms a thin, crustose and leprose (powdery) thallus ranging from dull lemon-yellow to greenish in color. Initially, its thallus consists of sparsely distributed granules that eventually accumulate into small overlapping heaps. These heaps merge to create indistinct rosettes measuring 0.1–0.3 mm thick, with diffuse edges. The individual granules are ecorticate (lacking an outer cortex), round, and measure 40–90 μm in diameter. Each granule has a gelatinous layer of hyaline (transparent) hyphae surrounding a core of chlorococcoid green algal cells, which measure about 9–11 μm in diameter. Apothecia and pycnidia have not been observed in this species.

Chemically, this lichen contains major amounts of rhizocarpic acid and minor amounts of epanorin, lecanoric acid, atranorin, and traces of conrhizocarpic acid. It produces specific reactions in chemical spot tests: K−, C+ (pink/red), KC+ (pink/red), P−, and UV+ (orange).

== Habitat and distribution ==
At the time of its original publication, Chrysothrix susquehannensis was known only from its type locality along the lower Susquehanna River, specifically in Lancaster County, Pennsylvania. It inhabits small moss cushions and organic matter accumulations on shaded, vertical rock faces. Due to the challenging accessibility of these habitats, additional populations, although likely present nearby, have not been extensively documented.

The region is recognized for its unique flora and ecological significance, hosting several rare and geographically limited species. Given its apparent rarity and restricted habitat, Chrysothrix susquehannensis is considered a candidate for protective status at state or federal levels.
