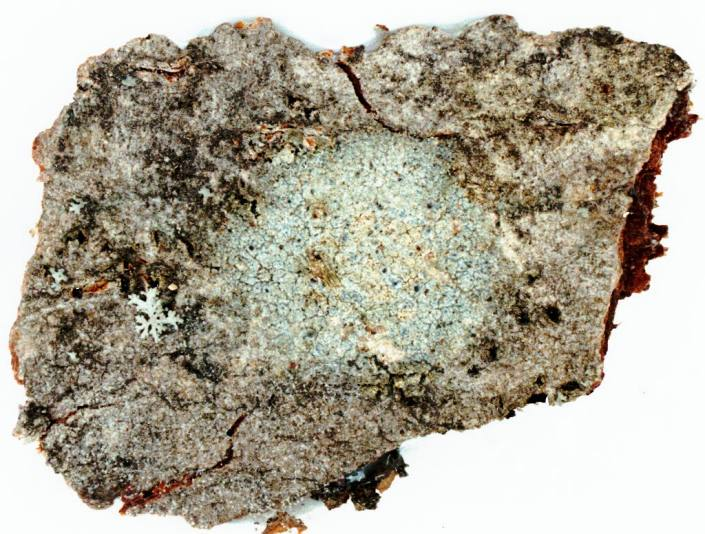

Conservation status
- Secure (NatureServe)

Scientific classification
- Kingdom: Fungi
- Division: Ascomycota
- Class: Arthoniomycetes
- Order: Arthoniales
- Family: Chrysotrichaceae
- Genus: Chrysothrix
- Species: C. caesia

Binomial name
- Chrysothrix caesia (Flot. ex Körb.) Ertz & Tehler (2011)

Synonyms
- Leprantha caesia Flot. ex Körb. (1855); Arthonia caesia (Flot. ex Körb.) Körb. (1861); Allarthonia caesia (Flot. ex Körb.) Zahlbr. (1903); Plearthonis caesia (Flot. ex Körb.) Clem. (1909); Coniangium caesium Flot. (1855)

= Chrysothrix caesia =

Species of lichen

Chrysothrix caesia is a species of crustose, leprose lichen in the family Chrysotrichaceae. It grows on deciduous tree bark in Europe and North America.

== Taxonomy ==
The species was first described by Julius von Flotow in Gustav Wilhelm Körber's 1855 work Systema Lichenum Germaniae. Flotow assigned it to the genus Leprantha with the species epithet caesia. The protologue indicates that Flotow had previously referred to this species in literature as Coniangii sp. The type specimens are listed as "Fw. LE. 117 A. B." (belonging to the exsiccata Flotow, Lich. Exs.). According to the habitat information, the species was collected from several locations in what is now Poland: near Wohlau (now Wołów) on white beeches and maples, in the park of Stonsdorf (now Staniszów) on lindens, and in the Oderwald near Leubus (now Lubiąż) on white beeches. The text also establishes a relationship between this species and Lepra aeruginosa. Körber later transferred the taxon to Arthonia in 1861, as "A. CAESIA (Fw.) Kbr." in his Parerga lichenologica (page 295), and noted that additional exsiccata specimens were available as "Kbr. LG. 77.", that means Körber, Lich. Sel. Germ. no. 77. He also remarked that locations of this delicate lichen outside of Silesia were not known to him.

The species was commonly known as a member of this genus for more than a century. However, molecular phylogenetics analysis by Nelson and colleagues (2009) revealed that Arthonia caesia unexpectedly clustered with Chrysotrichaceae rather than with other members of Arthoniaceae. This placement was described as "strongly supported" but "unexpected". The researchers noted, however, that fertile species of Chrysothrix are very similar to Arthonia in ascoma morphology and anatomy, and particularly A. caesia and its allies can be considered as non-pigmented species of Chrysothrix in terms of apothecial anatomy, morphology, and thallus structure (including the chlorococcoid photobiont). Based on this phylogenetic evidence, Damien Ertz and Anders Tehler formally reclassified it in the genus Chrysothrix in 2011.

In North America, the species has been colloquially referred to as the "frosted comma lichen" (when it was still in the genus Arthonia, the "comma lichens"), and "fool's gold dust".

== Description ==
Chrysothrix caesia has a well-developed but thin crustose thallus that ranges in colour from blue-green to white-green. Although it lacks vegetative propagules (like isidia or soredia), it typically has numerous apothecia (fruiting bodies). They are rounded to irregularly shaped, black, and measure 0.2–0.4 mm, and are covered with a whit pruina. Specimens of this lichen in urban habitats tend to be less well developed (thinner, lighter in color, and with smaller apothecia) than those in more natural habitats.
