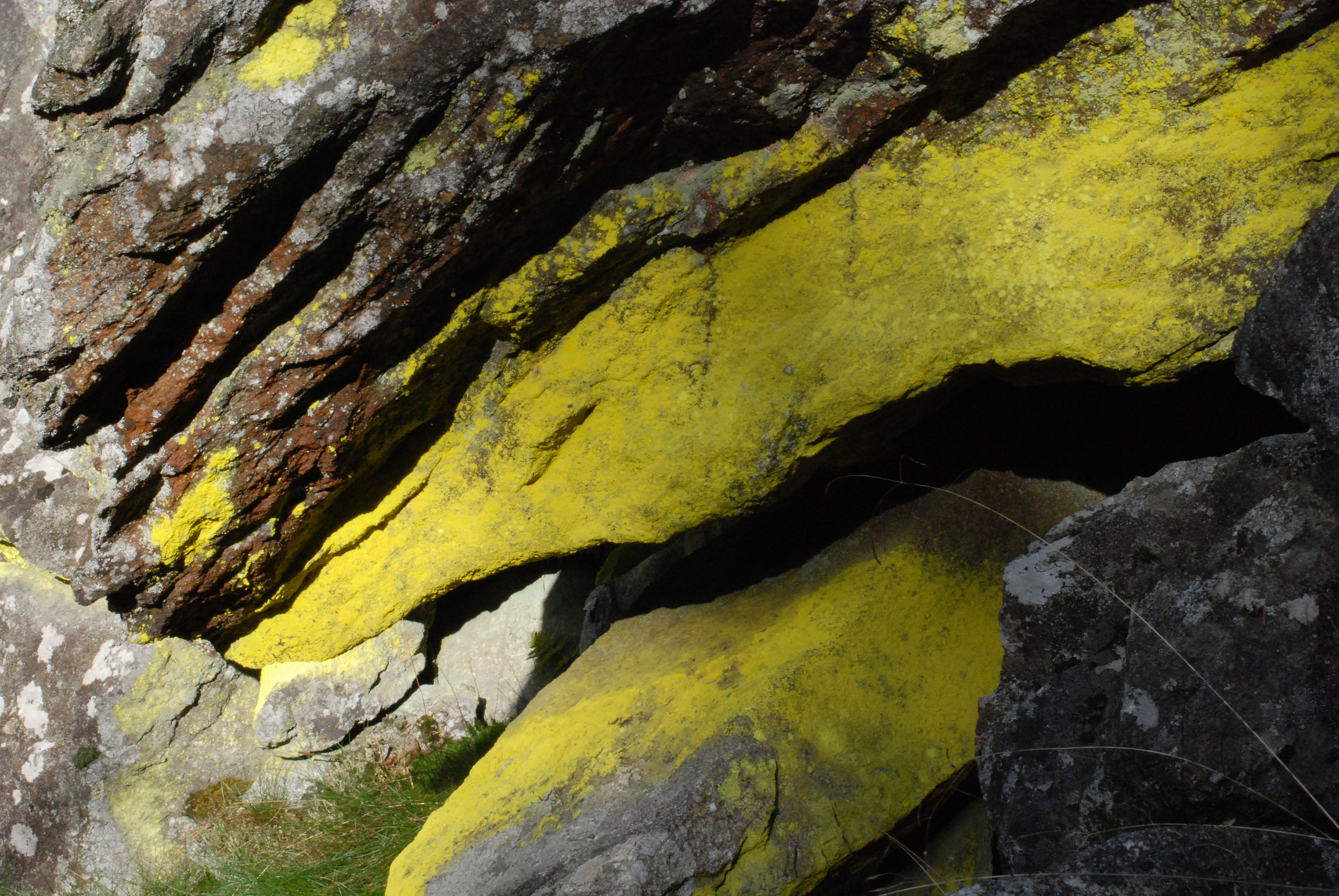
- Chrysothrix chlorina, Unteres Rannatal, Austria

Scientific classification
- Domain: Eukaryota
- Kingdom: Fungi
- Division: Ascomycota
- Class: Arthoniomycetes
- Order: Arthoniales
- Family: Chrysotrichaceae
- Genus: Chrysothrix; Mont. (1852)

Type species
- Chrysothrix noli-tangere (Mont.) Mont. (1852)

Synonyms
- Alysphaeria Turpin (1827); Amphilomopsis Jatta (1905); Peribotryon Fr. (1832); Plearthonis Clem. (1909); Pulveraria Ach. (1803); Temnospora A.Massal. (1860)

= Chrysothrix =

Genus of lichens

Chrysothrix is a genus of lichen-forming fungi in the family Chrysotrichaceae. They are commonly called gold dust lichens or sulfur dust lichens, because they are bright yellow to greenish-yellow, sometimes flecked with orange, and composed entirely of powdery soredia. Apothecia are never present in North American specimens.

They grow on bark or rocks, generally in shaded habitats. They can sometimes be mistaken for sterile specimens of Chaenotheca, which usually has pinhead apothecia on tiny stalks, or Psilolechia, which usually has small, bright yellow apothecia. Chrysothrix chlorina was traditionally used as a brown dye for wool in Scandinavia.

== Taxonomy ==
The genus Chrysothrix was circumscribed by the French botanist Camille Montagne in 1852, initially with only a single species, Chrysothrix noli-tangere, recognized for its distinctive growth on cactus spines in South America. Montagne named the genus from the Greek words chrysos ('golden') and thrix ('hair'), referring to the bright yellow, hair-like appearance of the lichens.

Historically, Chrysothrix was regarded as a monotypic genus, until Jack Laundon's comprehensive revision in 1981 expanded the genus significantly. Laundon discovered that several yellow, powdery lichens previously classified under other genera, such as Lepraria, Pulveraria, and Crocynia, shared critical anatomical features with Chrysothrix, particularly the structure of their apothecia (lichen fruiting bodies). Consequently, he reclassified several species, increasing the genus to four distinct species: C. candelaris, C. chlorina, C. chrysophthalma, and C. pavonii.

The type species was originally listed as Chrysothrix noli-tangere due to Montagne’s original description. However, Laundon clarified the taxonomic history in 1981, explaining that the name C. noli-tangere was illegitimate because its original description (as Cilicia noli-tangere by Montagne in 1834) included reference to an earlier validly published name, Peribotryon pavonii, described by Elias Magnus Fries in 1832. Therefore, Laundon established Chrysothrix pavonii as the correct name for this species, honoring its original collector, José Antonio Pavón Jiménez.

Laundon's revision also addressed issues of nomenclatural stability. Although Pulveraria, described by Erik Acharius in 1803, technically predated Chrysothrix, this name had fallen out of use since 1886 and was based on a sterile lichen, making it difficult to apply accurately. Recognizing the importance of maintaining stability in lichen nomenclature, Laundon successfully proposed conserving Chrysothrix over the earlier name Pulveraria. Additionally, in 2012, he formally proposed conserving Chrysothrix against another older name, Alysphaeria, published in 1827. The Nomenclature Committee for Fungi accepted this proposal in 2017, further solidifying Chrysothrix as the accepted genus name despite these historical complexities.

== Description ==
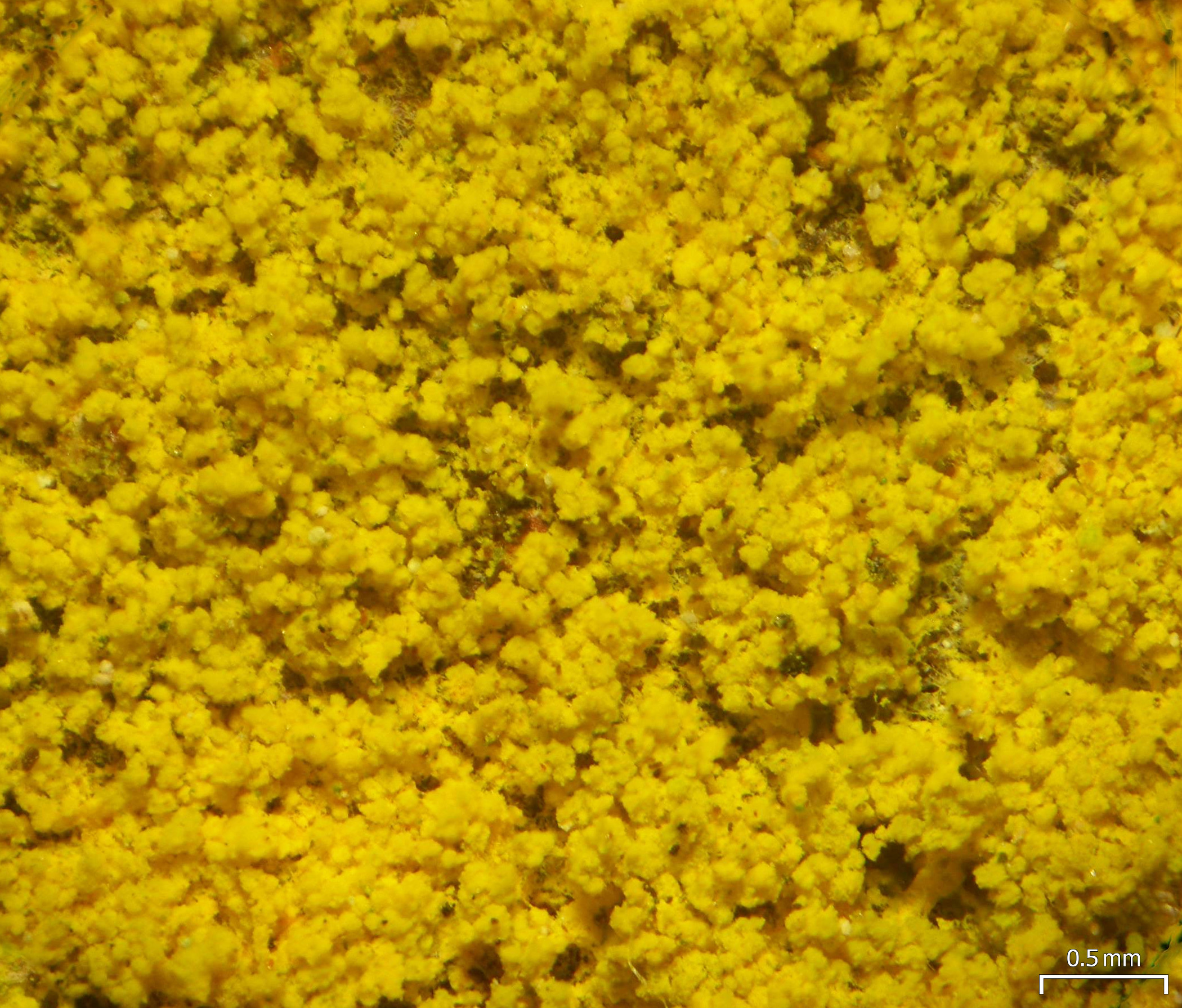
Closeup of thallus granules of Chrysothrix onokoensis; scale bar = 0.5 mm

The genus Chrysothrix is characterized by its bright yellow to yellow-green, powdery (leprose) lichens. Its thallus, or body, is usually granular or filamentous, appearing crust-like or fluffy, without a clear margin or lobes. These lichens are non-layered and uniformly colored throughout due to the presence of pulvinic acid derivatives, substances responsible for their vivid pigmentation. The specific compounds identified in Chrysothrix include calycin, pinastric acid, rhizocarpic acid, and vulpinic acid, which also assist in protecting the lichens from herbivory.

Microscopically, Chrysothrix consists of branched and interwoven hyphae (fungal filaments), often bearing small crystals. The algae partners within the lichens are green algae (Chlorophyceae), with spherical cells usually occurring individually or grouped.

Reproductive structures (apothecia) in this genus are uncommon and usually small, with diameters reaching up to about 2 mm. When present, these apothecia are typically circular or spherical, with poorly defined margins, and range in color from greenish-yellow to brownish-orange, often obscured by a yellowish powder. The internal structure includes loosely interwoven fungal filaments forming the excipulum and a distinct upper layer (epithecium) of extensively branched and interconnected filaments (paraphyses). The spores are typically narrow, elongated, clear, and divided into four segments by three transverse septa.

== Habitat and distribution ==
Chrysothrix species have a wide distribution, found globally except in major desert regions and polar extremes. They commonly inhabit shaded, acidic substrates such as tree bark, decaying wood, and rock surfaces, typically favoring environments shielded from intense sunlight and areas free from nitrogenous pollution. Specific habitat preferences vary among species, with some adapted to oceanic climates in Western Europe and others growing predominantly in boreal or tropical regions. The genus occurs from low to moderate altitudes, although some species are adapted to high-altitude environments, reaching elevations up to approximately 3,350 meters. Seven Chrysothrix species occur in Australia.

== Species ==
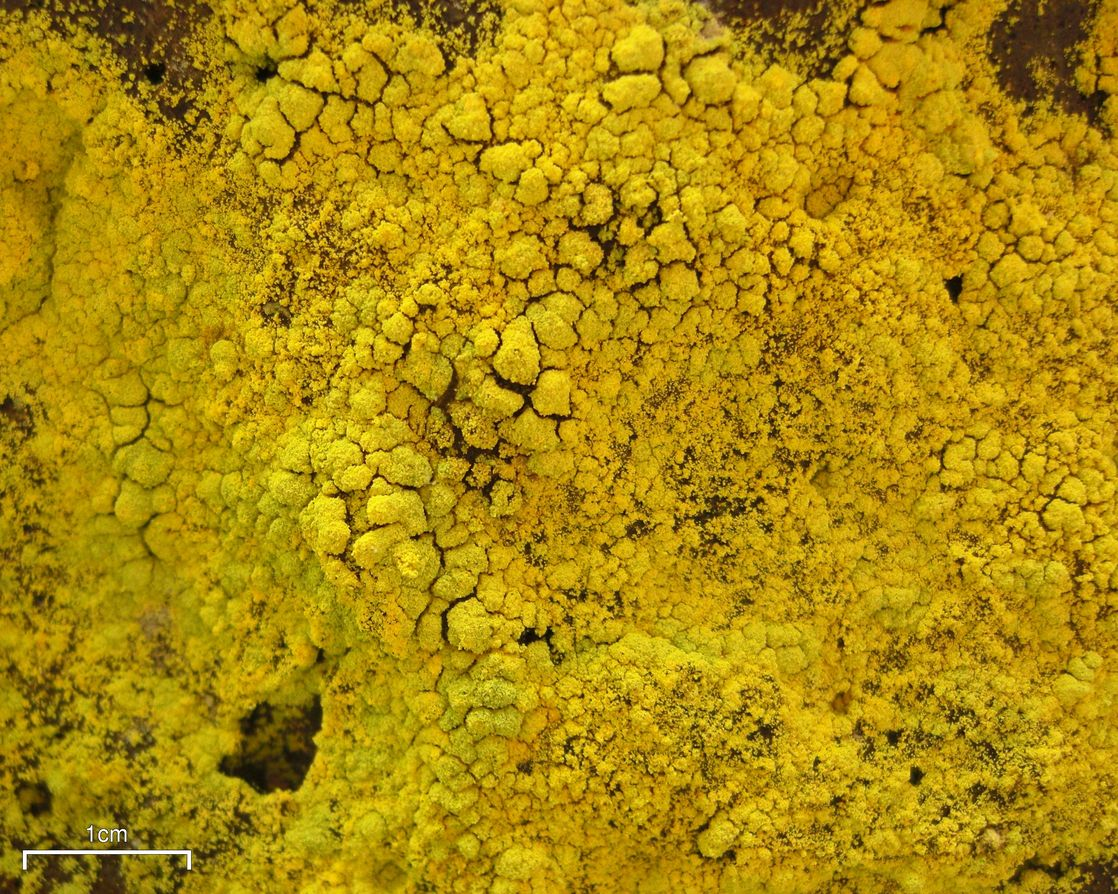
Chrysothrix candelaris

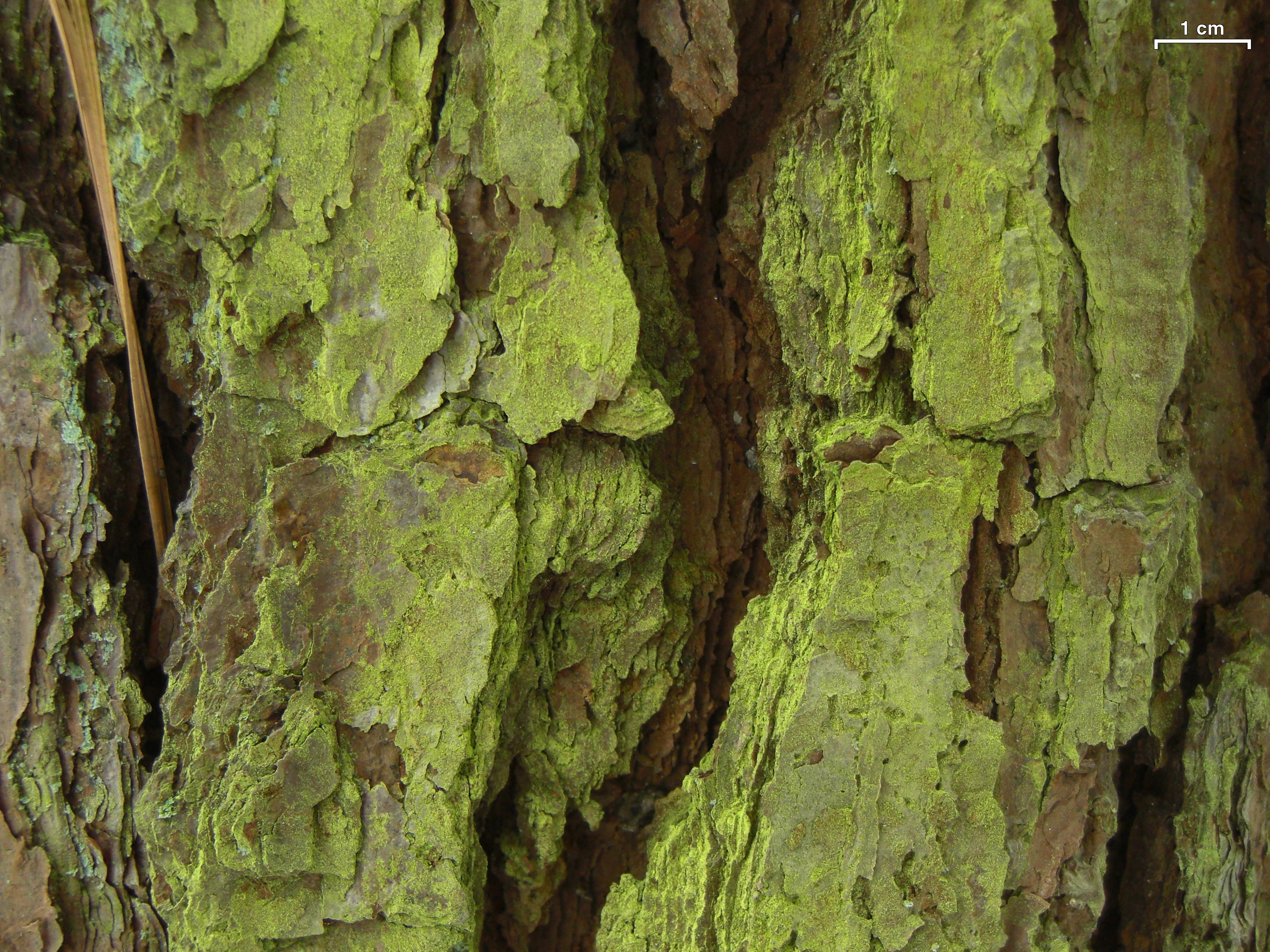
Chrysothrix chamaecyparicola

- Chrysothrix bergeri LaGreca (2020) – southeastern United States; the Caribbean; Bermuda
- Chrysothrix caesia (Flot.) Ertz & Tehler (2011) – Europe; North America
- Chrysothrix candelaris (L.) J.R.Laundon (1981) – Europe; North America
- Chrysothrix chamaecyparicola Lendemer (2010) – eastern North America
- Chrysothrix chilensis D.Liu & J.-S Hur (2018) – Chile
- Chrysothrix chlorina (Ach.) J.R.Laundon (1981)
- Chrysothrix chrysophthalma (P.James) P.James & J.R.Laundon (1981) – Europe
- Chrysothrix citrinella Aptroot & M.Cáceres (2017) – Brazil
- Chrysothrix fagicola Malíček & Vondrák (2023) – Europe
- Chrysothrix flavovirens Tønsberg (1994)
- Chrysothrix frischii Kalb (2001)
- Chrysothrix galapagoana K.Knudsen & Bungartz (2013)
- Chrysothrix granulosa G.Thor (1988) – South America
- Chrysothrix insulizans R.C.Harris & Ladd (2008) – United States
- Chrysothrix occidentalis Elix & Kantvilas (2007) – Australia
- Chrysothrix onokoensis (Wolle) R.C.Harris & Ladd (2008) – United States
- Chrysothrix palaeophila Kantvilas & Elix (2007) – Australia
- Chrysothrix pavonii (Fr.) J.R.Laundon (1981)
- Chrysothrix placodioides G.Thor (1988) – South America
- Chrysothrix septemseptata Jagad.Ram, Lumbsch, Lücking & G.P.Sinha (2006) – India
- Chrysothrix susquehannensis Lendemer & Elix (2010) – eastern North America
- Chrysothrix tchupalensis Elix & Kantvilas (2007) – Australia
- Chrysothrix xanthina (Vain.) Kalb (2001) – widespread

The taxon Chrysothrix oceanica, proposed by Veli Räsänen in 1944 from a single specimen collected in Fiji, was excluded from the genus by Laundon. Because of the presence of pulvinic acid derivatives in the specimen, he suggested it might belong in Caloplaca.
