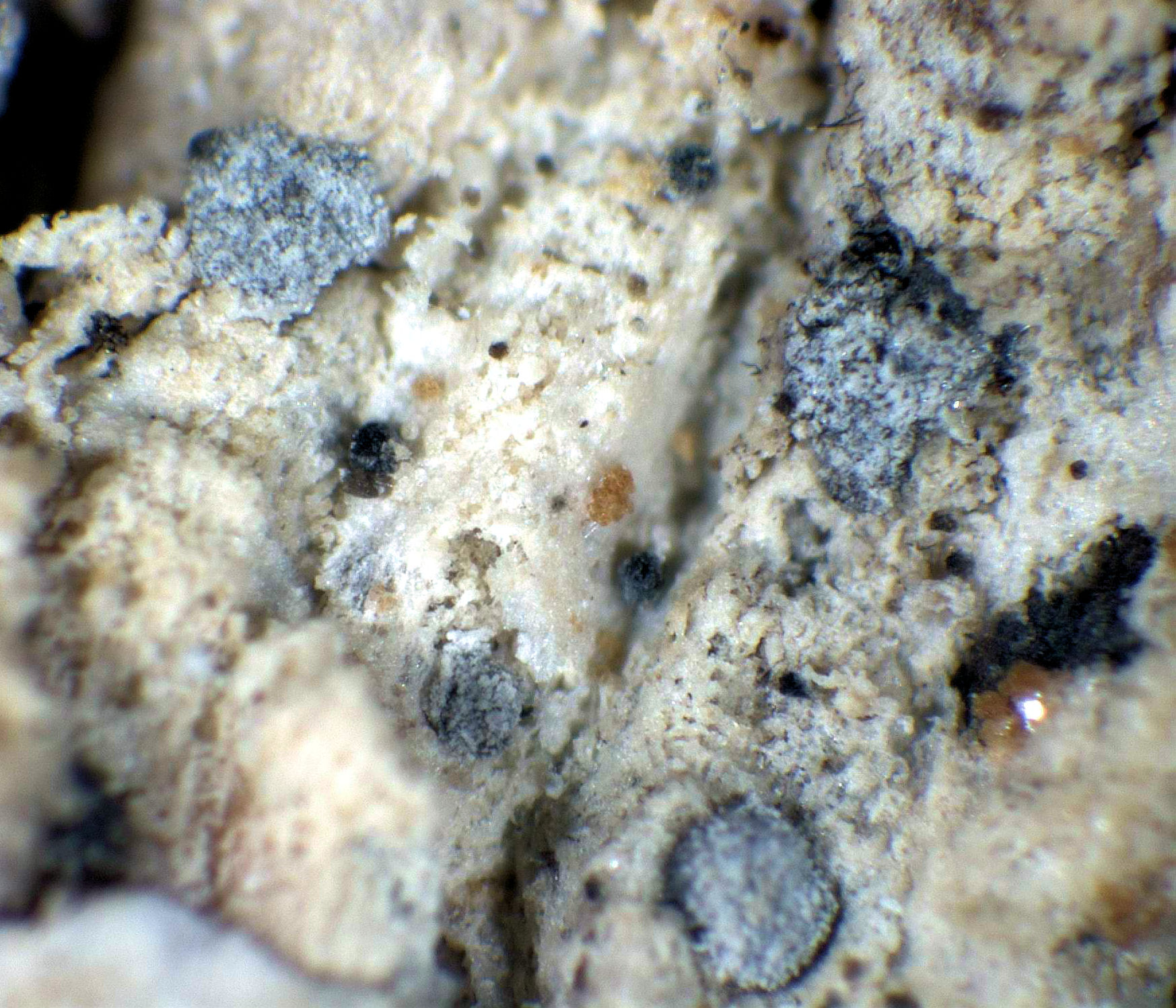
- Leprantha cinereopruinosa

Scientific classification
- Domain: Eukaryota
- Kingdom: Fungi
- Division: Ascomycota
- Class: Arthoniomycetes
- Order: Arthoniales
- Family: Arthoniaceae
- Genus: Leprantha; Dufour ex Körb. (1855)
- Species: L. cinereopruinosa

Binomial name
- Leprantha cinereopruinosa (Schaer.) Körb. (1855)

Synonyms
- Arthonia cinereopruinosa Schaer. (1850); Trachylia cinereopruinosa (Schaer.) A.Massal. (1853)

= Leprantha =

Genus of lichens

Leprantha is a fungal genus in the family Arthoniaceae. It comprises a single species, Leprantha cinereopruinosa, a corticolous (bark-dwelling), crustose lichen.

== Taxonomy ==
Leprantha cinereopruinosa was originally described by the Swiss lichenologist Ludwig Schaerer, who classified it in the genus Arthonia. Abramo Bartolommeo Massalongo proposed a transfer to the genus Trachylia in 1853. Gustav Wilhelm Körber circumscribed the genus in 1855 to contain the species. In 2018, Leprantha was resurrected as a genus to accommodate Arthonia cinereopruinosa. This decision was based on molecular phylogenetic analysis using mtSSU sequences, which showed that A. cinereopruinosa formed a well-supported clade with Arthonia ilicina, separate from other Arthonia species. The resurrection of Leprantha as a distinct genus was part of ongoing efforts to clarify generic relationships within the Arthoniaceae using molecular data.

Three species once classified in Leprantha have since been transferred to other genera or considered synonymous with other taxa. Leprantha caesia Flot. ex Körb. (1855) is now Chrysothrix caesia; Leprantha fuliginosa (Turner & Borrer) Körb. (1855) is now Spiloma fuliginosum; and Leprantha impolita (Hoffm.) Körb. (1855) is now Pachnolepia pruinata.

== Description ==
Leprantha has a crustose thallus, meaning it forms a thin, crust-like layer tightly attached to the surface on which it grows. The reproductive structures of this lichen are apothecia, which are disc-shaped and initially partially embedded in the thallus (semi-immersed). As they mature, they project slightly above the surface and can be rounded, elliptical, or weakly lobed. The apothecia often have a frosted appearance (pruinose disc), but lack a distinct outer rim (proper margin).

The proper exciple, which is the outer edge of the apothecia, is poorly developed and composed of brown fungal filaments (hyphae). The uppermost layer of the apothecium (epithecium) is brownish, while the spore-producing region below (hymenium) is colourless or slightly yellowish and turns red when stained with iodine-based stain. The paraphysoids, which are branched, hair-like filaments that support the developing spores, are slender and interconnected (anastomosing), with their tips capped by a distinctive structure.

The spore sacs (asci) in Leprantha typically contain 6–8 spores. These asci are broadly club-shaped (clavate) to nearly spherical (subglobose) and are semi-fissitunicate, meaning they have a double-layered wall that partially separates when the spores are released. The asci have a large dome-shaped tip and a clear area at the top known as the ocular chamber but lack the complex internal layers seen in some other lichen genera.

The ascospores are divided by 2–5 internal walls (septate), narrowly oval (ovoid) in shape, and pointed at one end, with the opposite terminal cells distinctly larger. These spores are colourless (hyaline) when young but may turn pale brown as they age. In addition to sexual reproduction, Leprantha produces asexual reproductive structures called pycnidia. These are small, black, flask-shaped structures that are partially embedded in the thallus. The conidia (asexual spores) produced in these pycnidia are rod-shaped (bacilliform) and straight.

The photobiont (photosynthetic partner) in this lichen is Trentepohlia, a green alga. The thallus contains the chemical compound psoromic acid, which is common in many lichens.
