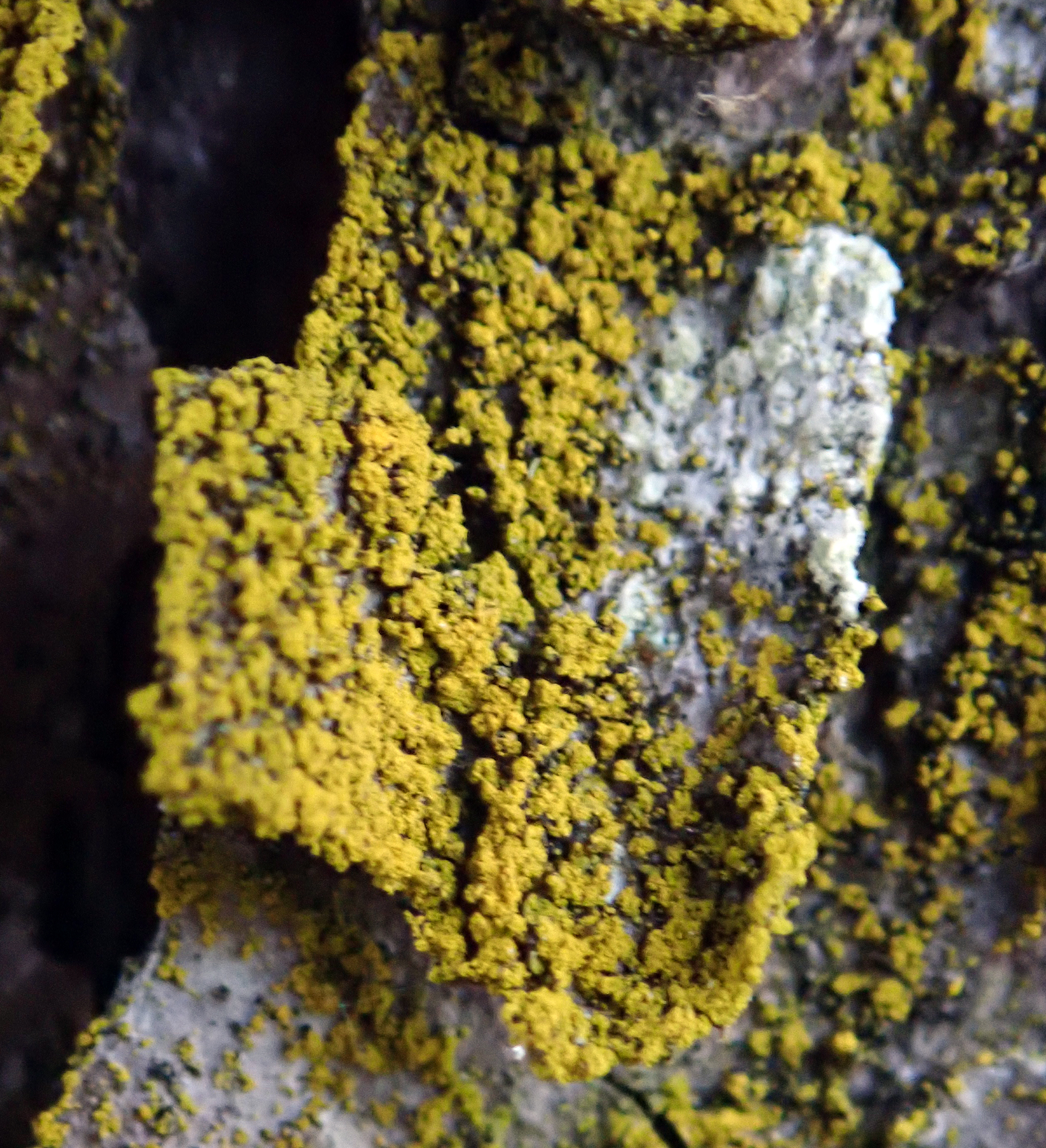

Scientific classification
- Kingdom: Fungi
- Division: Ascomycota
- Class: Arthoniomycetes
- Order: Arthoniales
- Family: Chrysotrichaceae
- Genus: Chrysothrix
- Species: C. granulosa

Binomial name
- Chrysothrix granulosa G.Thor (1988)

= Chrysothrix granulosa =

Coastal gold dust lichen

Species of lichen

Chrysothrix granulosa, the coastal gold dust lichen, is a brilliant yellow, powdery (leprose) lichen that grows in irregular patches mostly on bark (sometimes wood and rock) in shaded dry areas of coastal western North America and western South America.

In North America it is found from Mexico to as far north as British Columbia. It can be found in coastal areas of California near Santa Barbara County, and coastal areas of the Sonoran Desert, mostly islands off Baja California. In South America it is found from Chile to Peru. It is found at elevations from sea-level to 400 metres (1,300 ft).

The mostly structureless body (thallus) forms powdery cushions of lichen granules (soredia) over a fluffy middle layer (medulla). The upper medulla is yellow fading to yellow-white in the lower part. It lacks fruiting bodies (apothecia). Fruiting bodies (apothecia are absent in populations in California and the Sonoran Desert, and elsewhere have a constricted base with 0.2 to 1 mm diameter brownish orange flat to convex discs.

Lichen spot tests are K+ orange, C−, KC−, and P+ orange, with UV+ a dullish dark orange. Secondary metabolites include calycin acid and diffractaic acid.
