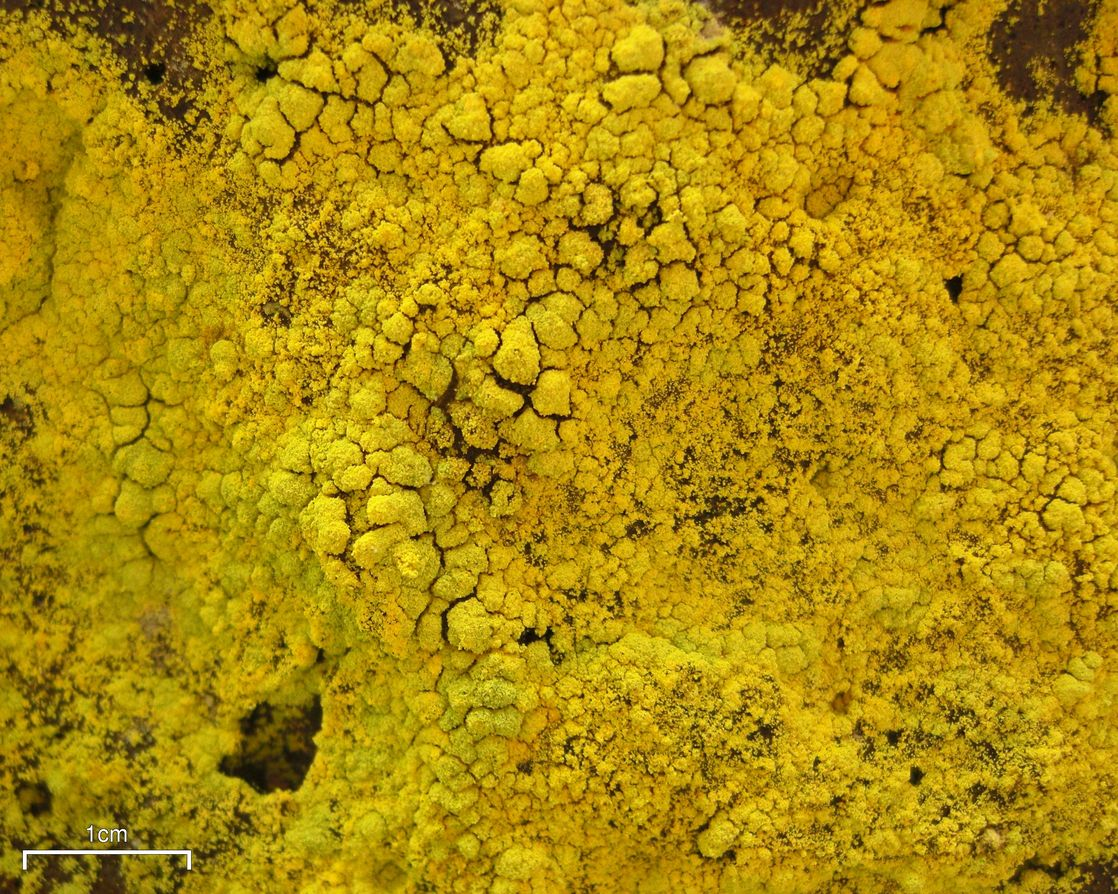

Conservation status
- Secure (NatureServe)

Scientific classification
- Kingdom: Fungi
- Division: Ascomycota
- Class: Arthoniomycetes
- Order: Arthoniales
- Family: Chrysotrichaceae
- Genus: Chrysothrix
- Species: C. candelaris

Binomial name
- Chrysothrix candelaris (L.) J.R.Laundon (1981)

Synonyms
- Byssus candelaris L. (1753); Lichen flavus Schreb. (1771); Lepraria flava (Schreb.) Ach. (1798); Lepraria candelaria(L.) Fr. (1824); Crocynia flava (Schreb.) Hue (1924)

= Chrysothrix candelaris =

Species of lichen

Chrysothrix candelaris, commonly known as the mustard powder lichen or gold dust lichen, is a species of leprose (powdery) lichen in the family Chrysothricaceae. It typically grows on tree bark, although it has also been recorded growing on rock. It does not show ascocarps or other reproductive structures, belonging to the group commonly known as the 'Fungi or lichens imperfecti' in the UK.

== Distribution ==
This lichen is widespread and common in the United Kingdom, where it occurs on the bark of deciduous trees, especially rugged old specimens, such as sycamore, alder, oak, willow, beech, and pine species, normally in dry shaded parts. and occasionally on the sheltered faces of siliceous rocks. It is found in North America, Scotland, Hungary, Iran, Latvia and has been recorded in the Cape Verde Islands.

== Description ==
As suggested by its name, C. candelaris is bright yellow, orange-yellow, or greenish-yellow. It has a powdery (leprose) appearance, a superficial thallus and lacks apothecia and isidia. Because its thallus is made entirely of powdery soredia that covers the substrate like a crust, Chrysothrix candelaris is a leprose lichen.

Laundon described three chemotypes of this species: one with the chemical cyclin, one with pinastric acid, and a third with both of these compounds.

== Life cycle ==
Lacking apothecia, soredia and isidia, C. candelaris is not able to reproduce by spores, but spreads by its thallus becoming distributed by the wind, the feet of animals, etc. to suitable habitats.

== Miscellaneous ==
This lichen can be used as an indicator to monitor air quality.

== See also ==
- List of lichens named by Carl Linnaeus
