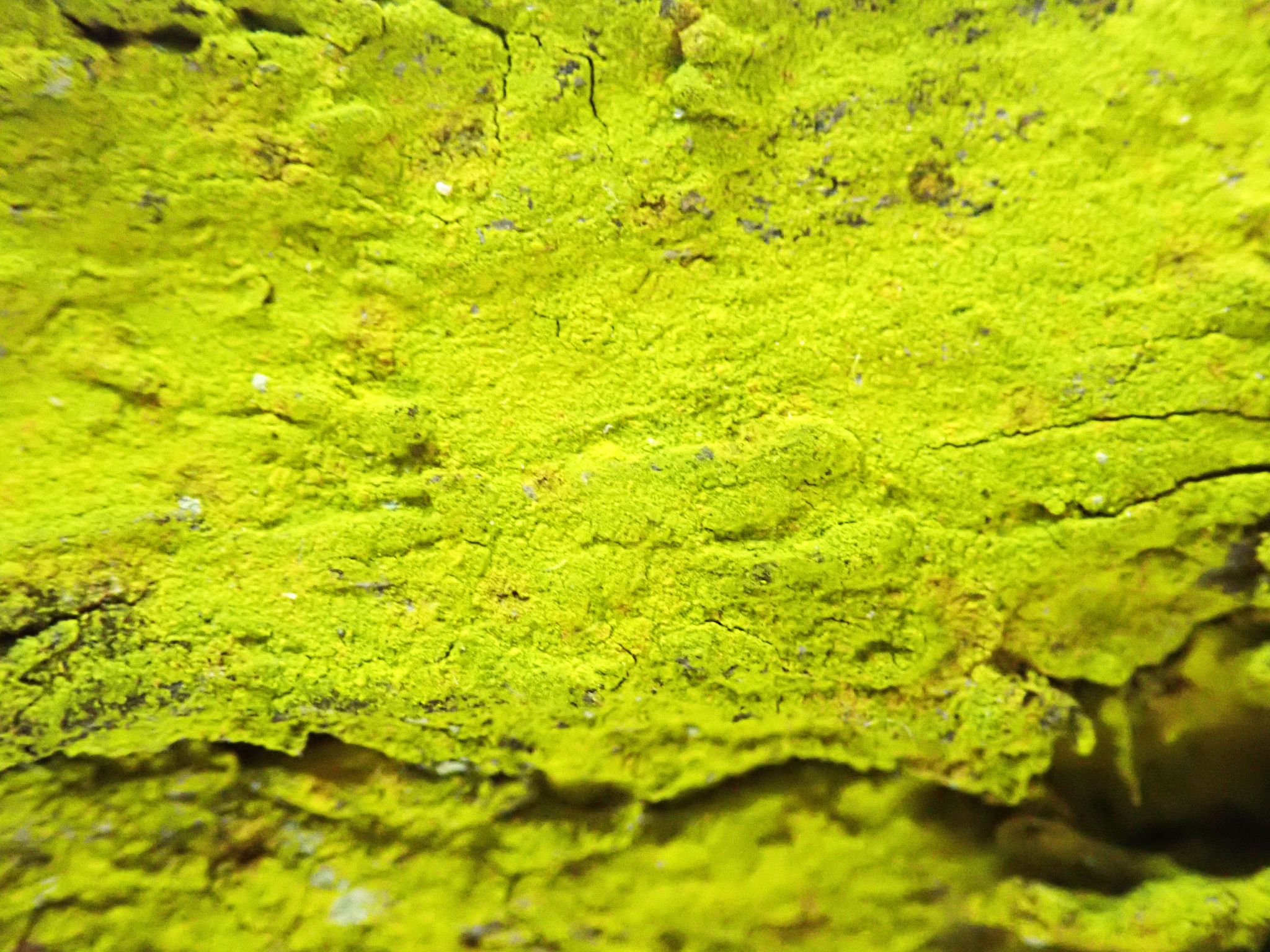
- Chrysothrix xanthina

Scientific classification
- Kingdom: Fungi
- Division: Ascomycota
- Class: Arthoniomycetes
- Order: Arthoniales
- Family: Chrysotrichaceae; Zahlbr. (1905)

Type genus
- Chrysothrix Mont. (1852)

Genera
- Byssocaulon; Chrysothrix; Galbinothrix; Melarthonis

Synonyms
- Pulverariaceae Kostel. (1831)

= Chrysotrichaceae =

Family of lichen-forming fungi

Chrysotrichaceae is a family of lichenized fungi in the order Arthoniales. Member of this family have a widespread distribution, but are especially prevalent in tropical areas. "Chrysothrichaceae" and "Chrysothricaceae" are alternative spellings that have been used in some older publications; the latter was used by Alexander Zahlbruckner in the protologue publication. Both of these spellings are considered incorrect, and the current spelling has been formalised following a proposal for conservation of Chrysotrichaceae against Pulverariaceae (an earlier synonym).

== Genera ==
- Byssocaulon Mont. (1835) – 1 sp.
- Chrysothrix Mont. (1852) – ca. 18 spp.
- Galbinothrix Frisch, G.Thor, K.H.Moon & Y.Ohmura (2018) – 1 sp.
- Melarthonis Frisch & G.Thor (2014) – 1 sp.
