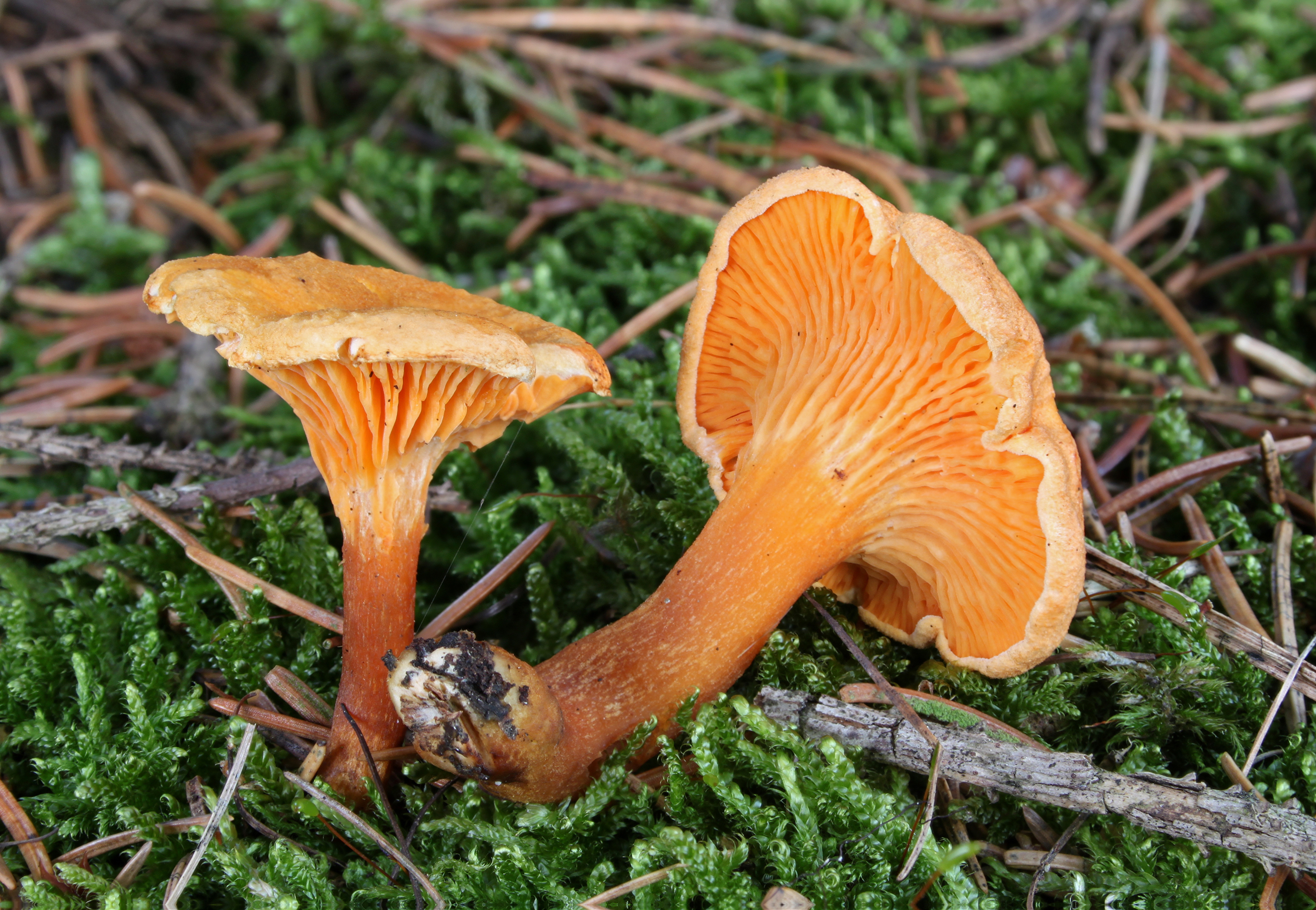
- Hygrophoropsis aurantiaca

Scientific classification
- Kingdom: Fungi
- Division: Basidiomycota
- Class: Agaricomycetes
- Order: Boletales
- Family: Hygrophoropsidaceae
- Genus: Hygrophoropsis (J.Schröt.) Maire ex Martin-Sans (1929)

Type species
- Hygrophoropsis aurantiaca (Wulfen) Maire (1921)

Diversity
- 16 species

Synonyms
- Cantharellus subgen. Hygrophoropsis J.Schröt. (1888)

= Hygrophoropsis =

Genus of fungi

Hygrophoropsis is a genus of gilled fungi in the family Hygrophoropsidaceae. It was circumscribed in 1888 to contain the type species, H. aurantiaca, a widespread fungus that, based on its appearance, has been affiliated with Cantharellus, Clitocybe, and Paxillus. Modern molecular phylogenetic analysis shows that the genus belongs to the suborder Coniophorineae of the order Boletales.

There are 16 accepted species of Hygrophoropsis, found in both the Northern and Southern Hemispheres. Hygrophoropsis is a saprophytic genus that causes brown rot in the wood it colonises. The fruit bodies grow on the ground in woodlands, on moss, peat, and on woodchips. They are convex to infundibuliform (funnel-shaped) and have decurrent, forked brightly colored gills. The spores are dextrinoid, meaning that they stain reddish-brown in Melzer's reagent. Because H. aurantiaca has orange gills, it has been mistaken for a chanterelle, and hence it has been called a false chanterelle.

== Taxonomy ==
Hygrophoropsis was originally circumscribed in 1888 by German mycologist Joseph Schröter as a subgenus of Cantharellus. It contained a single species, the widespread H. aurantiaca, commonly known as the false chanterelle. German naturalist Bernhard Studer-Steinhäuslin concluded in 1900 that the fungus was more appropriately placed in the genus Clitocybe, based on its white spores, decurrent gills, and lack of a ring on the stipe. This classification was adopted in the early writings of influential mycologist Rolf Singer, who in 1943 proposed that Hygrophoropsis should be a subgenus of Clitocybe.

French naturalist Emile Martin-Sans elevated Hygrophoropsis to the status of genus in his 1929 publication L'Empoisonnement par les champignons et particulièrement les intoxications dues aux Agaricacées du groupe des Clitocybe et du groupe des Cortinarius, while attributing authorship to his countryman René Maire. According to Martin-Sans, he concurred with Maire's assessment of Hygrophoropsis, suggesting that it represented a form intermediate between Cantharellus and Clitocybe, and was thus worthy of generic rank. The name Hygrophoropsis refers to a likeness (Greek: ὄψις, opsis) to the genus Hygrophorus.

- Boletales
  - - - - - - Boletineae
            - Paxillineae
          - Sclerodermatineae
        - Suillineae
      - - Hygrophoropsidaceae
          - Hygrophoropsis
          - Leucogyrophana
        - Coniophorineae
    - Serpulaceae
  - - Tapinellineae

Cladogram showing phylogenetic relationships of Hygrophoropsis with major clades of the Boletales.

Hygrophoropsis aurantiaca has been confused with the true chanterelles (genus Cantharellus) because of overall similarities in appearance. A combination of characters—including forked gills, frequently off-centre stipe placement, and dextrinoid spores—suggested to others a relationship with Paxillus. These characteristics prompted Singer to classify the genus Hygrophoropsis in the Paxillaceae in 1946, although others placed it in the Tricholomataceae, a family that has been described as a wastebasket taxon. Singer initially included only two species, both with dextrinoid spores—H. aurantiaca and H. tapinia. He justified the placement of Hygrophoropsis in the Paxillaceae largely on fruit body morphology and spore size: "The discovery of a second species, H. tapinia, with smaller spores and an external appearance frankly suggesting Paxillus curtisii but never met with in Clitocybe, makes the affinity between Hygrophoropsis and Paxillus an established fact." In 1975, he added H. olida, a species with inamyloid but cyanophilous spores, whose characteristics otherwise aligned with the type species.

Hygrophoropsis is now the type genus of the family Hygrophoropsidaceae, circumscribed by Robert Kühner in 1980 to contain it and the genus Omphalotus. Singer considered this family to be "transient between Tricholomatales and Boletales". Molecular phylogenetic analysis confirmed its affinity lay in the order Boletales in 1997, though later research showed that it is not closely related to Paxillus or other gilled boletes. Instead, it is most closely related to the genus Leucogyrophana. Hygrophoropsis and Leucogyrophana are sister to Coniophora, near the base of the cladogram representing the Boletales.

The presence of several pigments in the type species, including variegatic acid, variegatorubin, and several other derivatives of pulvinic acid, suggests a chemotaxic relationship with the Boletaceae, Coniophoraceae, and Paxillaceae—families of Boletales with members that have similar compounds.

== Description ==
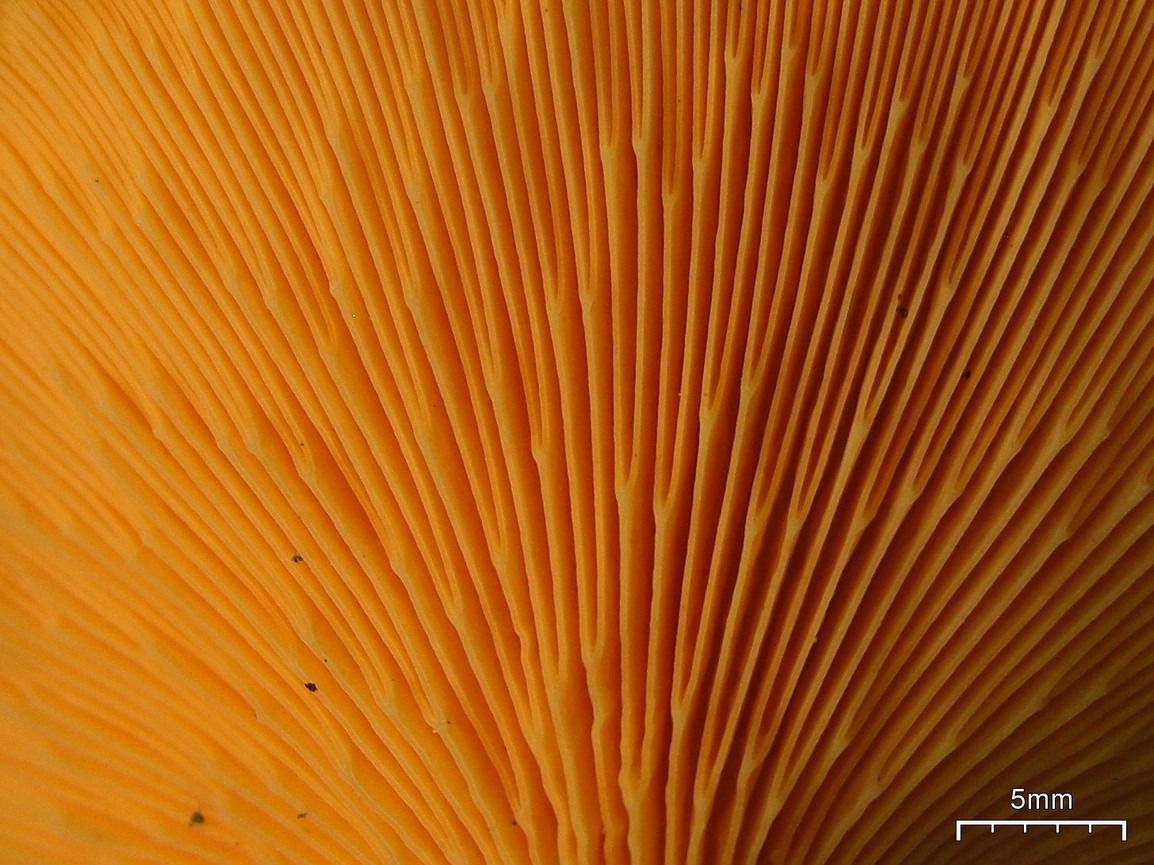
Closeup of the orange, forked gills of H. aurantiaca

Hygrophoropsis species have fruit bodies with concave caps that often have wavy margins and rolled-in edges. The texture of the cap surface ranges from somewhat tomentose to velvety. Typical fruit body colors are orange, brownish-yellow (fulvous) or paler, buff, and cream. The gills have a decurrent attachment to the stipe. They are narrow with blunt edges, often multiply forked, and readily detachable from the stipe. The flesh is soft and generally the same colour as the fruit body surface, or lighter. The taste and odour of the flesh is usually nondescript, or similar to cultivated mushrooms. In contrast, H. rufa can have a distinct ozone-like smell, reportedly reminiscent of the orchid Oncidium ornithorhynchum or a photocopier.

The spore print colour ranges from whitish to cream. Microscopically, Hygrophoropsis lacks cystidia and has spores that are dextrinoid, meaning that they stain reddish-brown in Melzer's reagent. Clamp connections are present in the hyphae. With respect to overall appearance, Hygrophoropsis species closely resemble those in genus Cantharellula; the latter genus, however, has amyloid rather than dextrinoid spores.

== Habitat, distribution, and ecology ==
Collectively, Hygrophoropsis is a widespread genus, found in both Northern and Southern Hemispheres. Hygrophoropsis aurantiaca is the most widely distributed species, found on several continents. The other species are not well-known and have more limited ranges. Fruit bodies grow on the ground in woodlands, on moss, and peat, and on woodchips. Hygrophoropsis is a saprophytic genus, and causes brown rot in the wood it colonises. Some species may be facultatively mycorrhizal.

Hygrophoropsis aurantiaca secretes large amounts of oxalic acid—a reducing agent and relatively strong acid—into the soil around its woody substrate. This chemical stimulates weathering of the humus layer of forest soil, as the organic matter in soil breaks down into smaller molecules. This influences the solubility and turnover of nutrients (particularly phosphorus and nitrogen), which in turn affects their availability for use by forest trees.

== Species ==
A 2008 estimate in the Dictionary of the Fungi placed five species in the genus. As of November 2015, Index Fungorum accepts 16 species in Hygrophoropsis:

Name	The binomial name of the Hygrophoropsis species.
Authority	The author citation—the person who first described the species using an available scientific name, eventually combined with the one who placed it in Hygrophoropsis, and using standardized abbreviations.
Year	The year in which the species was named, or transferred to the genus Hygrophoropsis.
Distribution	The distribution of the species.

Image	Name	Authority	Year	Distribution
	H. aurantiaca	(Wulfen) Maire	1921	Widespread
	H. bicolor	Hongo	1963	Japan
	H. coacta	McNabb	1969	New Zealand
	H. flabelliformis	(Berk. & Ravenel) Corner	1966	United States
	H. fuscosquamula	P.D.Orton	1960	Great Britain
	H. kivuensis	Heinem.	1963	Republic of Congo
	H. laevis	Heinem. & Rammeloo	1985	Malawi
	H. macrospora	(D.A.Reid) Kuyper	1996	Great Britain
	H. mangenotii	Locq.	1954	Ivory Coast
	H. ochraceolutea	Contu & Bon	1991	Sardinia
	H. panamensis	Singer	1983	Central America
	H. psammophila	(Cleland) Grgur.	1997	Australia
	H. purpurascens	(Berk. & M.A.Curtis) Dennis	1952	South America; Oceania
	H. rufa	(D.A.Reid) Knudsen	2008	Great Britain; Czech Republic
	H. rufescens	(Quél.) Singer	1986	Europe
	H. tapinia	Singer	1946	Costa Rica; United States

Hygrophorus pallidus, recorded by Charles Horton Peck in 1902, is considered by mycologist Thomas Kuyper to be not validly published and "better regarded as a nomen confusum", a taxonomic opinion corroborated by Geoffrey Kibby. Now considered the type species for the genus Aphroditeola, A. olida was formerly classified in Hygrophoropsis, but it lacks dextrinoid basidiospores, and phylogenetically it is classified in the Agaricales. Other species formerly placed in Hygrophoropsis but since transferred to other genera include: H. stevensonii (Berk. & Broome) Corner 1966 (now Gerronema stevensonii); H. albida (Fr.) Maire 1933 (now Gerronema albidum); H. umbonata (J.F.Gmel.) Kühner & Romagn. 1953 (now Cantharellula umbonata); and H. umbriceps (Cooke) McNabb 1969 (now Cantharellus umbriceps).
