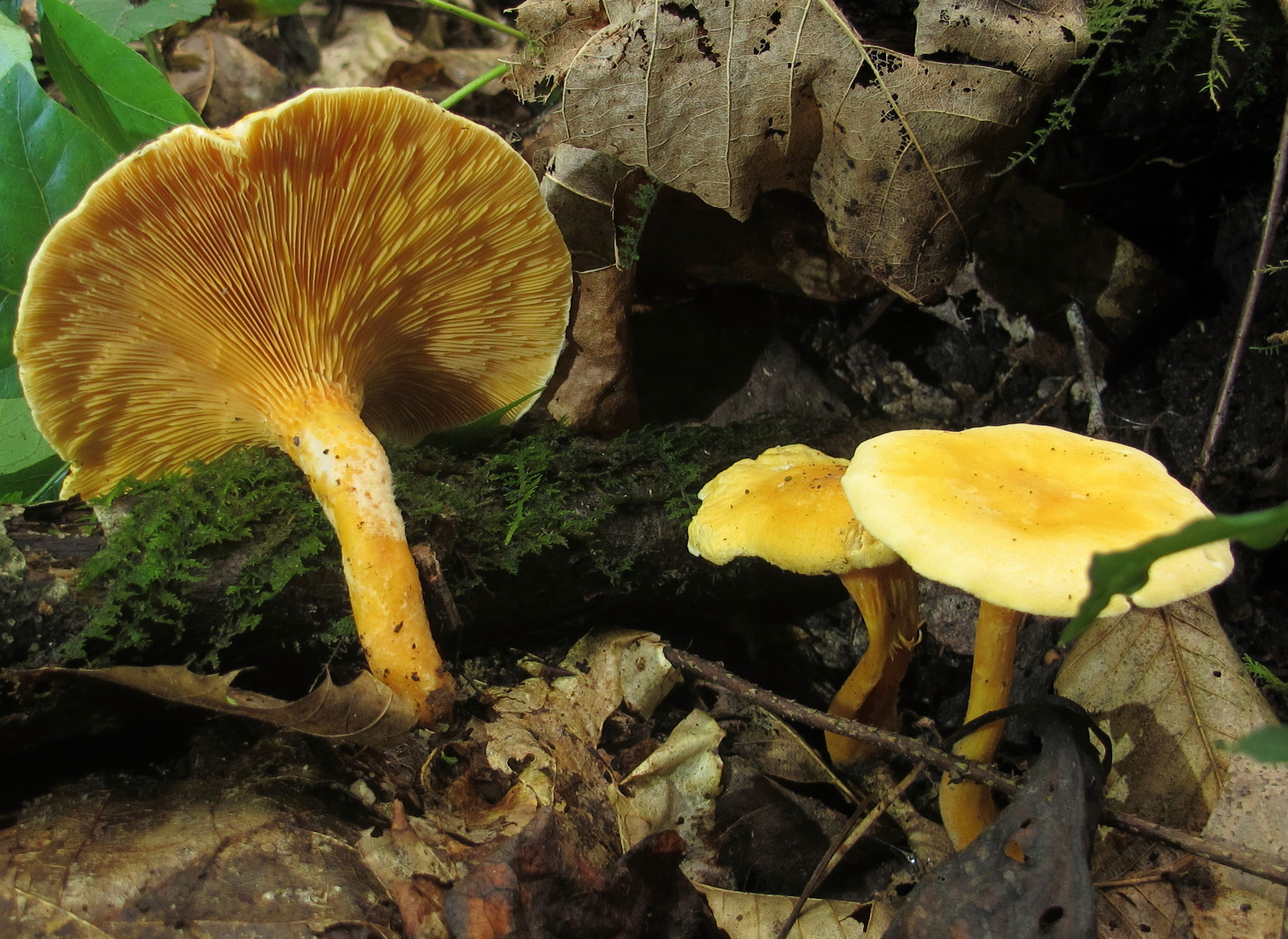

Scientific classification
- Kingdom: Fungi
- Division: Basidiomycota
- Class: Agaricomycetes
- Order: Boletales
- Family: Hygrophoropsidaceae
- Genus: Hygrophoropsis
- Species: H. aurantiaca

Binomial name
- Hygrophoropsis aurantiaca (Wulfen) Maire (1921)

Synonyms
- Agaricus aurantiacus Wulfen (1781); Merulius aurantiacus (Wulfen) J.F.Gmel. (1792); Cantharellus aurantiacus Krombh. (1841); Clitocybe aurantiaca (Wulfen) Stud.-Steinh. (1900)

= Hygrophoropsis aurantiaca =

False chanterelle

Species of fungus in the family Hygrophoropsidaceae

Hygrophoropsis aurantiaca
- Mycological characteristics
- Gills on hymenium
- Cap is depressed or infundibuliform
- Hymenium is decurrent
- Stipe is bare
- Spore print is white to cream
- Ecology is saprotrophic
- Edibility is not recommended or poisonous

Hygrophoropsis aurantiaca, commonly known as the false chanterelle, is a species of fungus in the family Hygrophoropsidaceae.

Austrian naturalist Franz Xaver von Wulfen described the false chanterelle in 1781, noting both its resemblance with the true chanterelles and people's propensity to confuse them. The false chanterelle was then placed in the genus Clitocybe, but it was later observed that its forked gills and dextrinoid spores indicated a relationship to Paxillus. Genetic analysis has confirmed that it belongs to the order Boletales and is more closely related to boletes.

The fruit bodies (mushrooms) are yellow–orange, with a funnel-shaped cap up to 8 cm (3 in) across that has a felt-like surface. The thin, often forked gills on the underside of the cap run partway down the length of the otherwise smooth stipe. The species is found across several continents, growing in woodland and heathland, and sometimes on woodchips used in gardening and landscaping. Reports on the mushroom's edibility vary; it is considered poisonous, but has historically been eaten in parts of Europe and the Americas.

== Taxonomy ==
Austrian naturalist Franz Xaver von Wulfen described the false chanterelle as Agaricus aurantiacus in 1781, reporting that it appeared in the fir tree forests around Klagenfurt in October. He added that it could be confused with the chanterelle by the inexperienced, but that its true nature was very different; in contrast to its edible lookalike, he described it as "kind of pernicious". The specific epithet is the Latin word aurantiacus, meaning "orange". James Sowerby illustrated it and gave it the name Agaricus subcantharellus, describing it as a "perhaps unfavourable" variety of A. cantharellus (chanterelle). The fungus was placed in the genus Merulius by Johann Friedrich Gmelin in 1792, and then Cantharellus by Elias Fries in 1821. Bernhard Studer-Steinhäuslin concluded it could only be classified in the genus Clitocybe in 1900, based on its white spores, decurrent gills and lack of a ring. It was elevated to the status of genus in a 1929 publication by Emile Martin-Sans, with authorship attributed to René Maire. Martin-Sans concurred with Maire's assessment of Hygrophoropsis, suggesting that it represented a form intermediate between Cantharellus and Clitocybe, and was thus worthy of generic ranking. The genus name refers to a resemblance to the genus Hygrophorus. It is commonly known as the false chanterelle.

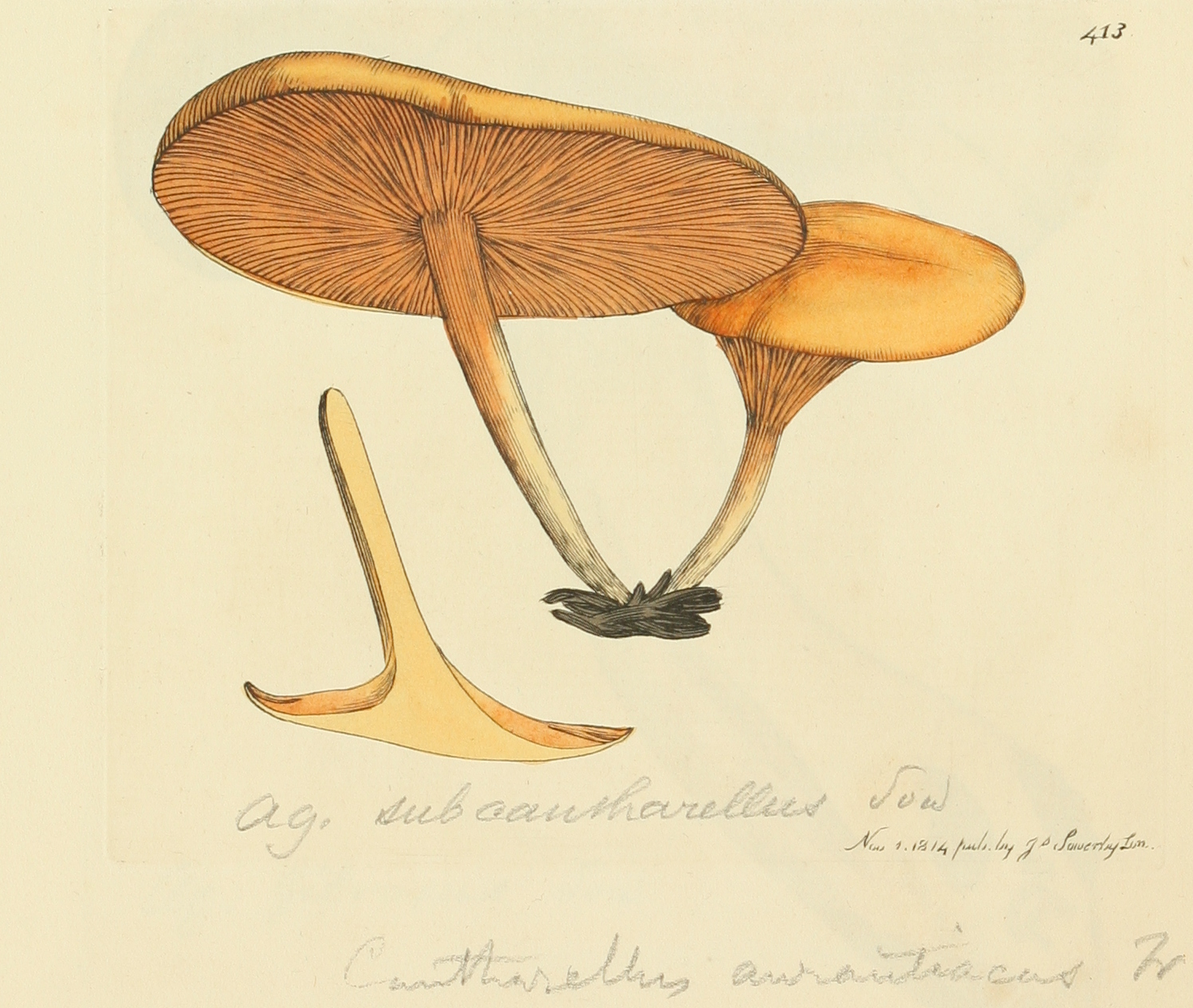
James Sowerby's 1809 illustration of Agaricus subcantharellus

Two varieties described by Derek Reid in 1972, H. aurantiaca var. macrospora and H. aurantiaca var. rufa, have since been promoted to distinct species status as H. macrospora (1996) and H. rufa (2008). Two other varieties of the fungus have been described, but they are not considered to have independent taxonomic significance by Index Fungorum: var. nana (Singer 1946), characterized by a small fruit body; and var. robusta (Antonín 2000), characterized by a robust fruit body and an odour similar to Maggi seasoning sauce. Pale forms of the fungus are sometimes referred to as var. pallida. This taxon was first published by Robert Kühner and Henri Romagnesi in 1953, but later considered invalid as it did not conform to nomenclatural rules. Variety nigripes, a taxon with a black-brown stipe, is invalid for similar reasons. H. aurantiaca var. pallida was published validly in 1995.

In 1979, Egon Horak suggested that H. aurantiaca and the New Zealand taxon H. coacta were the same species, but neither Index Fungorum nor MycoBank accept this synonymy. According to MycoBank, H. aurantiaca has several heterotypic synonyms, i.e. different types but considered the same species:

- Agaricus alectorolophoides Schaeff. (1774)
- Agaricus subcantharellus Sowerby (1809)
- Cantharellus brachypodus Chevall. (1826)
- Cantharellus ravenelii Berk. & M.A.Curtis (1853)
- Merulius brachypodes (Chevall.) Kuntze (1891)

Hygrophoropsis aurantiaca has been confused with the true chanterelles (genus Cantharellus) because of overall similarities in appearance. However, the forked gills, frequently off-centre stipe placement, and dextrinoid spores of H. aurantiaca suggested a relationship with Paxillus, prompting Rolf Singer to classify the genus Hygrophoropsis in the family Paxillaceae in 1946. Several pigments have been identified from the fungus, including the orange variegatic acid, methyl variegate, the red variegatorubin, and several derivatives of pulvinic acid. The presence of these pigments suggests a chemotaxic relationship with the Boletaceae, Coniophoraceae, and Paxillaceae – families of Boletales with members that have similar compounds. Molecular phylogenetic analysis confirmed its affinity lay in the order Boletales in 1997, though later research showed it is not closely related to Paxillus or other gilled members of the order.

== Description ==
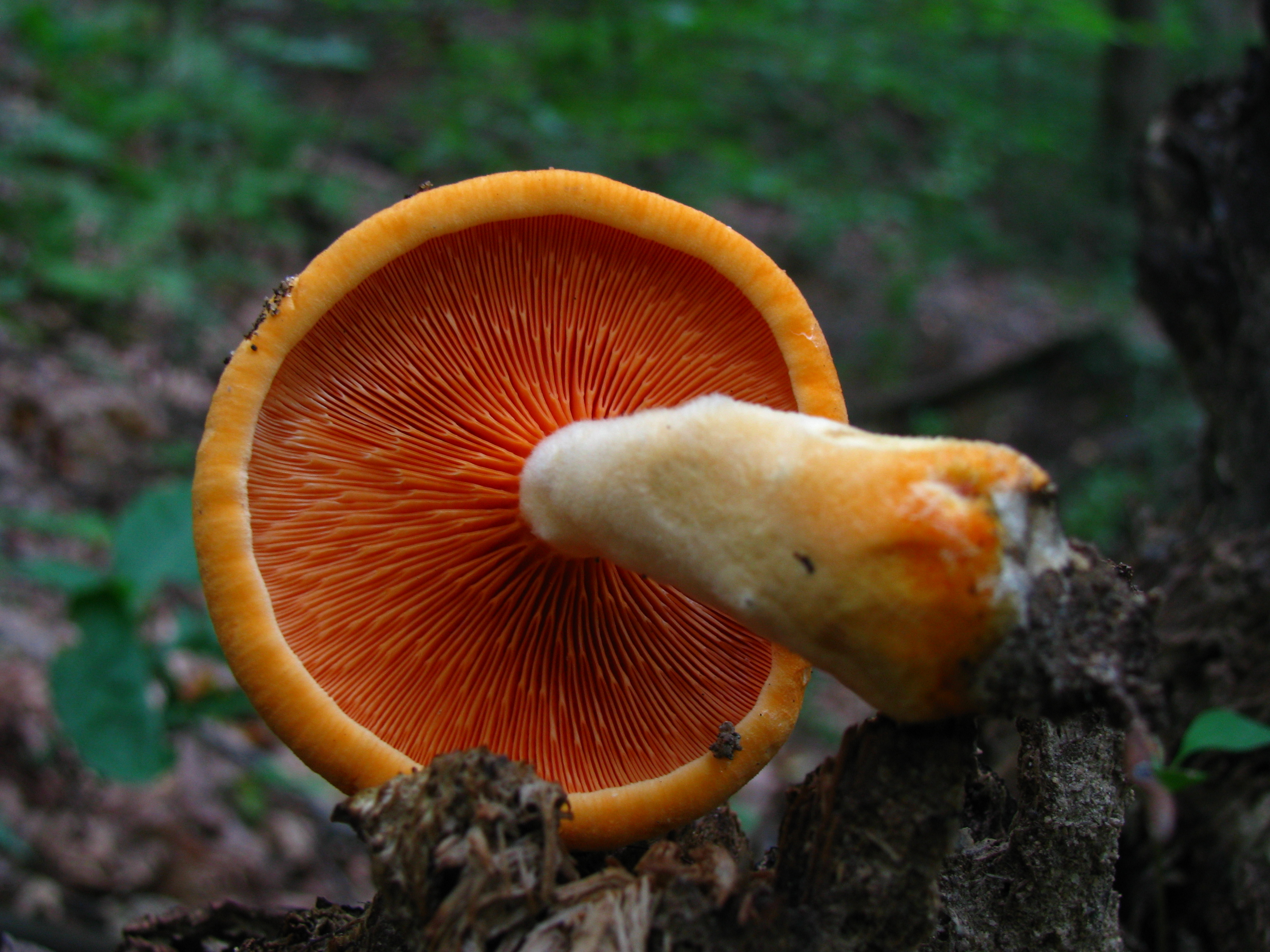
Cap underside with orange, forked gills and inrolled rim

The species has a golden-orange cap ranging from 2–10 cm (3/4–4 in) in diameter, initially convex but becoming funnel-shaped as the mushroom matures. The cap margin, which remains rolled in a little, becomes wavy or lobed in age. The cap surface is covered with a fine down. The decurrent gill-like structures are narrow and forked, which is a distinctive and distinguishing feature. They are generally a more intense shade of orange than the cap. Along the stipe, the gills may be slightly crimped. The orange stipe is 1.5–8 cm (5/8–3 1/8 in) tall and 0.5–1 cm (1/4–3/8 in) thick, and lacks a ring. It often has a darker, brownish, base. The ability to form sclerotia (compact masses of hardened fungal mycelium) has been documented for H. aurantiaca in laboratory studies. These structures contain glycogen and protein that may be used as food reserves during spore germination.

The soft, thin flesh ranges from white to yellowish to golden-orange. It has an odour and taste described variously as indistinct, or unpleasant and earthy. The spore print is white to cream. The oval spores are 5.5–7 by 4–4.5 micrometres (μm), with walls that tend to thicken in age. The spores are cyanophilous, meaning they will readily stain dark blue in methyl blue solution. Staining with Melzer's reagent often produces a dextrinoid (reddish-brown) colour reaction. Basidia (spore-bearing cells) measure 25–40 by 5–8 μm, and can be two-, three-, or four-spored. Cystidia (large sterile cells on the hymenium) are absent. The cap cuticle is in the form of a trichoderm, where the outermost hyphae are roughly parallel, like hairs, perpendicular to the cap surface. These hyphae are 4–15 μm in diameter, and contain intracellular pigments that impart an orange-brown to yellow-brown colouring to the cells. Clamp connections are present in the hyphae.

Teratological (developmentally abnormal) forms of H. aurantiaca have been reported to occur in the United Kingdom. The fruit bodies of these specimens were club-shaped with a wrinkled upper surface of convoluted gill tissue. The overall morphology of these forms somewhat resembles species of Clavariadelphus. Although the cause of this abnormal development is not known with certainty, environmental pollutants or virus infection have been suggested as contributing factors.

=== Similar species ===
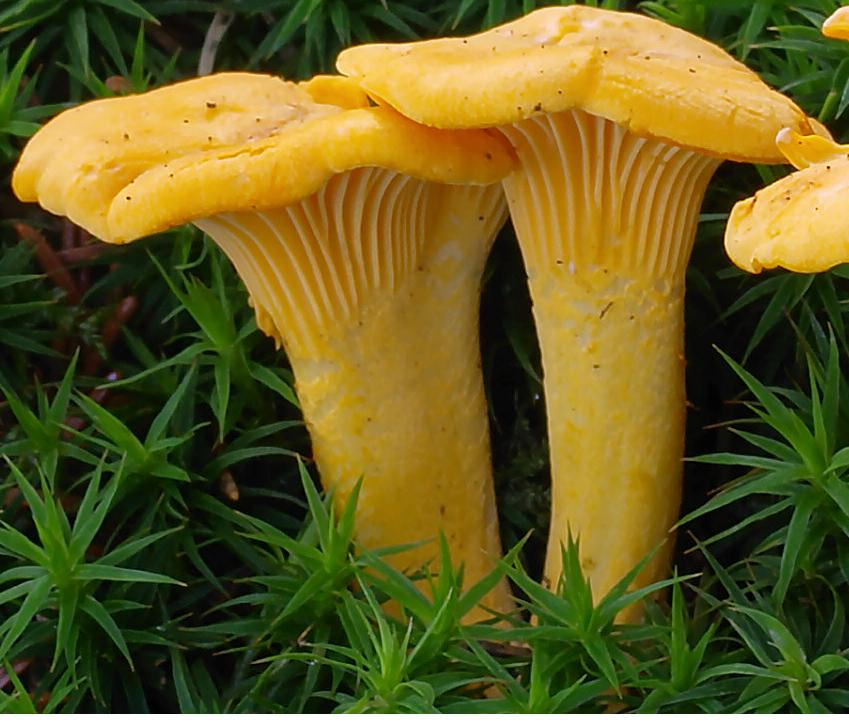
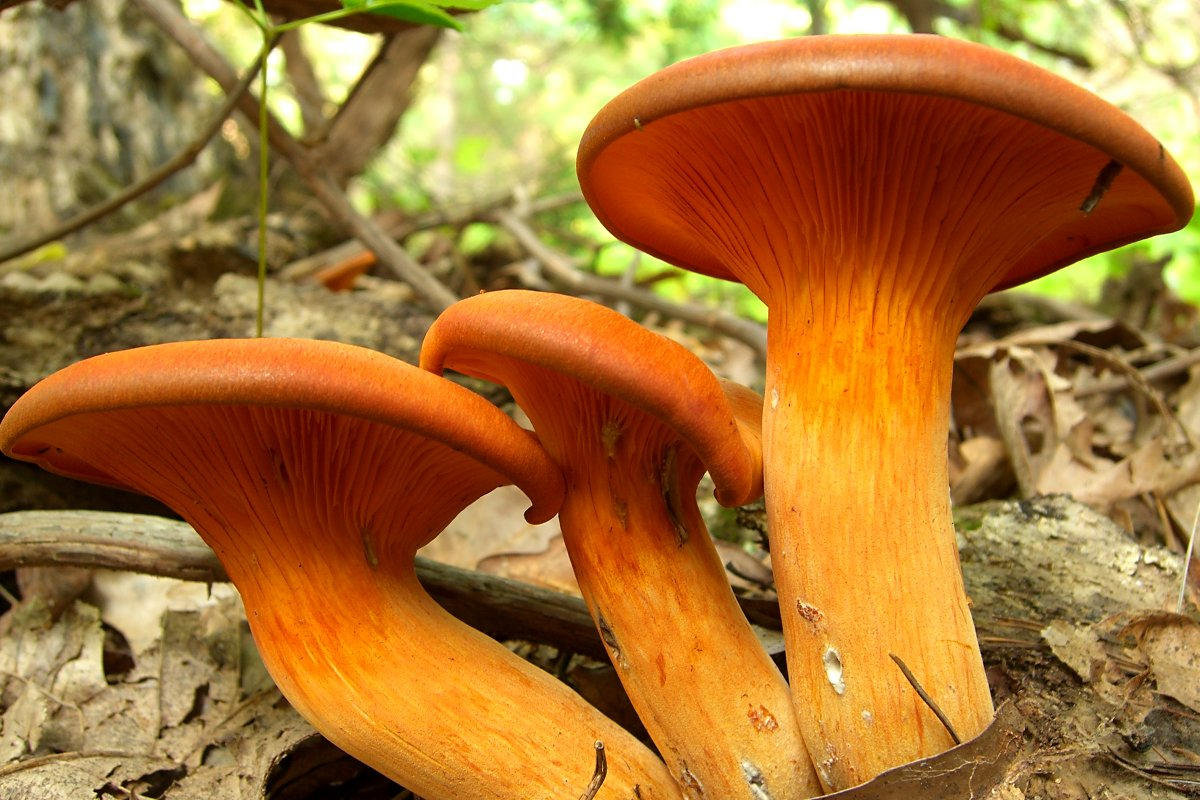
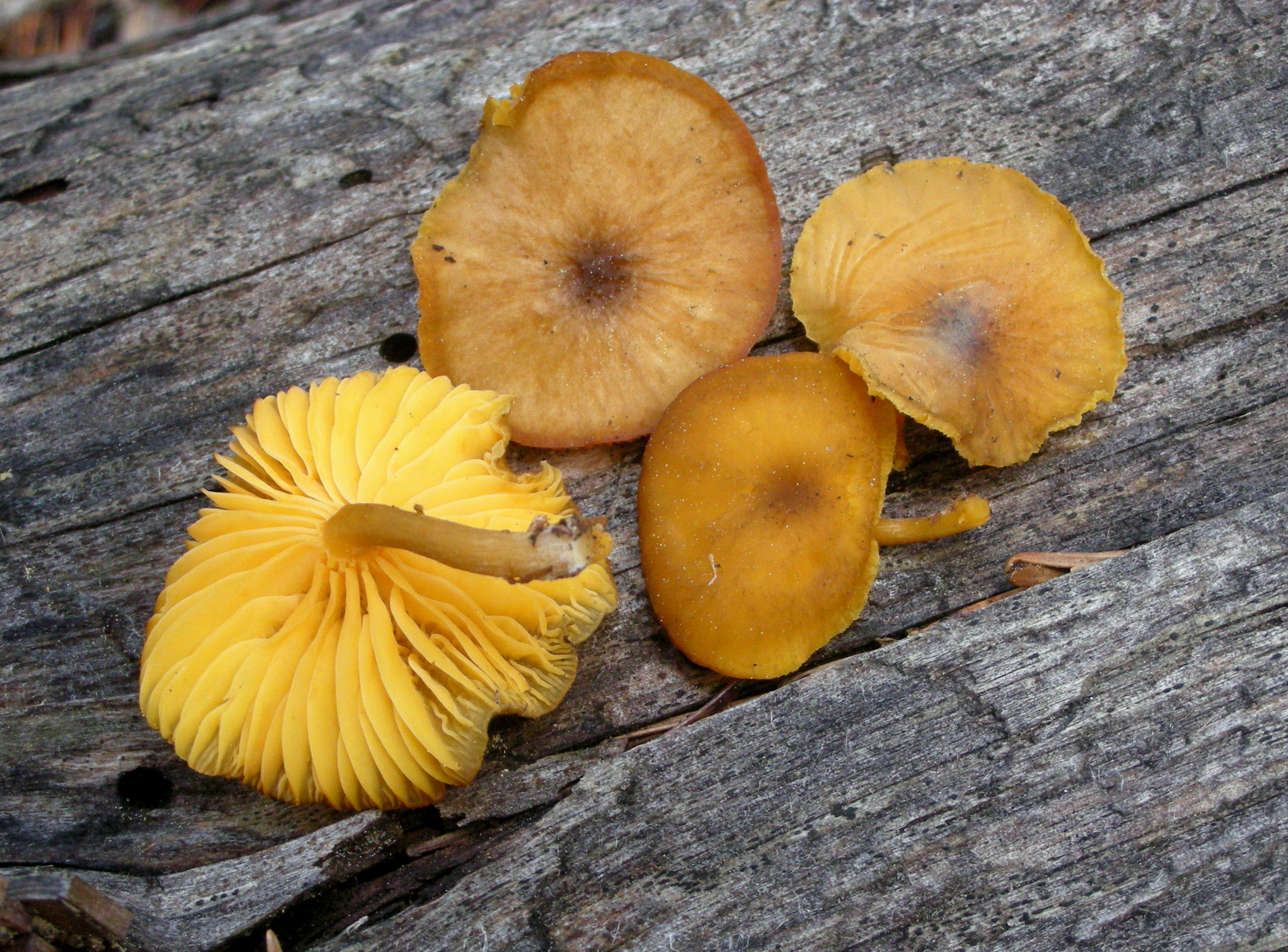
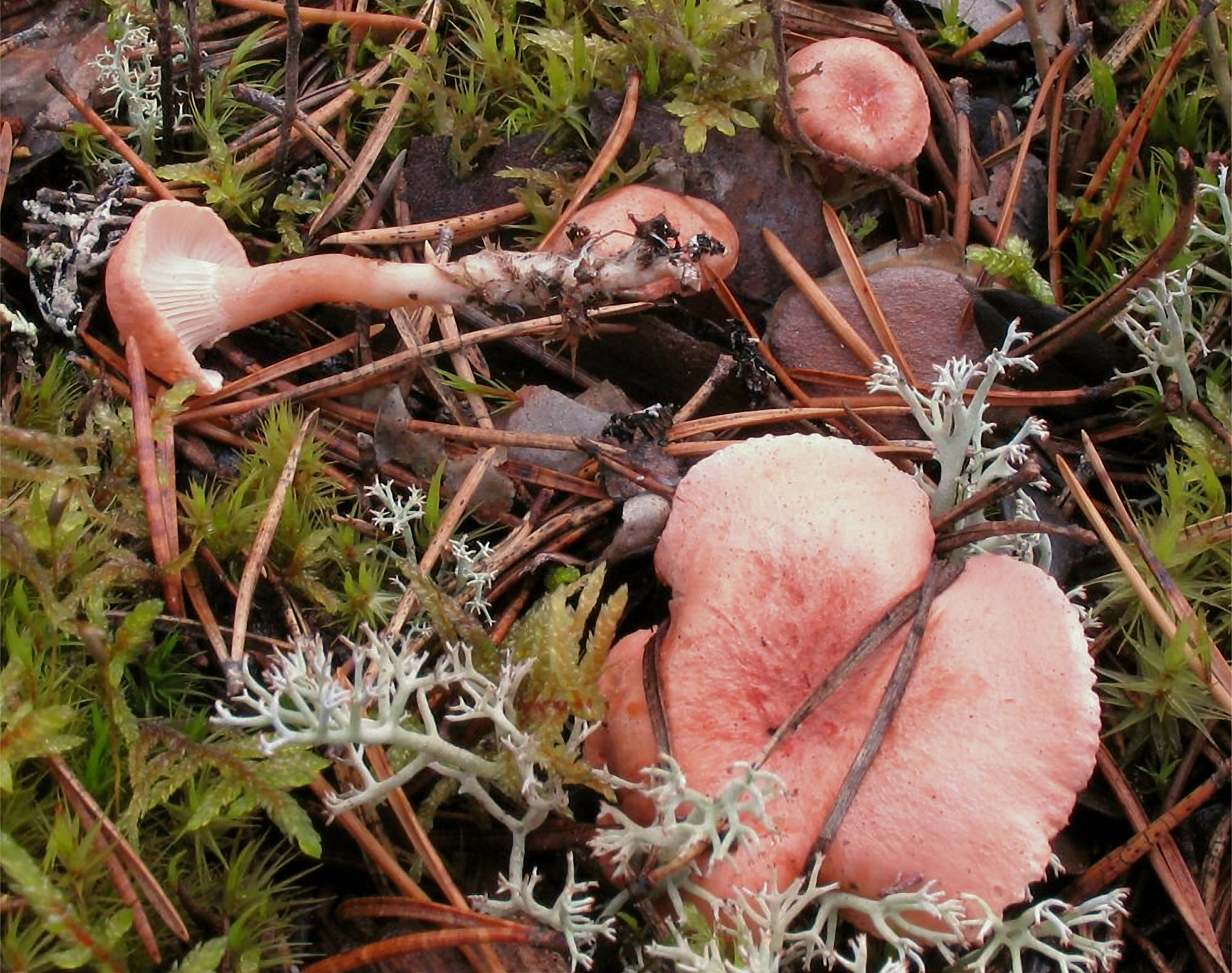
Lookalike species. Clockwise from upper left: Cantharellus cibarius, Omphalotus illudens, Aphroditeola olida, Chrysomphalina chrysophylla.

Characteristics typically used in the field to distinguish Hygrophoropsis aurantiaca from lookalike species include: the soft, dry consistency of its cap; the crowded, decurrent, and forked gills that are saffron to orange coloured; and the lack of any distinctive taste or odour. The false chanterelle can be distinguished from the true chanterelle (Cantharellus cibarius) by its deeper orange colour, brown base to the stipe, velvety cap surface, forked gills rather than gill-like ridges, softer (and thinner) flesh, and lack of the characteristic apricot-smell. The cap surface of Hygrophoropsis fuscosquamula, found in Britain, has fine brown scales overlaying a dull orange background. H. rufa has velvety brown fur covering its cap, while H. macrospora has cream gills and stipe. Microscopically, these three species have larger spores than H. aurantiaca. H. tapinia, found in a range extending from southern Florida to Central America, is set apart from H. aurantiaca by its growth on or under deciduous trees (never conifers), and smaller spores, which measure 3.3–4.8 by 2.5–3.3 μm.

Formerly a member of Hygrophoropsis, Aphroditeola olida is also similar in appearance to H. aurantiaca but can be distinguished from the false chanterelle by its smaller, pinkish fruit bodies and candy-like odour. It also has smaller spores. Chrysomphalina chrysophylla has a yellowish brown cap and unforked yellow gills. Cortinarius hesleri, an eastern North American species that associates with oaks, has a rusty brown spore print and a cortina in young specimens. The poisonous jack-o'-lantern mushrooms (genus Omphalotus) comprise another group of lookalikes; however, they have straight, non-forked true gills. The European wood-rotting species Haasiella splendidissima, (Note: This taxon is given in the original source as Haasiella venustissima; molecular analysis published in 2012 indicates that this is the same species as H. splendidissima.) sometimes confused with H. aurantiaca, is most readily distinguished from the latter by its pink spore print and gills that do not fork. Additionally, species of Infundibulicybe and Paralepista have unforked cream-to-tan gills.

== Distribution and habitat ==
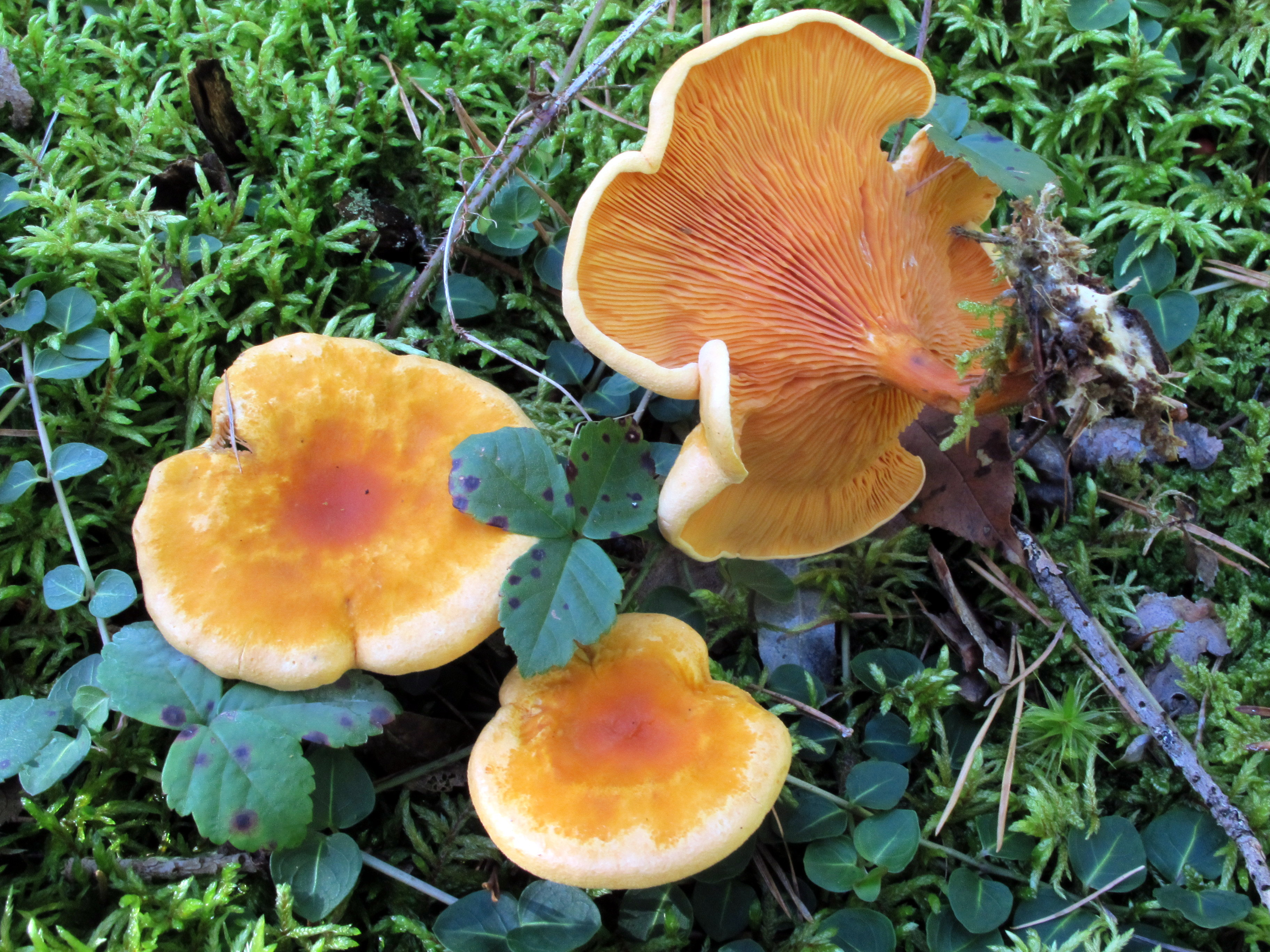
Specimens in Pennsylvania

Hygrophoropsis aurantiaca is a widely distributed species. In Europe and North America, it is found in both hardwood and conifer forests, as well as heathland, in summer and autumn. In North America, it can be found from July–October to the east and September–January on the West Coast. It can be found in Central and South America, and Mexico, where it is common in coniferous forests. It has also been recorded in northern Asia, Australia and New Zealand. Populations in California represent a complex of undescribed species that are collectively referred to as Hygrophoropsis aurantiaca sensu lato.

It fruits from the ground or from decaying wood, on burned areas in forests, and is often found near fallen trees and tree stumps. The fungus can also grow on woodchips used in gardening and landscaping, and so it also appears on roadsides and other locations where this material is used. Fruit bodies occur singly to scattered, or in clusters, and can be very abundant. Generally considered a dry weather mushroom, it can be plentiful when other mushrooms are scarce.

== Ecology ==
A saprophytic fungus, H. aurantiaca obtains nutrients from forest litter and decomposing wood, causing a brown rot on the wood upon which it grows.

H. aurantiaca secretes large amounts of oxalic acid, a reducing agent and relatively strong acid. This stimulates weathering of the humus layer of forest soil, and influences the solubility and turnover of nutrients (particularly phosphorus and nitrogen), which in turn affects their availability for use by forest trees.

== Edibility ==
The false chanterelle is considered poisonous and may cause serious digestive problems. Among other toxins, it contains high levels of the sugar alcohol arabitol. The mushroom was sometimes described as edible (though not tasty) until 1999. Fries described it as venenatus, meaning "poisonous", in 1821. Considering the species potentially edible, David Arora speculated that it may have been confused with similar-looking but definitely poisonous species of Omphalotus. Italian mycologist Nicola Sitta has reported that the one attributed case of poisoning he knew of could be attributed to an idiosyncratic reaction as only one of three people eating it got symptoms and concludes that it is harmless. It is eaten in Spain and France, and can legally be sold in France and Belgium. It is not recommended in Italy due to its similarity to poisonous species. It is eaten, though not highly regarded, by the Zapotec people of Ixtlán de Juárez in Oaxaca. The Tepehuán people of northwestern Mexico also occasionally eat the mushroom, which they refer to in their native language as guin'xacan ("delightful") or kia's gio' ("iguana lard"); there, it is commonly prepared by roasting over charcoal, or boiling and garnishing with cheese.
