= Hygrophoropsis purpurascens =

Scientific classification
- Domain: Eukaryota
- Kingdom: Fungi
- Division: Basidiomycota
- Class: Agaricomycetes
- Order: Boletales
- Family: Hygrophoropsidaceae
- Genus: Hygrophoropsis
- Species: H. purpurascens

Binomial name
- Hygrophoropsis purpurascens (Berk. & M.A.Curtis) Dennis (1952)

Synonyms
- Marasmius purpurascens Berk. & M.A.Curtis (1868); Chamaeceras purpurascens (Berk. & M.A.Curtis) Kuntze (1898)

Species of fungus

Hygrophoropsis purpurascens is a species of fungus in the family Hygrophoropsidaceae. Originally described by Miles Joseph Berkeley and Moses Ashley Curtis in 1869 as Marasmius purpurascens, it was transferred to the genus Hygrophoropsis by Richard Dennis in 1952. It has been collected from Trinidad, Venezuela, Jamaica, and Cuba, where it grows on rotting logs in forests.
