= Hygrophoropsis flabelliformis =

Scientific classification
- Domain: Eukaryota
- Kingdom: Fungi
- Division: Basidiomycota
- Class: Agaricomycetes
- Order: Boletales
- Family: Hygrophoropsidaceae
- Genus: Hygrophoropsis
- Species: H. flabelliformis

Binomial name
- Hygrophoropsis flabelliformis (Berk. & Ravenel) Corner (1966)

Synonyms
- Cantharellus flabelliformis Berk. & Ravenel (1853); Merulius flabelliformis (Berk. & Ravenel) Kuntze (1891); Plicatura flabelliformis (Berk. & Ravenel) Murrill (1910)

Species of fungus

Hygrophoropsis flabelliformis is a species of fungus in the family Hygrophoropsidaceae. It was first described by mycologists Miles Joseph Berkeley and Henry William Ravenel in 1853 as Cantharellus flabelliformis. E.J.H. Corner transferred it to the genus Hygrophoropsis in 1966.
