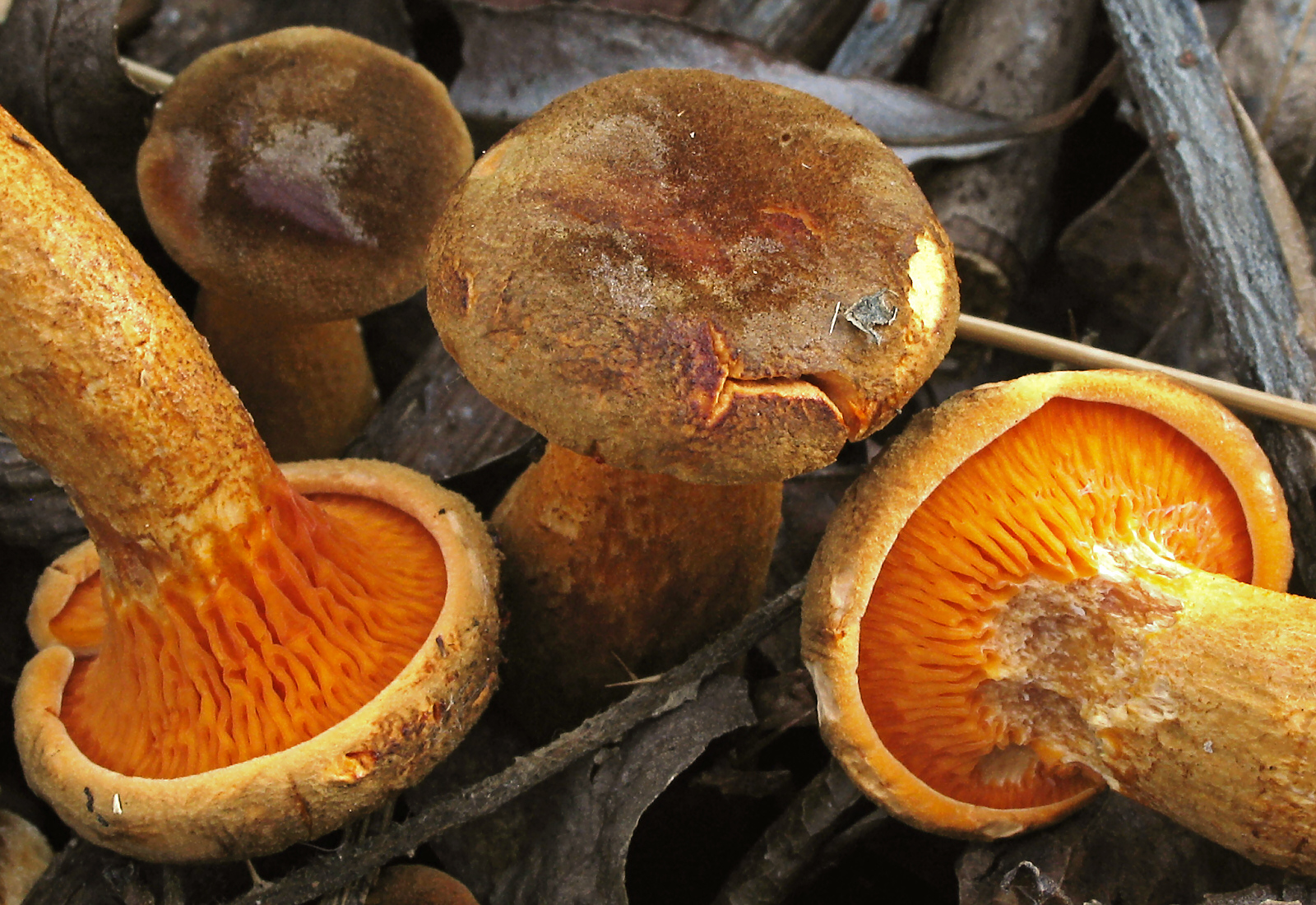

Scientific classification
- Domain: Eukaryota
- Kingdom: Fungi
- Division: Basidiomycota
- Class: Agaricomycetes
- Order: Boletales
- Family: Hygrophoropsidaceae
- Genus: Hygrophoropsis
- Species: H. rufa

Binomial name
- Hygrophoropsis rufa (D.A.Reid) Knudsen (2008)

Synonyms
- Hygrophoropsis aurantiaca var. rufa D.A.Reid (1972)

= Hygrophoropsis rufa =

Species of fungus

Hygrophoropsis rufa is a species of fungus in the family Hygrophoropsidaceae. It is found in Europe, where it grows on woodchips or near conifer stumps.

== Taxonomy ==
Originally described by Derek Reid in 1972 as a variety of Hygrophoropsis aurantiaca, it was raised to distinct species status in 2008. Molecular analysis of DNA sequences confirms its genetic uniqueness, and its status as sister species to H. aurantiaca.

== Description ==
The fruit body has an orange- to dark brown cap, which is up to 10 cm (4 in) across. The stipe, flesh and decurrent gills are all orange. The gills are forked. Hygrophoropsis rufa can have a penetrating ozone-like smell, reportedly reminiscent of an orchid species Oncidium ornithorhynchum or a photocopier.

Spores of H. rufa are thick-walled and have an ellipsoid shape, and measure 5.6–6.4 by 3.6–4.4 micrometres (μm). They have a strongly dextrinoid staining reaction with Melzer's reagent (resulting in a reddish-brown colour), although not all spores will react. Microscopically, the cells of the cap cuticle are arranged in the form of a trichoderm, where the outermost hyphae emerge roughly parallel, like hairs, perpendicular to the cap surface. These hyphae are of three types: broad, thick-walled and hyaline (translucent); filiform (threadlike); or with granular golden-brown contents. In contrast, the cap cuticle of H. aurantiaca is arranged as a uniformly tangled cutis (with hyphae parallel to the pileus surface).

== Habitat and distribution ==
A rare species, H. rufa has been recorded in the United Kingdom, Austria, Germany, and Denmark, although unconfirmed internet photos suggest a wider range that includes France and Slovakia. A saprophytic fungus, it fruits on woodchips or near conifer stumps.
