= Hygrophoropsis psammophila =

Scientific classification
- Domain: Eukaryota
- Kingdom: Fungi
- Division: Basidiomycota
- Class: Agaricomycetes
- Order: Boletales
- Family: Hygrophoropsidaceae
- Genus: Hygrophoropsis
- Species: H. psammophila

Binomial name
- Hygrophoropsis psammophila (Cleland) Grgur. (1997)

Synonyms
- Paxillus psammophilus Cleland (1933)

Species of fungus

Hygrophoropsis psammophila is a species of fungus in the family Hygrophoropsidaceae. Originally described by John Burton Cleland in 1933 as Paxillus psammophilus, it was transferred to the genus Hygrophoropsis by Cheryl Grgurinovic in 1997. It is found in Australia, where it grows in groups in sand.
