= Hygrophoropsis laevis =

Scientific classification
- Domain: Eukaryota
- Kingdom: Fungi
- Division: Basidiomycota
- Class: Agaricomycetes
- Order: Boletales
- Family: Hygrophoropsidaceae
- Genus: Hygrophoropsis
- Species: H. laevis

Binomial name
- Hygrophoropsis laevis Heinem. & Rammeloo (1985)

Species of fungus

Hygrophoropsis laevis is a species of fungus in the family Hygrophoropsidaceae. Found in Malawi, it was described as new to science in 1985.
