= Hygrophoropsis bicolor =

Scientific classification
- Domain: Eukaryota
- Kingdom: Fungi
- Division: Basidiomycota
- Class: Agaricomycetes
- Order: Boletales
- Family: Hygrophoropsidaceae
- Genus: Hygrophoropsis
- Species: H. bicolor

Binomial name
- Hygrophoropsis bicolor Hongo (1963)

Species of fungus

Hygrophoropsis bicolor is a species of fungus in the family Hygrophoropsidaceae. Found in Japan, it was described as new to science in 1963 by Tsuguo Hongo.
