= Hygrophoropsis panamensis =

Scientific classification
- Domain: Eukaryota
- Kingdom: Fungi
- Division: Basidiomycota
- Class: Agaricomycetes
- Order: Boletales
- Family: Hygrophoropsidaceae
- Genus: Hygrophoropsis
- Species: H. panamensis

Binomial name
- Hygrophoropsis panamensis Singer (1983)

Species of fungus

Hygrophoropsis panamensis is a species of fungus in the family Hygrophoropsidaceae. Found in Panama, it was described as new to science in 1983 by mycologist Rolf Singer.
