= Hygrophoropsis rufescens =

Scientific classification
- Kingdom: Fungi
- Division: Basidiomycota
- Class: Agaricomycetes
- Order: Boletales
- Family: Hygrophoropsidaceae
- Genus: Hygrophoropsis
- Species: H. rufescens

Binomial name
- Hygrophoropsis rufescens (Quél.) Singer (1986)

Synonyms
- Cantharellus rufescens Quél. (1886); Merulius rufescens (Fr.) Kuntze (1891)

Species of fungus

Hygrophoropsis rufescens is a species of fungus in the family Hygrophoropsidaceae. Originally described as Cantharellus rufescens by French mycologist Lucien Quélet in 1886, it was transferred to Hygrophoropsis by Rolf Singer in 1986.
