= Hygrophoropsis coacta =

Scientific classification
- Domain: Eukaryota
- Kingdom: Fungi
- Division: Basidiomycota
- Class: Agaricomycetes
- Order: Boletales
- Family: Hygrophoropsidaceae
- Genus: Hygrophoropsis
- Species: H. coacta

Binomial name
- Hygrophoropsis coacta McNabb (1969)

Species of fungus

Hygrophoropsis coacta is a species of fungus in the family Hygrophoropsidaceae. Described as new to science in 1969 by Robert Francis Ross McNabb, it is found in New Zealand.
