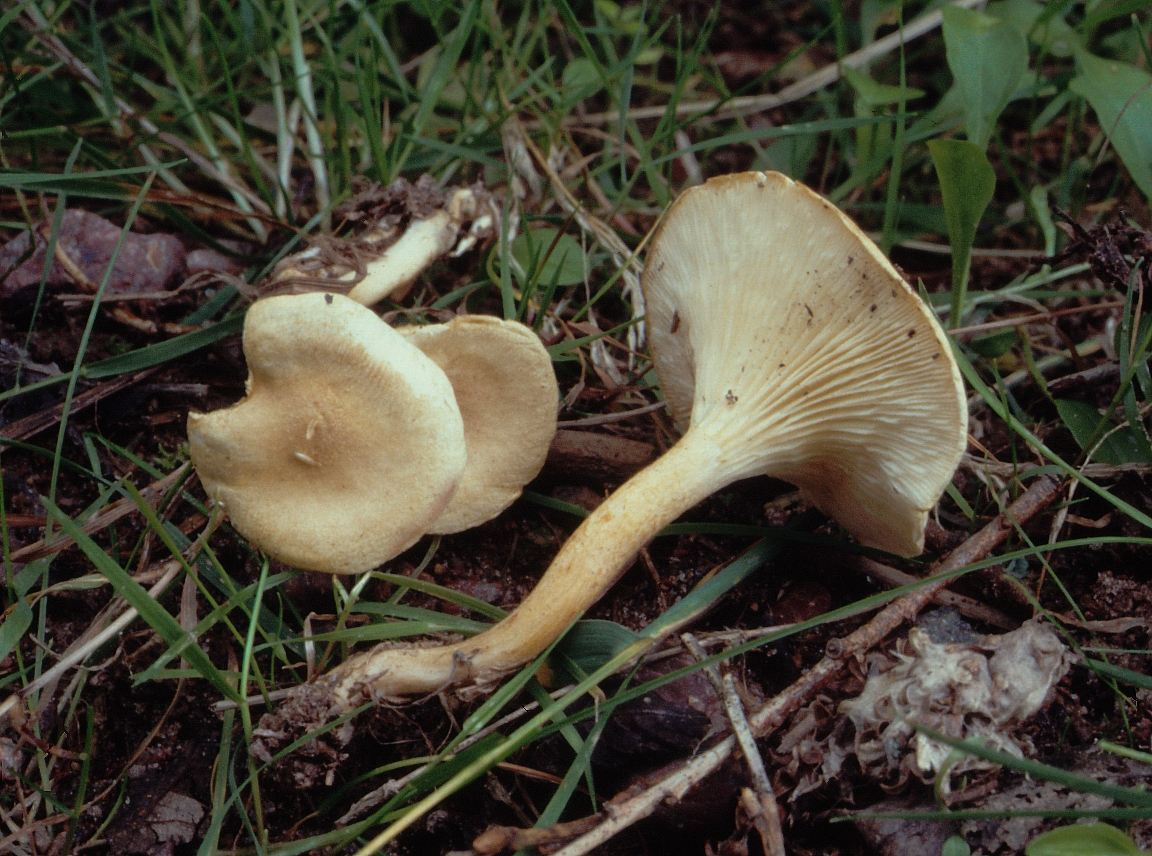

Scientific classification
- Domain: Eukaryota
- Kingdom: Fungi
- Division: Basidiomycota
- Class: Agaricomycetes
- Order: Boletales
- Family: Hygrophoropsidaceae
- Genus: Hygrophoropsis
- Species: H. macrospora

Binomial name
- Hygrophoropsis macrospora (D.A.Reid) Kuyper (1996)

Synonyms
- Hygrophoropsis aurantiaca var. macrospora D.A.Reid (1972)

= Hygrophoropsis macrospora =

Species of fungus

Hygrophoropsis macrospora Mycological characteristics
- Gills on hymenium
- Hymenium is decurrent

Hygrophoropsis macrospora is a species of fungus in the family Hygrophoropsidaceae. It is found in Europe and North America.

== Taxonomy ==
Formally described by Derek Reid in 1972 as a variety of Hygrophoropsis aurantiaca, it was raised to distinct species status by Thomas Kuyper in 1996. Hygrophoropsis pallida (Peck) Kreisel is a synonym that was never formally published. It is based on Charles Horton Peck's taxon Cantharellus aurantiatus var. pallidus, which he published in 1896.

== Description ==
Fruit bodies of Hygrophoropsis macrospora have a cream- to tan-coloured cap with a felt-like surface texture. The gills are forked and yellowish, with a decurrent attachment to the stipe.

Hygrophoropsis macrospora differs from H. aurantiaca mainly by its larger spore size, measuring 8.0–11.0 (sometimes up to 13.0) by 3.0–4.5 (5.0) μm. In comparison, the spores of H. aurantiaca have a shorter length, usually 5–8 μm, and a similar width.
