= Hygrophoropsis kivuensis =

Scientific classification
- Domain: Eukaryota
- Kingdom: Fungi
- Division: Basidiomycota
- Class: Agaricomycetes
- Order: Boletales
- Family: Hygrophoropsidaceae
- Genus: Hygrophoropsis
- Species: H. kivuensis

Binomial name
- Hygrophoropsis kivuensis Heinem. (1963)

Species of fungus

Hygrophoropsis kivuensis is a species of fungus in the family Hygrophoropsidaceae. Found in the Republic of Congo, it was described as new to science in 1963 by Belgian botanist Paul Heinemann.
