= Hygrophoropsis mangenotii =

Scientific classification
- Domain: Eukaryota
- Kingdom: Fungi
- Division: Basidiomycota
- Class: Agaricomycetes
- Order: Boletales
- Family: Hygrophoropsidaceae
- Genus: Hygrophoropsis
- Species: H. mangenotii

Binomial name
- Hygrophoropsis mangenotii Locq. (1954)

Species of fungus

Hygrophoropsis mangenotii is an edible gilled mushroom of the genus Hygrophoropsis native to the Ivory Coast. It was described in 1954 by Marcel Locquin.
