= Hygrophoropsis ochraceolutea =

Scientific classification
- Domain: Eukaryota
- Kingdom: Fungi
- Division: Basidiomycota
- Class: Agaricomycetes
- Order: Boletales
- Family: Hygrophoropsidaceae
- Genus: Hygrophoropsis
- Species: H. ochraceolutea

Binomial name
- Hygrophoropsis ochraceolutea Contu & Bon (1991)

Species of mushroom-forming fungus

Hygrophoropsis ochraceolutea is a species of mushroom-forming fungus in the family Hygrophoropsidaceae. It was described in 1991 from collections made in Sardinia, Italy, and is known to fruit in autumn under poplar trees in damp places.

== Taxonomy ==
Hygrophoropsis ochraceolutea was first formally described by the mycologists Marco Contu and Marcel Bon in March 1991, based on specimens gathered at San Sperate in the Province of Cagliari, Sardinia. The specific epithet ochraceolutea combines the Latin for ochre (ochraceus) and yellow (luteus), alluding to the characteristic cap and gill colouration. The holotype (M. Contu 89/443) is preserved in the herbarium of the Centro Antille Mediterraneo (CAG) in Cagliari.

== Description ==
The fruit body bears a cap (pileus) 2–6.7 cm across, fleshy and at first convex before flattening or developing a slight central bump (umbo). The margin remains rolled inwards when young and is never striate. The cap surface is dry, finely tomentose (covered in short hairs) and varies from pale yellow to ochre‑yellow.

Beneath the cap are numerous thin, closely spaced gills (lamellae) that fork and run down the stipe (decurrent), coloured a pale yellow‑orange. The stipe measures 1.5–6.5 cm in length and 0.3–0.5 cm in thickness, tapering towards a rooting base and matching the cap in hue except for a darker ochre‑brown at its base, where greyish mycelium is often visible. The flesh is firm, pale yellow‑orange, turning brownish when handled, with a mild, fruity odour and taste. The spore print is white.

Microscopically, spores are 5.2–6.3 by 3–4.2 μm, smooth, hyaline (translucent) and cyanophilic (staining blue with certain dyes), non‑dextrinoid (not staining reddish‑brown in Melzer's reagent), elliptical to oblong‑cylindrical and bearing a small apiculus (point of attachment). Basidia are four‑spored and clamp connections are absent. Cystidia (specialised sterile cells) are not present. The cap cuticle (pileipellis) consists of loosely interwoven hyphae containing vacuolar pigments.

== Habitat and distribution ==
Hygrophoropsis ochraceolutea fruits gregariously in autumn beneath poplar species in moist, shaded locations. At the time of its original publication, it had only been recorded from central and southern Sardinia, where it is considered uncommon.
