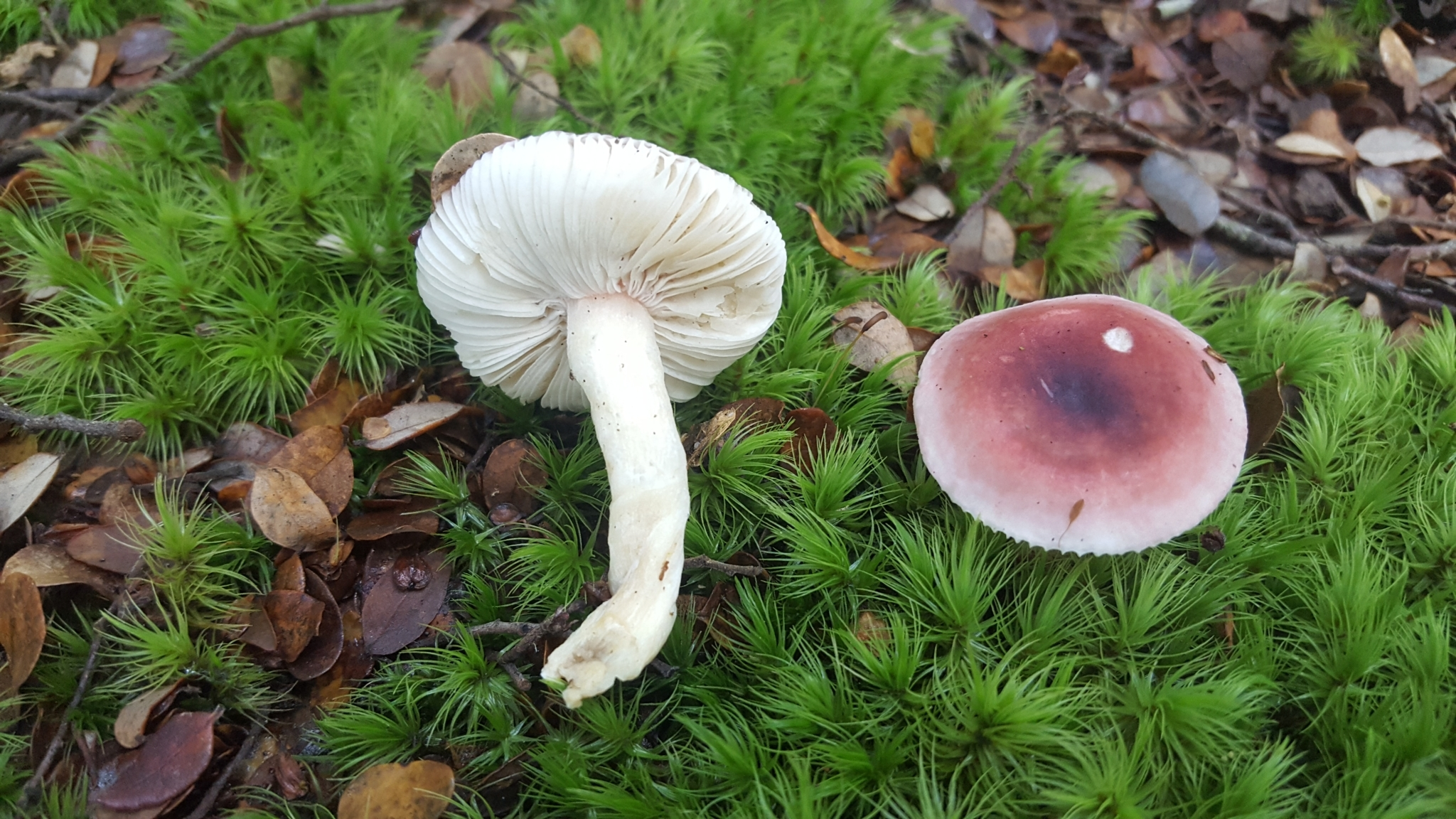
- Russula roseopileata observed by Noah Siegel, Fiordland National Park

Scientific classification
- Kingdom: Fungi
- Division: Basidiomycota
- Class: Agaricomycetes
- Order: Russulales
- Family: Russulaceae
- Genus: Russula
- Species: R. roseopileata

Binomial name
- Russula roseopileata McNabb

= Russula roseopileata =

Fungus taxonomical page

Russula roseopileata is a fungal species in the genus Russula. It is endemic to Aotearoa New Zealand.

== Taxonomy ==
The species was described in 1973 by mycologist Ross McNabb, typified by a collection made by McNabb on 8 January 1969 from Karamea, Umere in the South Island of New Zealand.

== Description ==
This species produces typical mushroom-like bodies. The pileus measures 1.5–4.5 cm in diameter. At immaturity, the pileus is hemispherical, then becoming centrally depressed at maturity. Under wet conditions the pileus is glabrous. The colour of the pileus is variable, with a red-dark red center and paling to greyish rose, rose/pink at edges, and occasionally creamy to pallid white, with pink, rose, purplish grey or a yellow tint. Lamellae are thin, and sometimes forked near the stipe, and remain white in colour. The stipe is up to 4 cm long, and occasionally expands basally. Diameter is usually 0.5–1.2 cm, and remains white under exposure to air. Lamellae and context taste extremely acrid. Chemical characteristics produced are: formalin on context produces no reaction, phenol slowly turns deep vinaceous, FeSO_{4} rapidly turns salmon pink, guaiacol on stipe base slowly becomes pinkish red, KOH on pileus red colours fade, leaving the area orange. KOH on context no reaction, NH_{4}OH on pileus and context results in no reaction.

== Habitat and range ==
Russula roseopileata is commonly gregarious under Nothofagus. This species is indigenous and endemic to New Zealand. It was notably collected by Ross McNabb within the Nelson region and along Lake Daniells Track within the Lewis Pass Region, West Coast of New Zealand.

== Etymology ==
The specific epithet roseopileata translates directly to 'pink capped', referring to the pink pileus.
