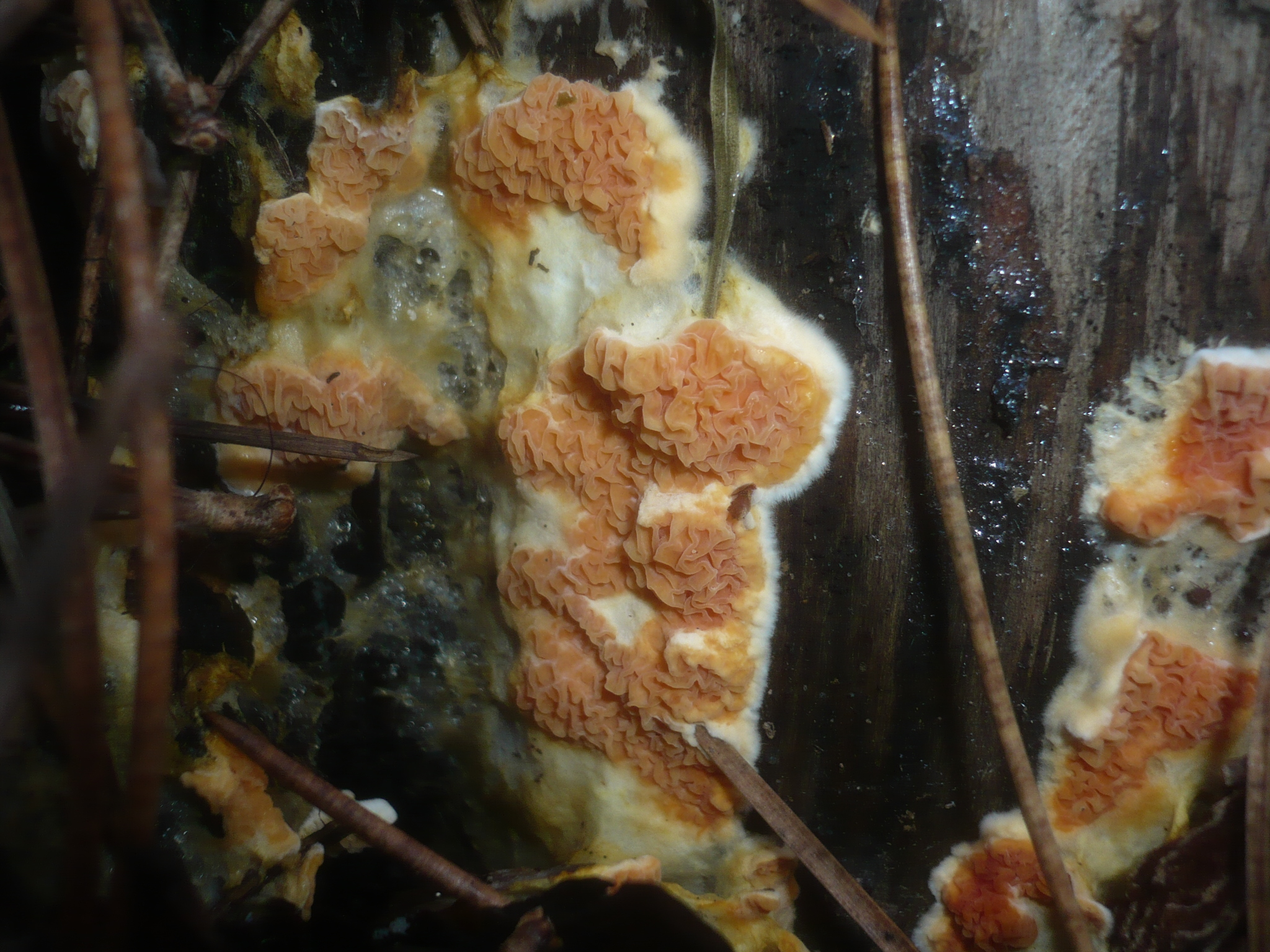

Scientific classification
- Kingdom: Fungi
- Division: Basidiomycota
- Class: Agaricomycetes
- Order: Boletales
- Family: Hygrophoropsidaceae
- Genus: Leucogyrophana
- Species: L. mollusca

Binomial name
- Leucogyrophana mollusca (Fr.) Pouzar (1958)

Synonyms
- Merulius molluscus Fr. (1821)

= Leucogyrophana mollusca =

Species of fungus

Leucogyrophana mollusca is a fungus of the genus Leucogyrophana and family Hygrophoropsidaceae.

Leucogyrophana mollusca mainly grows on dead conifer wood, helping decompose fallen trees and recycle nutrients back into the forest ecosystem.
