= Leucogyrophana pseudomollusca =

Scientific classification
- Kingdom: Fungi
- Division: Basidiomycota
- Class: Agaricomycetes
- Order: Boletales
- Family: Hygrophoropsidaceae
- Genus: Leucogyrophana
- Species: L. pseudomollusca

Binomial name
- Leucogyrophana pseudomollusca (Parmasto) Parmasto (1967)

Synonyms
- Merulius pseudomolluscus Parmasto (1962)

Species of fungus

Leucogyrophana pseudomollusca is a fungus of the genus Leucogyrophana and family Hygrophoropsidaceae. It was originally described by Estonian mycologist Erast Parmasto in 1962 as a species of Merulius. He transferred it to Leucogyrophana in 1967.
