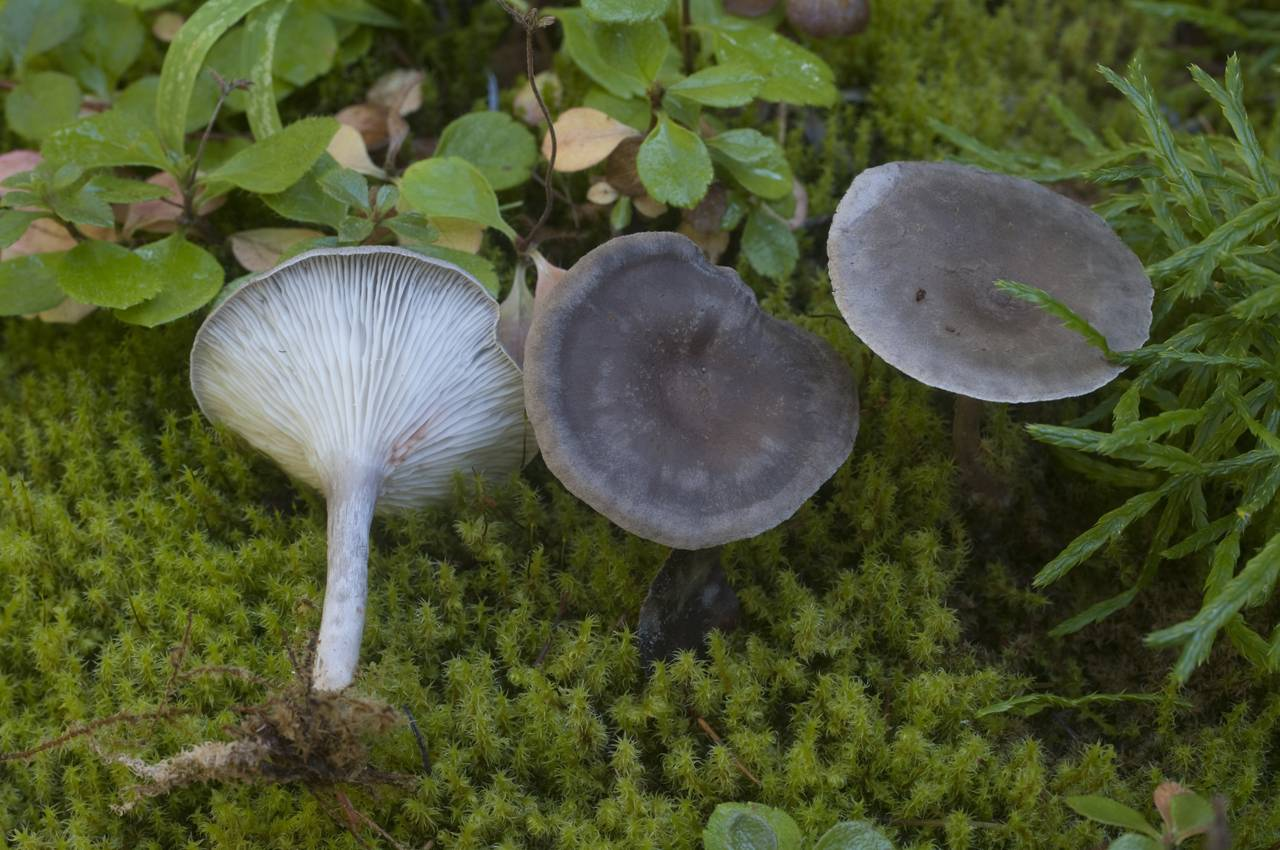

Conservation status
- Least Concern (IUCN 3.1)

Scientific classification
- Kingdom: Fungi
- Division: Basidiomycota
- Class: Agaricomycetes
- Order: Agaricales
- Family: Tricholomataceae
- Genus: Cantharellula
- Species: C. umbonata

Binomial name
- Cantharellula umbonata (J.F.Gmel.) Singer (1936)

Synonyms
- Cantharellus umbonatus (J.F. Gmel.) Pers.; Hygrophoropsis umbonata (J.F. Gmel.) Kühner & Romagn.; Merulius umbonatus J.F.Gmel. (1792)

= Cantharellula umbonata =

Species of fungus

Cantharellula umbonata
- Mycological characteristics
- Gills on hymenium
- Cap is umbonate
- Hymenium is decurrent
- Stipe is bare
- Spore print is white
- Ecology is saprotrophic
- Edibility is not recommended

Cantharellula umbonata, the humpback, is a species of fungus in the genus Cantharellula.

The gray cap is slightly convex and 2–5 centimetres (3/4–2 in) wide. The gills are decurrent and mostly forked. The stem is up to 8 cm (3 1/4 in) wide. The flesh is whitish and may stain reddish. The smell and taste are often mild. The spore print is white. Hygrophoropsis aurantiaca has forked (but orange) gills.

It is common in eastern North America, particularly in summer and autumn. It is associated with Polytrichum and other mosses found in the southeastern United States. It commonly grows in boggy areas and under conifers. It is edible, and best when young.
