= Hygrophoropsis fuscosquamula =

Scientific classification
- Kingdom: Fungi
- Division: Basidiomycota
- Class: Agaricomycetes
- Order: Boletales
- Family: Hygrophoropsidaceae
- Genus: Hygrophoropsis
- Species: H. fuscosquamula

Binomial name
- Hygrophoropsis fuscosquamula P.D.Orton (1960)

Species of fungus

Hygrophoropsis fuscosquamula is a species of fungus in the family Hygrophoropsidaceae. Found in Europe, it was described as new to science by English mycologist Peter Darbishire Orton in 1960. Fruit bodies of the fungus have whitish cream to pale yellowish caps with many small, olive-brown scales. Its spores measure 6.0–8.0 by 3.5–4.5 μm.
