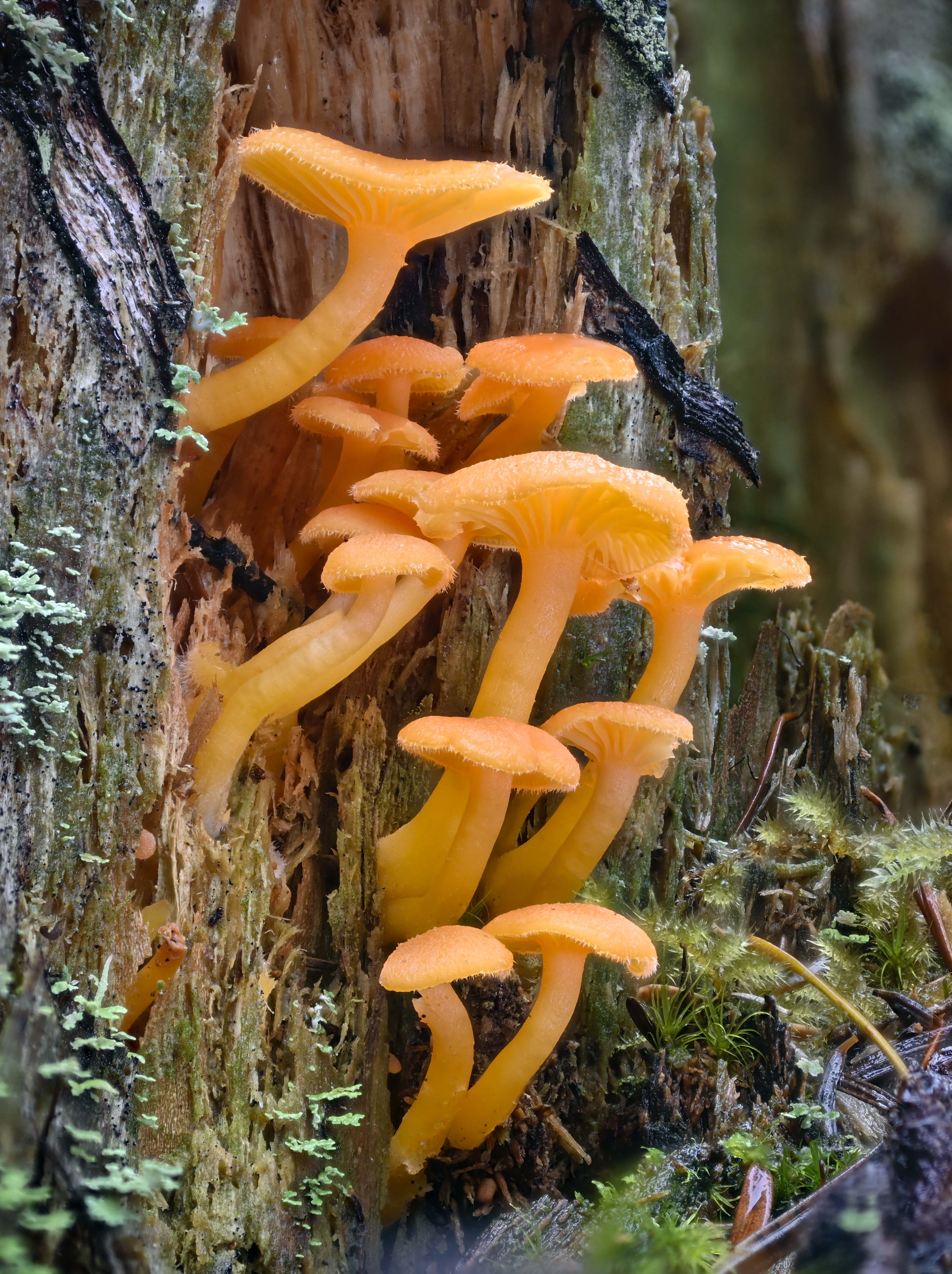
- Chrysomphalina aurantiaca

Scientific classification
- Kingdom: Fungi
- Division: Basidiomycota
- Class: Agaricomycetes
- Order: Agaricales
- Family: Hygrophoraceae
- Genus: Chrysomphalina; Clémençon (1982)

Type species
- Chrysomphalina chrysophylla (Fr.) Clémençon (1982)

Species
- C. aurantiaca C. chrysophylla C. grossula

= Chrysomphalina =

Genus of fungi

Chrysomphalina is a genus of three species of fungi with a north temperate distribution. The genus was circumscribed by Swiss mycologist Heinz Clémençon in 1982.

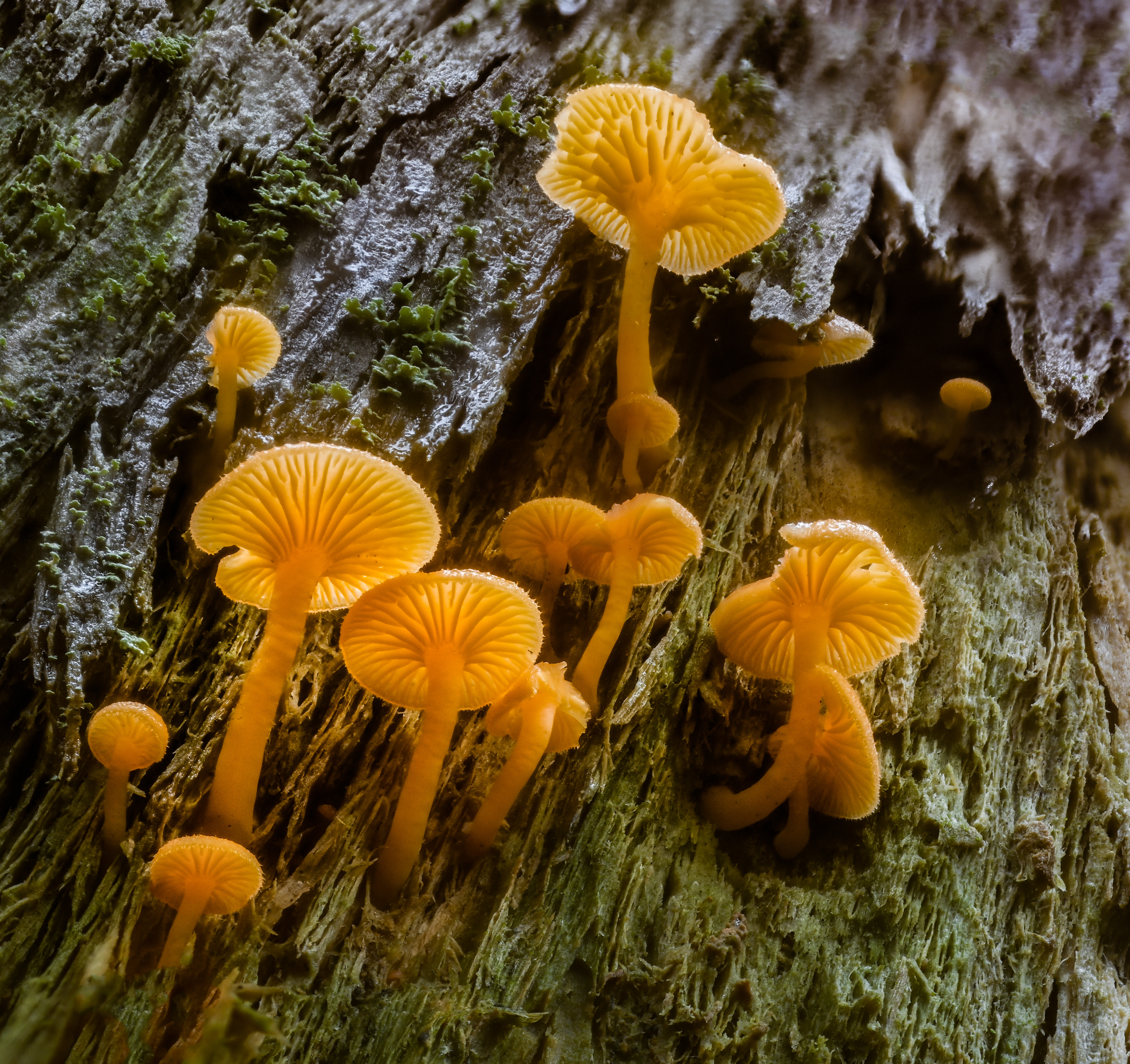
Chrysomphalina aurantiaca underside

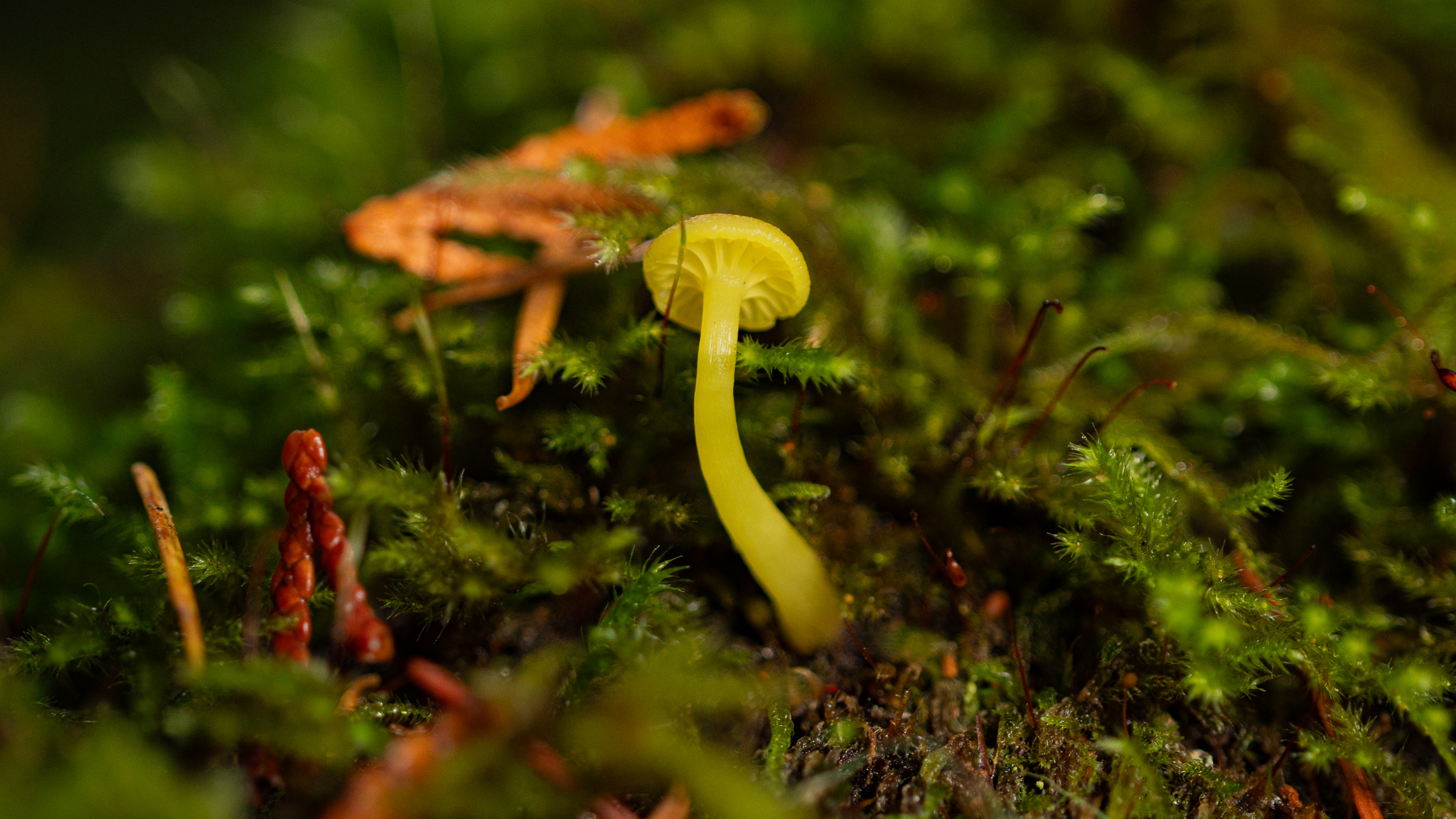
Chrysomphalina grossula in Port Angeles, WA USA

== See also ==
- List of Agaricales genera
