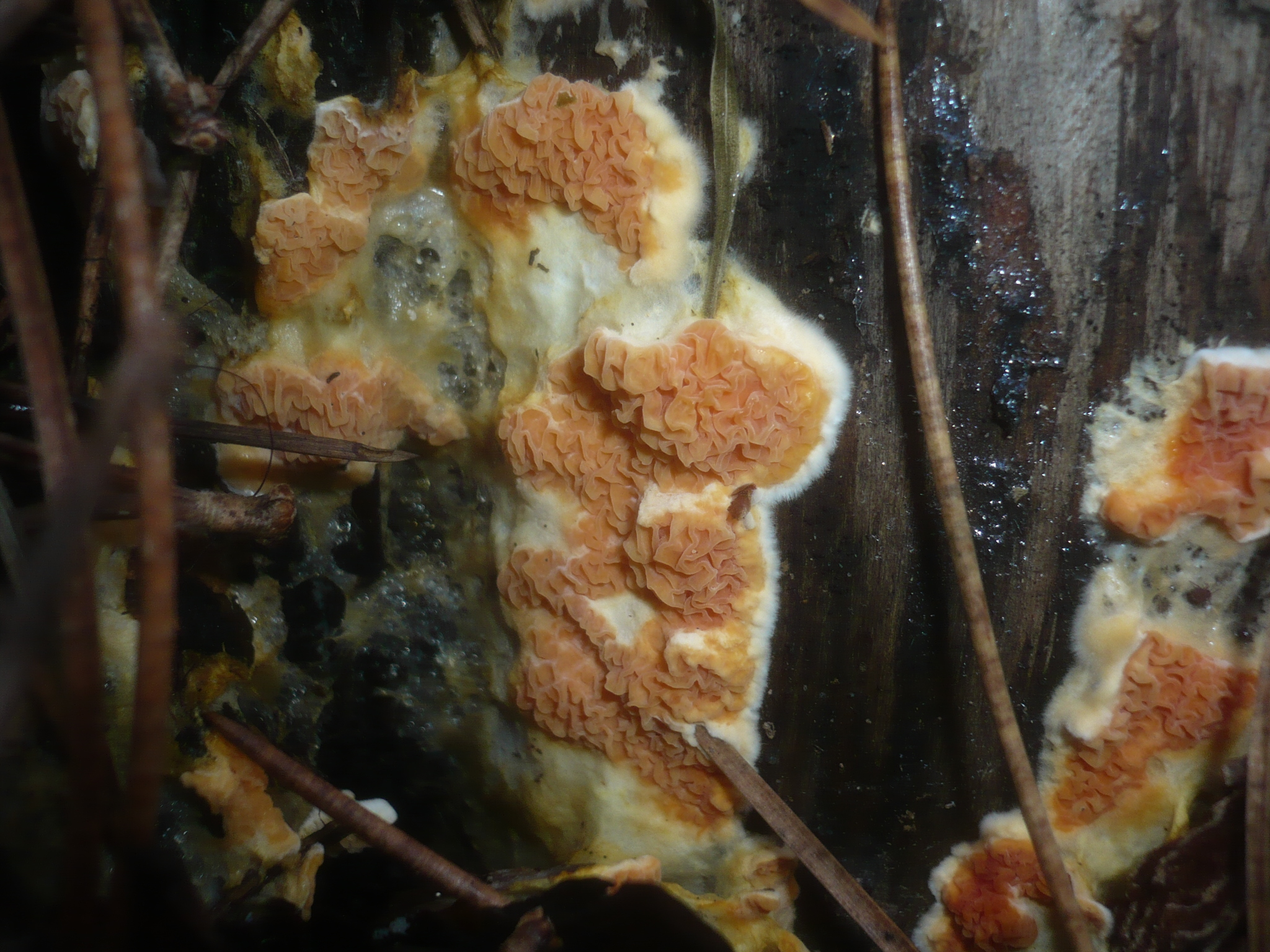
- Leucogyrophana mollusca

Scientific classification
- Kingdom: Fungi
- Division: Basidiomycota
- Class: Agaricomycetes
- Order: Boletales
- Family: Hygrophoropsidaceae
- Genus: Leucogyrophana; Pouzar (1958)

Type species
- Leucogyrophana mollusca (Fr.) Pouzar (1958)

= Leucogyrophana =

Genus of fungi

Leucogyrophana is a genus of fungi in the family Hygrophoropsidaceae (suborder Coniophorineae of the order Boletales). The genus was erected in 1958 to accommodate the species then known as Merulius molluscus (Leucogyrophana mollusca). Several more species were described, but DNA testing in 2001 found that L. mollusca was isolated genetically from the others, and most closely related instead to Hygrophoropsis.

== Species ==
As of November 2015, Index Fungorum accepts 11 species of Leucogyrophana:

- Leucogyrophana arizonica
- Leucogyrophana hexagonoides
- Leucogyrophana lichenicola
- Leucogyrophana luridochracea
- Leucogyrophana mollusca
- Leucogyrophana olivascens
- Leucogyrophana pouzarii
- Leucogyrophana pseudomollusca
- Leucogyrophana romellii
- Leucogyrophana sororia
- Leucogyrophana subtessulata

=== Not accepted names ===
- Leucogyrophana montana (Burt) Domański ==> Pseudomerulius montanus (Burt) Kotir., K.H. Larss. & M. Kulju
