= Hygrophoropsis tapinia =

Scientific classification
- Domain: Eukaryota
- Kingdom: Fungi
- Division: Basidiomycota
- Class: Agaricomycetes
- Order: Boletales
- Family: Hygrophoropsidaceae
- Genus: Hygrophoropsis
- Species: H. tapinia

Binomial name
- Hygrophoropsis tapinia Singer (1946)

Species of fungus

Hygrophoropsis tapinia is a species of fungus in the family Hygrophoropsidaceae. It was described as new to science by mycologist Rolf Singer in 1946. Originally described from Florida, it was later recorded in Costa Rica.
