= Henry William Ravenel =

United States botanist (1814–1887)

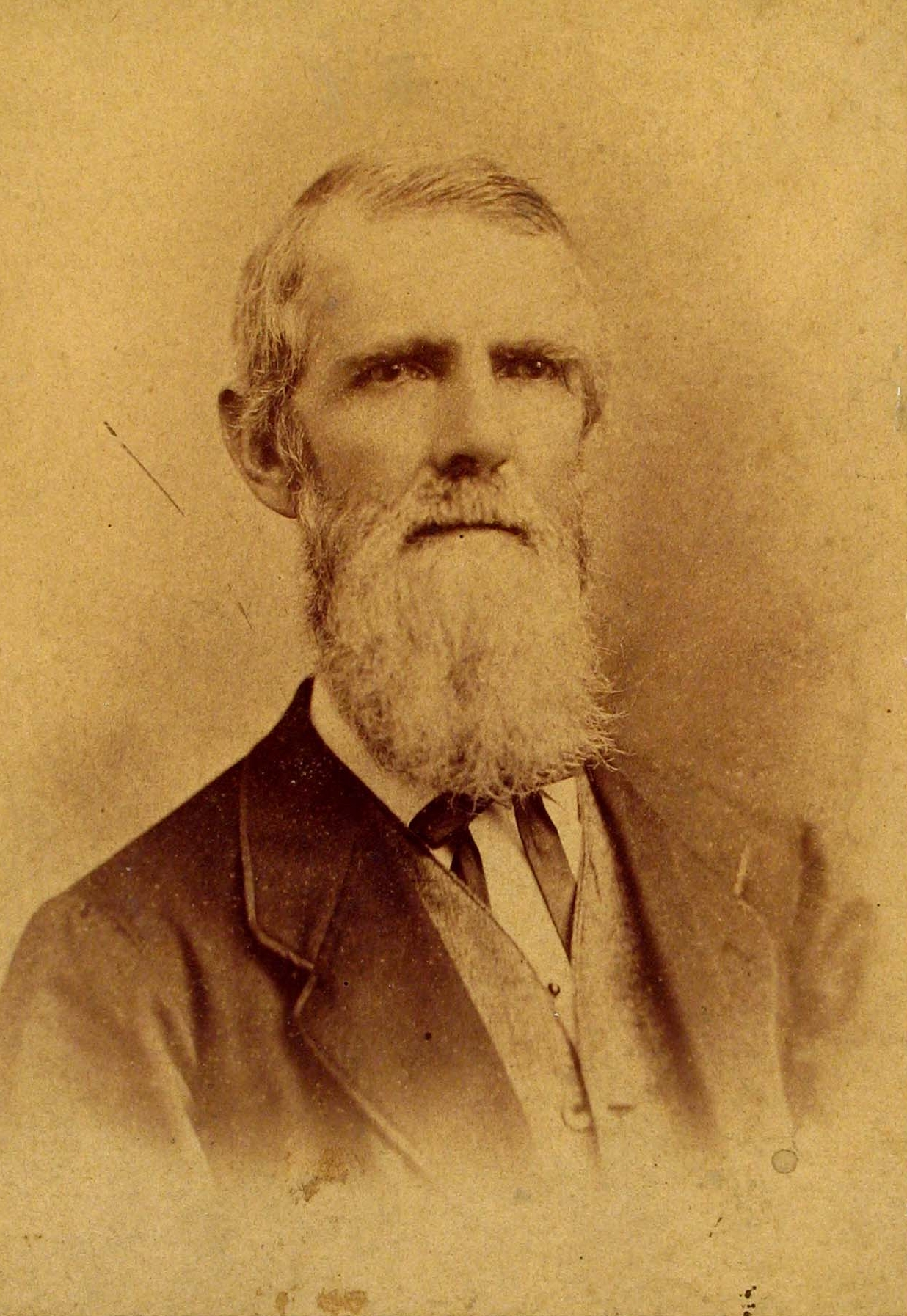
- Born: May 19, 1814; Berkeley County, South Carolina
- Died: July 17, 1887 (aged 73); Aiken, South Carolina
- Occupations: Planter, botanist

Henry William Ravenel (May 19, 1814 – July 17, 1887) was an American planter and botanist. He studied fungi and cryptogams in South Carolina, discovering a large number of new species. The genus Ravenelia is named after him, along with many of the species he discovered.

== Biography ==
=== Early life ===
Henry William Ravenel was born on May 19, 1814, on the Pooshee Plantation in Berkeley County, South Carolina. The plantation had been in his family since before 1716. It now lies beneath the waters of Lake Moultrie, which was created in 1939. The nearest existing place is Bonneau.

He attended the nearby Pineville Academy and graduated in 1832 from South Carolina College, now the University of South Carolina, where he was a member of the Clariosophic Society.

=== Career ===
He inherited the Pooshee Plantation from his father, and was a slave owner. He was also a regular diarist, and recorded his beliefs that former slaves should be regulated. He wrote in September 1865 "There must ... be stringent laws to control the negroes, & require them to fulfill their contracts of labor on the farm." In 1860, he supported secession as "the only means of safety to our institutions".

He made a critical study of the phaenogams (phanerogams?) of South Carolina, was botanist of the government commission to Texas in 1869 and was agricultural editor of the Weekly News and Courier. The genus Ravenelia of the Uredineae is named in his honor. He was credited with being the only American after the Rev. Moses A. Curtis, who knew specifically the fungi of the United States. The University of North Carolina gave him the degree of LL.D. in 1886.

=== Death ===
He died on July 17, 1887, in Aiken, South Carolina.

== Works ==
- The exsiccata series Fungi Caroliniani Exsiccati (1853–60)
- The exsiccata series Fungi Americani Exsiccati, with M. C. Cooke (1878–82)
- The Private Journal of Henry William Ravenel, 1859–1887 (Columbia, South Carolina: University of South Carolina Press, 1947).

== Secondary source ==
- Tamara Miner Haygood, Henry William Ravenel, 1814–1887: South Carolina Scientist in the Civil War Era, Tuscaloosa, Alabama: University of Alabama Press, 1987.

== Works cited ==
- Channing, Steven (1974). Crisis of Fear: Secession in South Carolina. W. W. Norton & Company. ISBN 0-393-00730-8.
