= Cortinarius hesleri =

Scientific classification
- Domain: Eukaryota
- Kingdom: Fungi
- Division: Basidiomycota
- Class: Agaricomycetes
- Order: Agaricales
- Family: Cortinariaceae
- Genus: Cortinarius
- Species: C. hesleri

Binomial name
- Cortinarius hesleri Ammirati, Niskanen, Liimat. & Matheny (2013)

Species of fungus

Cortinarius hesleri is an agaric fungus in the family Cortinariaceae. Officially described in 2013, it is found in eastern North America. It is named after American mycologist Lexemuel Ray Hesler.

== See also ==
- List of Cortinarius species
