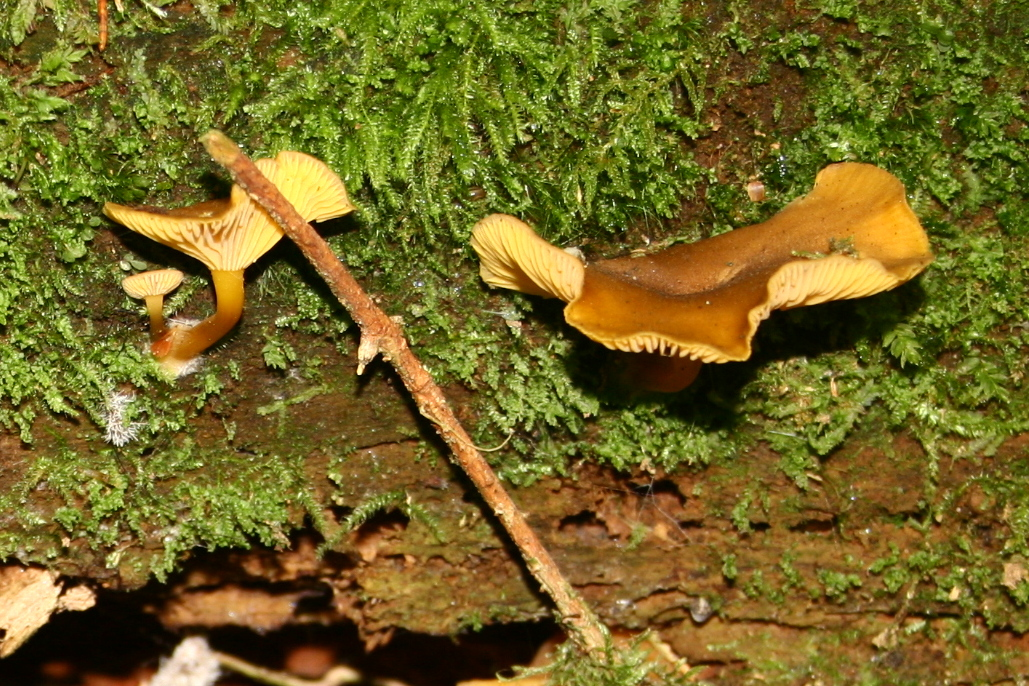

Scientific classification
- Kingdom: Fungi
- Division: Basidiomycota
- Class: Agaricomycetes
- Order: Agaricales
- Family: Hygrophoraceae
- Genus: Chrysomphalina
- Species: C. chrysophylla

Binomial name
- Chrysomphalina chrysophylla (Fr.) Clémençon (1982)

= Chrysomphalina chrysophylla =

Species of fungus

Chrysomphalina chrysophylla is a species of mushroom with a north temperate distribution. Described by Elias Magnus Fries in 1821, it was placed in the genus Chrysomphalina by Swiss mycologist Heinz Clémençon in 1982.

The yellow caps are 1–5 centimetres (1/2–2 in) wide and the stems 1–4 cm (1/2–1 1/2 in) long. The spore print is yellowish. It may resemble C. aurantiaca or Gerronema strombodes.
