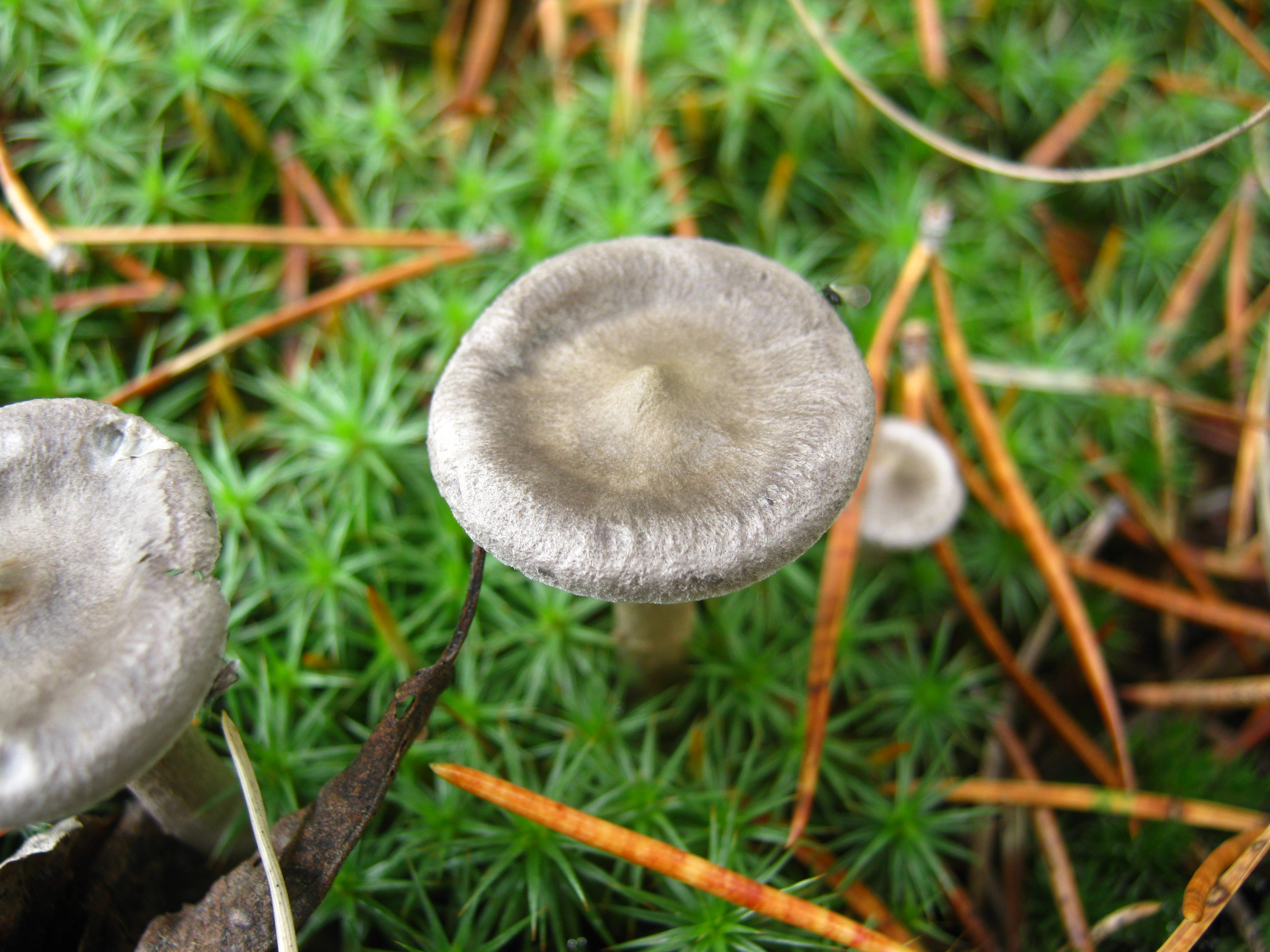
- Cantharellula umbonata

Scientific classification
- Domain: Eukaryota
- Kingdom: Fungi
- Division: Basidiomycota
- Class: Agaricomycetes
- Order: Agaricales
- Family: Tricholomataceae
- Genus: Cantharellula; Singer (1936)

Type species
- Cantharellula umbonata (J.F.Gmel.) Singer (1936)

= Cantharellula =

Genus of fungi

Cantharellula is a genus of mushroom-forming fungi in the family Hygrophoraceae. The genus was described by mycologist Rolf Singer in 1936.

== Species ==
- C. alpina
- C. coprophila
- C. humicola
- C. infundibuliformis
- C. intermedia
- C. lilacinopruinatus
- C. oregonensis
- C. tarnensis
- C. umbonata
- C. waiporiensis

== See also ==
- List of Agaricales genera
