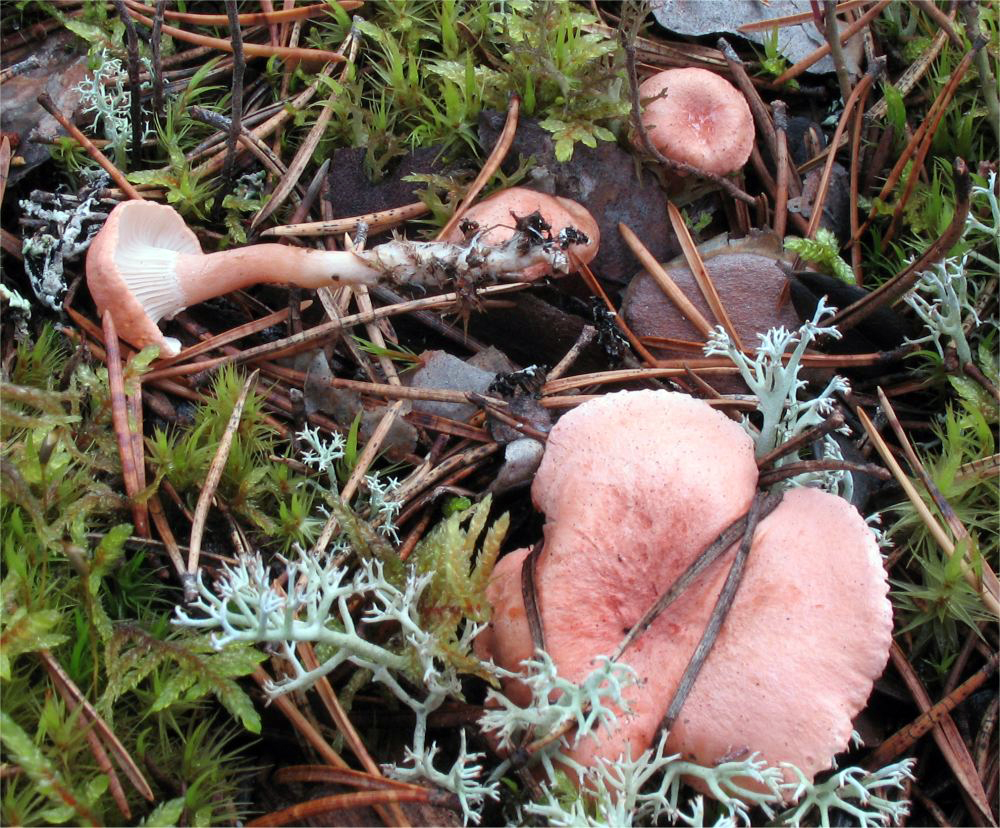
- Found in Västerbotten, Sweden

Scientific classification
- Kingdom: Fungi
- Division: Basidiomycota
- Class: Agaricomycetes
- Order: Agaricales
- Family: Hygrophoraceae
- Genus: Aphroditeola; Redhead & Manfr.Binder (2013)

Type species
- Aphroditeola olida (Quél.) Redhead & Manfr.Binder (2013)

Synonyms
- Cantharellus olidus Quél., in Cooke & Quélet, (1878); Merulius olidus (Quél.) Kuntze (1891); Clitocybe olida (Quél.) Konrad (1929); Hygrophoropsis olida (Quél.) Métrod (1949)

= Aphroditeola =

Genus of fungi

Aphroditeola is an agaric fungal monotypic genus that produces pink cantharelloid fruit bodies on coniferous forest floors. The lamellae are forked and typically the fruit bodies have a fragrant odor described as candy-like, cinnamon-like or pink bubble gum-like. It contains the one species Aphroditeola olida, which is commonly known as the pink bubblegum mushroom.

In the last century it was classified in Hygrophoropsis, a genus in the Boletales. However, Hygrophoropsis has dextrinoid basidiospores, while Aphroditeola lacks these. Phylogenetically Aphroditeola is classified in the Agaricales near the Hygrophoraceae. Little is known about its biology except that the type species can be grown in culture from basidiospores and it produces pinkish to reddish-orange mycelium. In other literature and web sites, the type species is called by synonymous names Hygrophoropsis morganii or Hygrophoropsis olida or incorrectly labelled Hygrophoropsis rufescens, a misapplied name.

== Etymology ==
The name Aphroditeola is an allusion to Aphrodite Greek goddess because of the combination of pretty pink coloration and perfume-like odor. The specific epithet (olida) is from the Latin olidus, meaning "smelling" or "rank".

In some literature it is known as Hygrophoropsis morganii based on the earlier classification and the incorrect presumption that the type species was named Cantharellus morganii before the name Cantharellus olidus.
