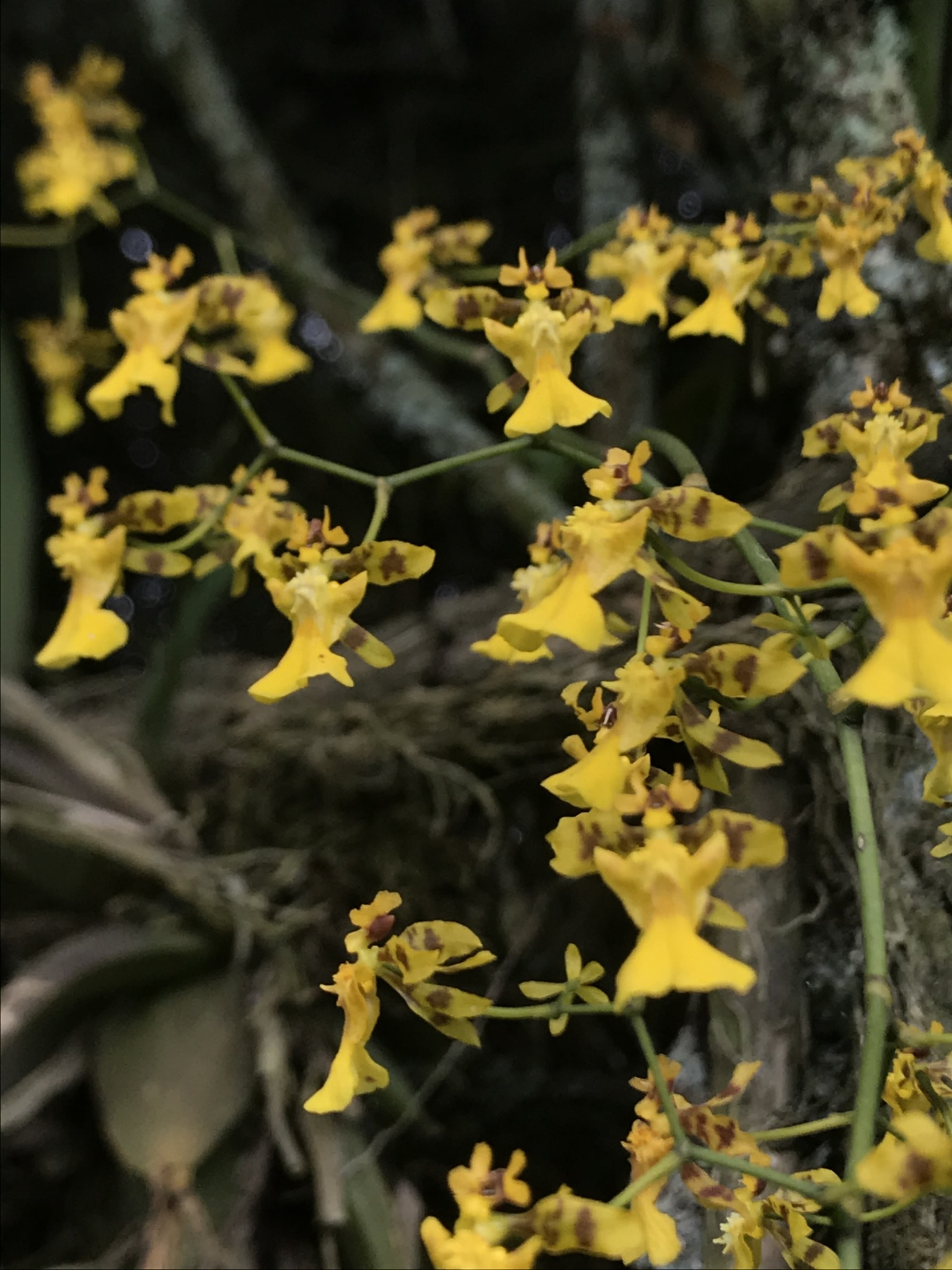

Scientific classification
- Kingdom: Plantae
- Clade: Tracheophytes
- Clade: Angiosperms
- Clade: Monocots
- Order: Asparagales
- Family: Orchidaceae
- Subfamily: Epidendroideae
- Genus: Oncidium
- Species: O. ornithorhynchum

Binomial name
- Oncidium ornithorhynchum Kunth

= Oncidium ornithorhynchum =

Species of orchid

Oncidium ornithorhynchum is a species of orchid found from Mexico to Colombia. The species has been confused with Oncidium sotoanum, a pink-colored flower, until it was given its own name in 2010.
