= Bernhard Studer-Steinhäuslin =

Swiss pharmacist and naturalist (1847–1910)

Bernhard Studer-Steinhäuslin (23 May 1847 – 28 March 1910) was a Swiss pharmacist and naturalist.

He was born in Bern, the son of a pharmacist, and attended the schools of his city until 1865. He was involved in a serious accident in 1860, when the scaffolding holding him and a schoolmate collapsed. The latter was killed instantly; Studer-Steinhäuslin suffered a severe concussion from the incident, and his left hand was paralyzed for the rest of his life.

In 1865 he joined the pharmaceutical profession. He studied under Dr. Teuner at Darmstadt and in 1869 went to Dresden for additional practical training. His scientific studies he made at the University of Bern and the Institute of Remigius Fresenius in Wiesbaden, from which he graduated as a pharmacist in 1872.

After a trip to Paris, England and Scotland, he joined his father's pharmacy on Spitalgasse in Bern, eventually taking over the business together with his brother William, who preceded him in death in 1907. He served in this position for 33 years, from 1877 to 1910. He was a long time member of the board of the municipal pharmacists association. He was a member of the Executive Board of the cantonal pharmacists association from 1878–1902; he held the office of President in 1896–1907. He belonged to the board of the Swiss Pharmacists association for many years, holding the position of secretary from 1875 to 1883, Vice-President in 1883 to 1884, and president in 1885 to 1887. In 1884 he presided over the Pharmacopoeia Commission of the Swiss Pharmacists Association, and belonged to the permanent Pharmacopoeia of this association as secretary until 1897. Studer-Steinhäuslin was also treasurer of the Society of Natural Sciences in Bern.

Studer-Steinhäuslin died of pneumonia on March 28, 1910 in Bern.

== Selected publications ==
- (1887). "Les principaux champignons comestibles peints d'après nature et décrits". Lausanne:F. Payot.
- (1890). "Beiträge zur Kenntnis der schweizerischen Pilze". K.J. Wyss
- (1895). "Beiträge zur Geschichte der stadtbern : Apotheken". Bern: Stämpfli.
- (1909). "Pharmacopoeae Helvetiae IV Extractum / continens praecepta medicaminum Galenicor. hoc libro recepta auctoritate Societatis Pharmaceuticae Helveticae elaboravit B. Studer II." Bern: Neukomm & Zimmermann.
