= Ross McNabb =

New Zealand mycologist (1934–1972)

Robert Francis Ross McNabb (11 December 1934 – 14 December 1972) was a New Zealand mycologist. He was born in Kawakawa, and attended local schools in his youth, including Whangarei Boys' High School and Southland Boys' High School. He received a BSc degree from the University of Otago in 1956, and two years later an MSc for his work on mycorrhizae morphology in native New Zealand plants. In 1961, having been awarded a National Research Fellowship the year before, McNabb left New Zealand for the UK to study with Cecil Terence Ingold at Birkbeck College. McNabb earned a PhD in 1963; his thesis was titled "Taxonomic studies in the Dacrymycetaceae". He was jointly awarded the Hamilton Memorial Prize in 1966 from The Royal Society of New Zealand, the same year he was appointed to the editorial board of the New Zealand Journal of Botany. Most of McNabb's later publications, largely published in this journal, were about fungal taxonomy. Fungus species named in honor of McNabb include Paxillus mcnabbii (now Austropaxillus mcnabbii), and Entoloma mcnabbianum.

== Selected publications ==
- McNabb, R.F.R. (1962). "Additions to the rust fungi of New Zealand. III". Transactions of the Royal Society of New Zealand Bot. 1 (8): 109–116.
- McNabb, R.F.R. (1962). "The graminicolous rust fungi of New Zealand". Transactions of the Royal Society of New Zealand Bot. 1 (19): 235–257.
- McNabb, R.F.R. (1962). "The genus Exobasidium in New Zealand". Transactions of the Royal Society of New Zealand Bot. 1 (20): 259–268.
- McNabb, R.F.R. (1964). "New Zealand Tremellales. 1". New Zealand Journal of Botany 2 (4): 403–414. doi:10.1080/0028825X.1964.10428761
- McNabb, R.F.R. (1964). "Taxonomic studies in the Dacrymycetaceae. I. Cerinomyces". New Zealand Journal of Botany 2 (4): 415–424. doi:10.1080/0028825X.1964.10428762
- McNabb, R.F.R. (1965). "Taxonomic studies in the Dacrymycetaceae. II. Calocera (Fries) Fries". New Zealand Journal of Botany 3 (1): 31–58.doi:10.1080/0028825X.1965.10428712
- McNabb, R.F.R. (1965). "Taxonomic studies in the Dacrymycetaceae. III. Dacryopinax Martin". New Zealand Journal of Botany 3 (1): 59–72. doi:10.1080/0028825X.1965.10432062
- McNabb, R.F.R. (1965). "Taxonomic studies in the Dacrymycetaceae. IV. Guepiniopsis Patouillard" New Zealand Journal of Botany 3 (2): 159–167. doi:10.1080/0028825X.1965.10876992
- McNabb, R.F.R. (1965). "Taxonomic studies on the Dacrymycetaceae. V. Heterotextus Lloyd". New Zealand Journal of Botany 3 (3): 215–222. doi:10.1080/0028825X.1965.10428722
- McNabb, R.F.R. (1965). "Taxonomic studies on the Dacrymycetaceae. VI. Femsjonia Fries". New Zealand Journal of Botany 3 (3): 223–228. doi:10.1080/0028825X.1965.10428723
- McNabb, R.F.R. (1965). "Some auriculariaceous fungi from the British Isles". Transactions of the British Mycological Society 48 (2): 187–192.
- McNabb, R.F.R. (1968). "The boletaceae of New Zealand". New Zealand Journal of Botany 6 (2): 137–176. doi:10.1080/0028825X.1968.10429056
- McNabb, R.F.R. (1973). "Taxonomic studies in the Dracymycetaceae. VIII. Dacrymyces Nees ex Fries". New Zealand Journal of Botany 11 (3): 461–524.
