= Moses Ashley Curtis =

American botanist (1808–1872)

Moses Ashley Curtis (11 May 1808 – 10 April 1872) was an American botanist.

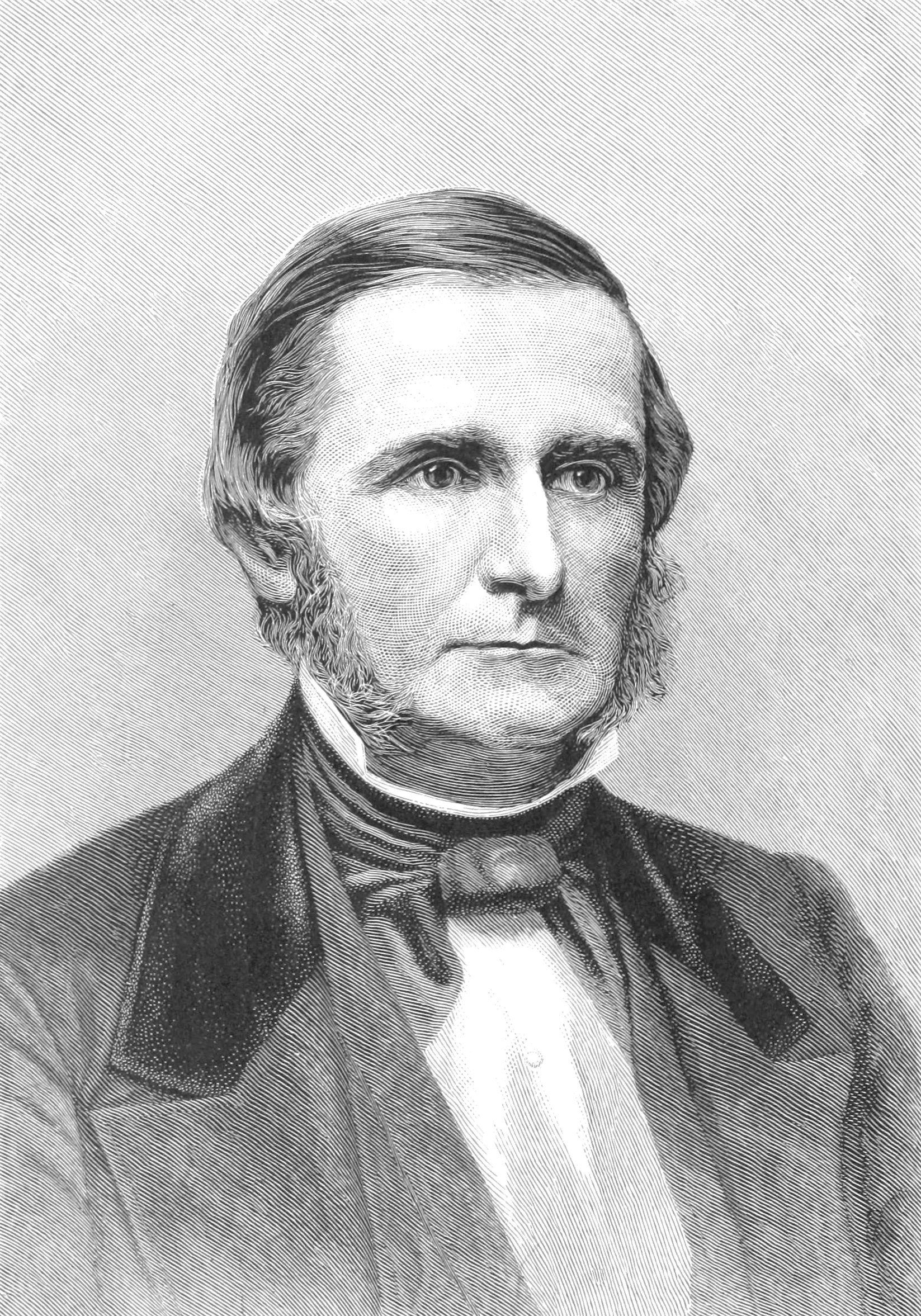
Moses Ashley Curtis

== Biography ==
Curtis was born in Stockbridge, Massachusetts and educated at Williams College in Massachusetts. After graduating, he became a tutor for the children of former Governor Edward Bishop Dudley in Wilmington, North Carolina, returning to Massachusetts in 1833 to study theology. He married Mary de Rosset in 1834, was ordained in 1835 and obtained a post to teach at the Episcopal school at Raleigh, North Carolina. He became rector of the Protestant Episcopal Church at Hillsborough, North Carolina in 1841 and in charge of a parish at Society Hill, South Carolina in 1847 before returning to the Protestant Episcopal Church at Hillsborough in 1857. He died in Hillsborough, North Carolina in 1872.

As a botanist, Curtis explored the southern Appalachian Mountains, embarking on a major expedition in 1839. He maintained a herbarium of dried specimens and contributed specimens to John Torrey and Asa Gray. He collected lichens for Edward Tuckerman and corresponded with many other botanists, including mycologist Miles Joseph Berkeley to whom he sent many specimens with descriptions and notes. Gray said of him that "No living botanist ... is so well acquainted with the vegetation of the southern Allegheny Mountains ..." and that he "... was among the first to retrace the steps and rediscover the plants found and published by the elder Michaux, in the higher Alleghany Mountains." For the last twenty-five years of his life, he studied and became an authority on mycology.
