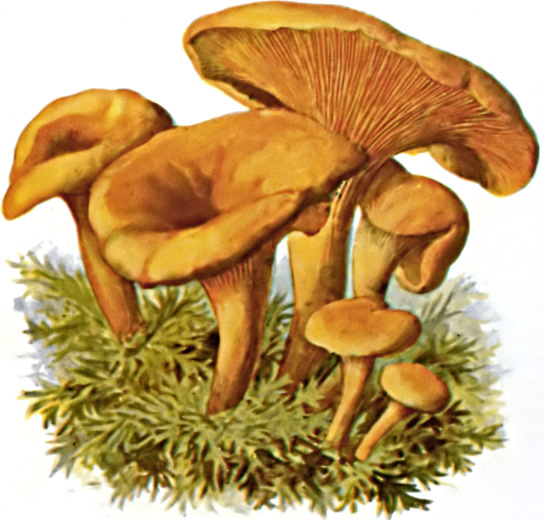
- False chanterelle, Albin Schmalfuß, 1897

Scientific classification
- Kingdom: Fungi
- Division: Basidiomycota
- Class: Agaricomycetes
- Order: Boletales
- Family: Hygrophoropsidaceae; Kühner (1980)

Type genus
- Hygrophoropsis (J.Schröt.) Maire ex Martin-Sans (1929)

Genera
- Hygrophoropsis; Leucogyrophana

= Hygrophoropsidaceae =

Family of fungi

The Hygrophoropsidaceae are a family of mushrooms that are gilled in appearance but lie within the Boletales. The family contains 18 species within two genera: Leucogyrophana and Hygrophoropsis, with the best-known member being the "false chanterelle", Hygrophoropsis aurantiaca. Hygrophoropsidaceae was circumscribed by French mycologist Robert Kühner in 1980, with Hygrophoropsis as the type genus. Unlike most members of the Boletales, Hygrophoropsidaceae species are saprophytic wood-rotting fungi that cause brown rot in their hosts. The genera Austropaxillus and Tapinella, once placed in this family, are now classified in the Serpulaceae and Tapinellaceae, respectively.
