= Cyclovariegatin =

Names
- IUPAC name 4-(1,2,4,7,8-Pentahydroxydibenzofuran-3-yl)cyclohexa-3,5-diene-1,2-dione

Identifiers
CAS Number	55692-59-6
3D model (JSmol)	Interactive image
PubChem CID	13889551
UNII	JP8UL2J9LA
CompTox Dashboard (EPA)	DTXSID301178863
- InChI: InChI=1S/C18H10O8/c19-8-2-1-6(3-9(8)20)13-15(23)16(24)14-7-4-10(21)11(22)5-12(7)26-18(14)17(13)25/h1-5,21-25H Key: OBXJPYUGUFLTRB-UHFFFAOYSA-N
- SMILES: C1=CC(=O)C(=O)C=C1C2=C(C3=C(C4=CC(=C(C=C4O3)O)O)C(=C2O)O)O

Properties
Chemical formula	C_{18}H_{10}O_{8}
Molar mass	354.270 g·mol^{−1}
- Except where otherwise noted, data are given for materials in their standard state (at 25 °C [77 °F], 100 kPa). Infobox references

Cyclovariegatin is a pigment. Its chemical name is 1,4-dihydro-2,7,8-trihydroxy-3-(3,4-dihydroxyphenyl)-l,4-dioxodibenzofuran. It is distinguishable by its UV-Vis spectra with maxima at 257, 296, and 430 nm. The variants cyclovariegatin-pentaacetate, cyclovariegatin-2,3',8-triacetate, and cyclovariegatin-2-acetate have also been described. It is derived from atromentin. It has been isolated from the browned skin of Suillus grevillei var. badius, and becomes the pigment thelephoric acid.

== See also ==
- Pulvinic acid
- Pulvinone
- Vulpinic acid
