= List of Serpula species =

This is a list of species in the fungus genus Serpula.

== Species ==
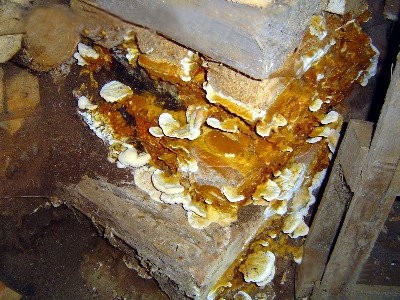
Serpula lacrimans

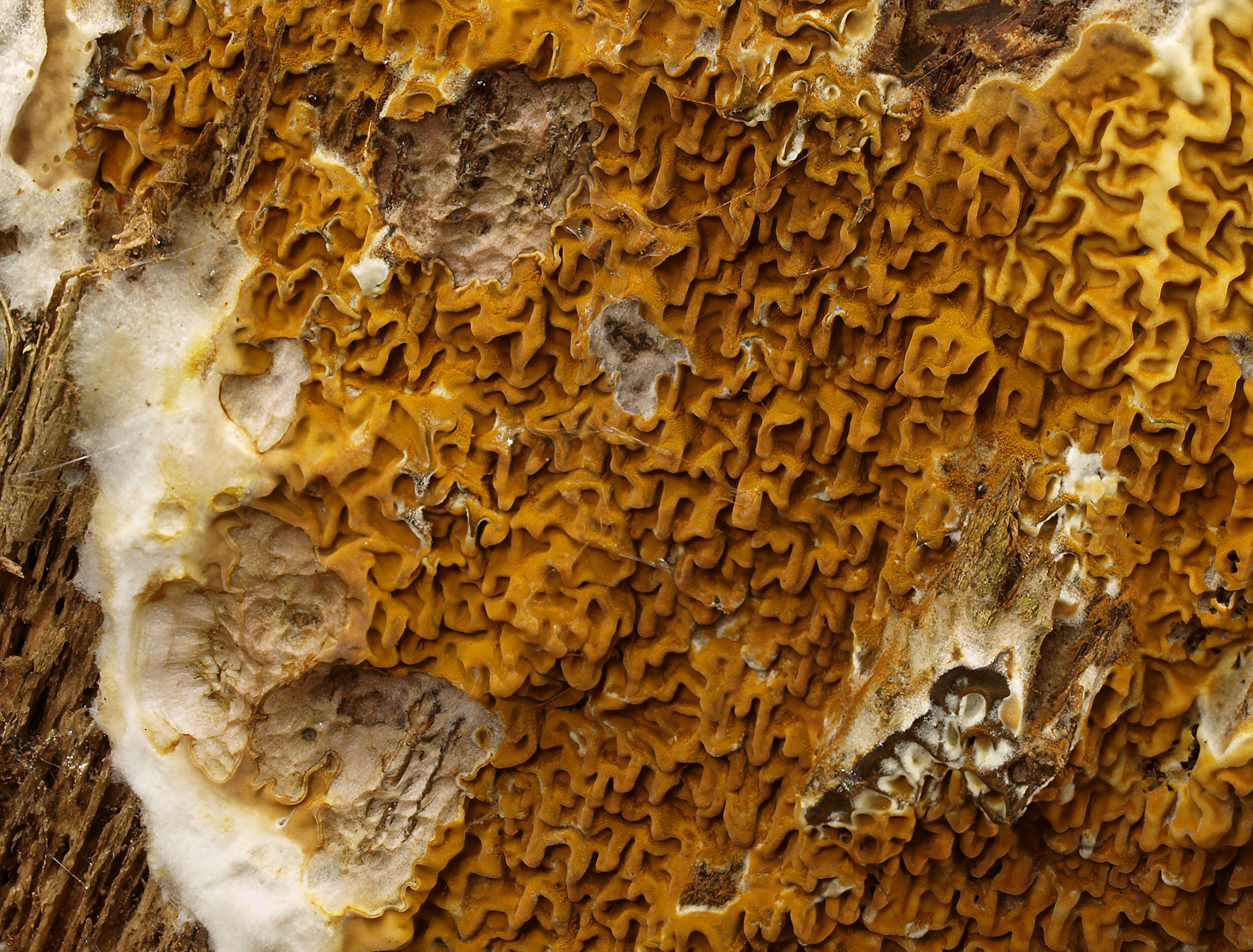
Serpula himantioides

- Serpula americana
- Serpula arizonica
- Serpula atrovirens
- Serpula aurea
- Serpula borealis
- Serpula byssoidea
- Serpula chlorina
- Serpula costaricensis
- Serpula crassa
- Serpula destruens
- Serpula domestica
- Serpula elliottii
- Serpula erecta
- Serpula eurocephala
- Serpula fugax
- Serpula fusca
- Serpula fuscescens
- Serpula hexagonoides
- Serpula himantioides
- Serpula illudens
- Serpula imperfecta
- Serpula incrassata
- Serpula lacrymans
- Serpula luridochracea
- Serpula minor
- Serpula mollusca
- Serpula montana
- Serpula olivacea
- Serpula olivascens
- Serpula panuoides
- Serpula papyracea
- Serpula pinastri
- Serpula porinoides
- Serpula pulverulenta
- Serpula romellii
- Serpula rufa
- Serpula rugospora
- Serpula sclerotiorum
- Serpula serpens
- Serpula similis
- Serpula sororia
- Serpula squalida
- Serpula terrestris
- Serpula tignicola
- Serpula umbrina
