= Pulvinic acid =

Names
- IUPAC name (2E)-(5-Hydroxy-3-oxo-4-phenyl-2(3H)-furanylidene)(phenyl)acetic acid

Identifiers
CAS Number	26548-70-9
3D model (JSmol)	Interactive image
ChemSpider	2299472
PubChem CID	3035166
UNII	Q17C0F3Z5W
- InChI: InChI=1S/C18H12O5/c19-15-13(11-7-3-1-4-8-11)18(22)23-16(15)14(17(20)21)12-9-5-2-6-10-12/h1-10,22H,(H,20,21)/b16-14+ Key: WFZQEWXZFDGFEP-JQIJEIRASA-N; InChI=1/C18H12O5/c19-15-13(11-7-3-1-4-8-11)18(22)23-16(15)14(17(20)21)12-9-5-2-6-10-12/h1-10,22H,(H,20,21)/b16-14+ Key: WFZQEWXZFDGFEP-JQIJEIRABX
- SMILES: O=C(O)C(=C2/OC(/O)=C(/c1ccccc1)C2=O)/c3ccccc3

Properties
Chemical formula	C_{18}H_{12}O_{5}
Molar mass	308.289 g·mol^{−1}
- Except where otherwise noted, data are given for materials in their standard state (at 25 °C [77 °F], 100 kPa). Infobox references

Pulvinic acids are natural chemical pigments found in some lichens, derived biosynthetically from the aromatic amino acids phenylalanine and tyrosine, via dimerization and oxidative ring-cleavage of arylpyruvic acids, a process that also produces the related pulvinones.

Hydroxypulvinic acid pigments (pulvinic acid type family of pigments) have been found in Boletus (e.g. Boletus erythropus), Boletinus, Chalciporus, Gyrodon, Leccinum, Suillus (e.g. Suillus luteus, Suillus bovinus, and Suillus grevillei), Paxillus (e.g. Paxillus involutus), Serpula (e.g. Serpula lacrymans), Xerocomus (e.g. Xerocomus chrysenteron), Hygrophoropsis (e.g. Hygrophoropsis aurantiaca), Retiboletus (e.g. Retiboletus nigerrimus), Pulveroboletus (e.g. Pulveroboletus auriflammeus), and are generally characteristic of Boletales. In addition to pulvinone, derivatives and related pigments of this family include atromentic acid, xerocomic acid, isoxerocomic acid, variegatic acid, variegatorubin, xerocomorubin, chinomethide, methyl bovinate, badion A, norbadion A, bisnorbadiochinone A, pisochinone, and sclerocitrin. More complex dimers of the pulvinic acid dimer (dimers of dimers) have been found in the fungi Scleroderma citrinum and Chalciporus piperatus.
