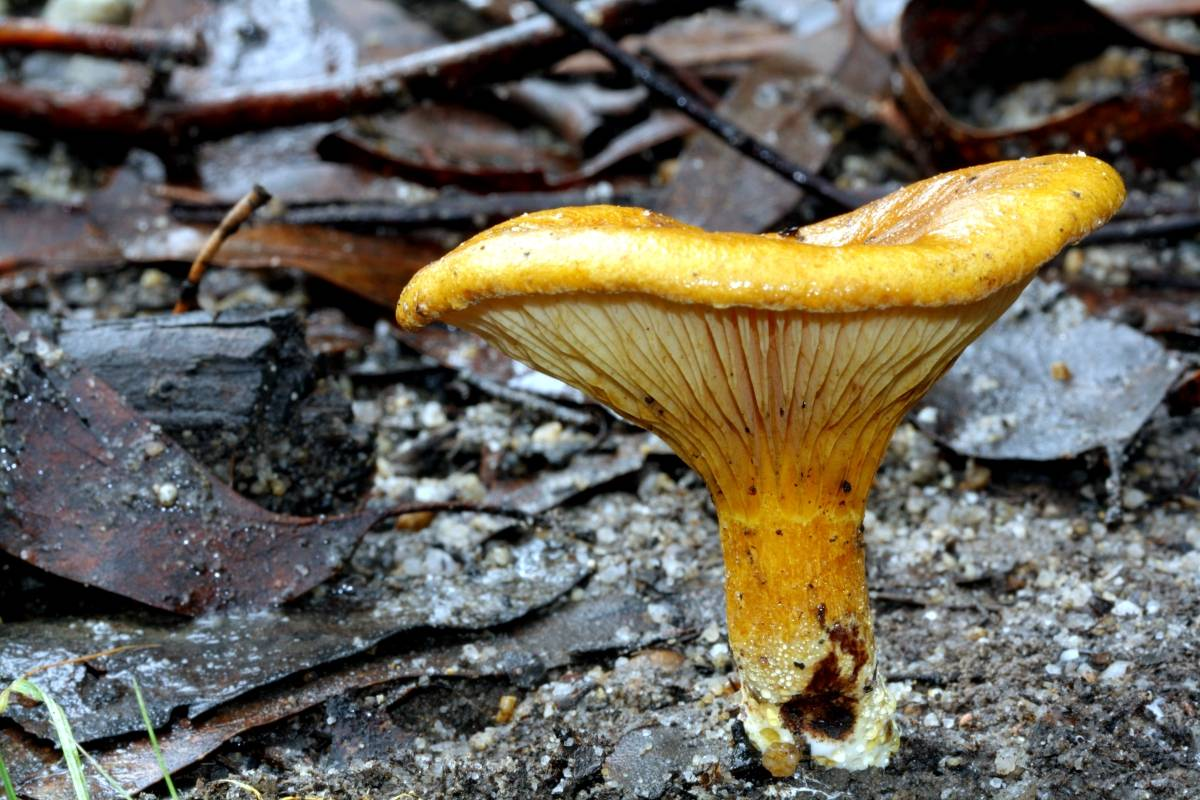

Scientific classification
- Domain: Eukaryota
- Kingdom: Fungi
- Division: Basidiomycota
- Class: Agaricomycetes
- Order: Boletales
- Family: Serpulaceae
- Genus: Austropaxillus
- Species: A. infundibuliformis

Binomial name
- Austropaxillus infundibuliformis (Cleland) Bresinsky & Jarosch (1999)

Synonyms
- Paxillus infundibuliformis Cleland (1928); Phylloporus infundibuliformis (Cleland) Singer (1945)

= Austropaxillus infundibuliformis =

Species of fungus

Austropaxillus infundibuliformis (formerly Paxillus infundibuliformis) is a species of fungus in the family Serpulaceae. A mycorrhizal species, it grows in the eucalypt forests of southeastern Australia. It is readily recognised by its tawny yellow colour, large size (relative to other Australian mushrooms) and forked decurrent gills.

== Taxonomy ==
The species was first described in 1927 by Australian mycologist John Burton Cleland as Paxillus infundibuliformis. The initial specimens were found in Kuitpo Forest, Mount Lofty, Mount Sedgwick, and near Bendigo. Rolf Singer's 1945 Phylloporus infundibuliformis is a synonym. It was given its current name in 1999 when Andreas Bresinsky and colleagues, studying the genus Paxillus, determined that several Southern Hemisphere species were found to be in a lineage that is most closely related to the brown rot genus Serpula.

== Description ==
Austropaxillus infundibuliformis is readily identified by its large size (for an Australian mushroom), colour and gills. The cap is convex to flattened and features an inrolled margin when it is young; it grows to diameters of up to 6.5 cm (2.6 in). As it matures, it develops a central depression and becomes funnel shape, and the margin becomes wavy and folded. The cap colour ranges from yellow brown to dark brown, while the surface is dry and felt-like, sometimes developing small cracks in age. The closely spaced, pale cream to pale yellow-brown gills are decurrent and interspersed with lamellulae (short gills). Gills are shallow (up to 4 mm deep), have a smooth edge, and are multiply forked. They can be readily removed from the flesh of the cap. The stipe measures up to 4.7 cm (1.9 in) long by 1.7 cm (0.7 in) thick. Yellowish with a lighter shading near its base, it bruises dark brown where it has been injured or handled. The flesh has no distinctive odour and a bitter taste. The spore print is brown, while spores are somewhat fuse-shaped, thick-walled, and measure 11–13 by 5–6 μm.

== Habitat and distribution ==
Found across southern Australia with records from Western Australia to Victoria and New South Wales, Austropaxillus infundibuliformis is a mycorrhizal species, and fruits on the ground in eucalypt forests, such as Eucalyptus obliqua.

Watling and colleagues examined a specimen regarded as A. infundibuliformis from Mount Field in Tasmania and found it to have smaller spores and paler gills.
