= C18H12O8 =

The molecular formula C_{18}H_{12}O_{8} (molar mass: 356.28 g/mol, exact mass: 356.0532 u) may refer to:

- Grevilline C
- Grevilline D
- Isoxerocomic acid
- Xerocomic acid
