= C18H10O8 =

The molecular formula C_{18}H_{10}O_{8} (molar mass: 354.27 g/mol, exact mass: 354.0376 u) may refer to:

- Cyclovariegatin
- Xerocomorubin
