= Chrysothrix chrysophthalma =

Conservation status
- Apparently Secure (NatureServe)

Scientific classification
- Domain: Eukaryota
- Kingdom: Fungi
- Division: Ascomycota
- Class: Arthoniomycetes
- Order: Arthoniales
- Family: Chrysotrichaceae
- Genus: Chrysothrix
- Species: C. chrysophthalma

Binomial name
- Chrysothrix chrysophthalma (P.James) P.James & J.R.Laundon (1981)

Synonyms
- Micarea chrysophthalma P.James (1971)

Species of lichen

Chrysothrix chrysophthalma is a species of leprose lichen in the family Chrysotrichaceae. It occurs in Europe, where it grows on decaying wood and the bark of coniferous and deciduous trees in well-lit habitats.

== Taxonomy ==
Chrysothrix chrysophthalma was originally described as Micarea chrysophthalma by the lichenologist Peter James in 1971, based on a specimen collected in Coulin Forest, Scotland. It was later transferred to the genus Chrysothrix by James and Jack Laundon due to the similarity in internal apothecial structures shared with other species in the genus, notably the branched and interconnected paraphyses and similarly structured spores. The species epithet chrysophthalma, which means "golden-eyed", alludes to the color of its apothecia.

== Description ==
Chrysothrix chrysophthalma features an immersed thallus, usually presenting as a subtle, pale greyish stain. Often, only the reproductive structures (apothecia) or powdery soredia are visible on the surface. The soredia are typically bright yellow-green, finely powdery, and sometimes form extensive patches. The algae partner consists of spherical green algae cells grouped singly or in small clusters.

Apothecia, when present, are small (up to 0.9 mm), rounded, convex or spherical, and lack distinct margins. Their colors range from yellow to greenish-brown, often partially obscured by the powdery soredia. Internally, apothecia contain colorless fungal filaments forming an interconnected layer (epithecium), often densely filled with small crystals. Spores are narrow, clear, typically divided by three cross-walls (septa, and measure 9–15 by 2.5–3 μm.

Chemically, this species contains rhizocarpic acid and an unidentified substance that distinguishes it from similar lichens.

The Australian species Chrysothrix palaeophila is closely related to C. chrysophthalma, with similarities in thallus structure, apothecia colour and form, and ascospore septation and shape; the Australian species is distinguished by the presence of vulpinic acid and the absence of rhizocarpic acid.

== Habitat and distribution ==
Chrysothrix chrysophthalma is known primarily from Europe, including Norway and the British Isles. It occurs at relatively low elevations and prefers strongly acidic substrates. Typically found growing on decaying wood and the bark of coniferous and deciduous trees, sometimes predominantly in the deeply shaded crevices, the species grows in sunny habitats that are largely free from nitrogen pollution. Its presence is especially noticeable in coastal and oceanic climates, where it often forms nearly pure stands, notably on old trunks of Monterey pine in the Isles of Scilly.
