= C18H12O7 =

The molecular formula C_{18}H_{12}O_{7} may refer to:

- Atromentic acid
- Grevilline B
