= Aspulvinone dimethylallyltransferase =

Class of enzymes

aspulvinone dimethylallyltransferase

Identifiers
- EC no.: 2.5.1.35
- CAS no.: 67584-68-3

Databases
- IntEnz: IntEnz view
- BRENDA: BRENDA entry
- ExPASy: NiceZyme view
- KEGG: KEGG entry
- MetaCyc: metabolic pathway
- PRIAM: profile
- PDB structures: RCSB PDB PDBe PDBsum
- Gene Ontology: AmiGO / QuickGO
Search
- PMC: articles
- PubMed: articles
- NCBI: proteins

In enzymology, an aspulvinone dimethylallyltransferase (EC 2.5.1.35) is an enzyme that catalyzes the chemical reaction

2 dimethylallyl diphosphate + aspulvinone E $\rightleftharpoons$ 2 diphosphate + aspulvinone H

Thus, the two substrates of this enzyme are dimethylallyl diphosphate and aspulvinone E, whereas its two products are diphosphate and aspulvinone H.

This enzyme belongs to the family of transferases, specifically those transferring aryl or alkyl groups other than methyl groups. The systematic name of this enzyme class is dimethylallyl-diphosphate:aspulvinone-E dimethylallyltransferase. This enzyme is also called dimethylallyl pyrophosphate:aspulvinone dimethylallyltransferase.
