= Chrysothrix palaeophila =

Scientific classification
- Domain: Eukaryota
- Kingdom: Fungi
- Division: Ascomycota
- Class: Arthoniomycetes
- Order: Arthoniales
- Family: Chrysotrichaceae
- Genus: Chrysothrix
- Species: C. palaeophila

Binomial name
- Chrysothrix palaeophila Kantvilas & Elix (2007)

Species of lichen

Chrysothrix palaeophila is a rare species of corticolous (bark-dwelling) lichen in the family Chrysotrichaceae. It is endemic to Tasmania, Australia. The lichen grows in bark fissures that rarely have other lichens. It has an immersed thallus that slightly bleaches the bark it grows on, and tiny apothecia (fruiting bodies) that are densely covered with yellow to yellow-green pruina.

== Taxonomy ==
Chrysothrix palaeophila was formally described as a new species in 2007 by the lichenologists Gintaras Kantvilas and John Alan Elix. The type specimen was collected by the first author from Weindorfers Forest, near Cradle Mountain in Tasmania in 1988. The species epithet palaeophila refers to its preference for ancient (Greek, palaeos) trees. It is closely related to C. chrysophthalma, found in the temperate climates of the Northern Hemisphere, but differs primarily in its chemical composition.

== Description ==
The species is characterised by an endophloeodal (immersed) thallus, barely visible as a bleaching of the bark substrate. It has a unicellular green algal photobiont, with their spherical cells dispersed or aggregated in chains. The apothecia of the lichen are scattered, measuring 0.1–0.3 mm wide, convex to more or less spherical in shape, and typically densely covered with yellow to yellow-green pruina. The ascospores are fusiform (spindle-shaped) to ellipsoid, contain three septa, and measure 10–15 by 2.5–4 μm.

Chrysothrix palaeophila contains vulpinic acid as a major secondary metabolite (lichen product), along with pulvinic dilactone in minor or trace amounts.

== Habitat and distribution ==
This species has a restricted distribution, known only from a few collections in Tasmania. It is found in cool temperate rainforest or wet eucalypt forest, predominantly on ancient conifers such as Lagarostrobos franklinii and Athrotaxis selaginoides, as well as on Eucalyptus obliqua. In 2012, Chrysothrix palaeophila, described as "very rare", was known to occur in four locations.

Chrysothrix palaeophila grows in fissures on dry, cracked wood and dry, fibrous bark, which are environments that are typically devoid of other lichens. This cryptic nature suggests it may have been overlooked in other locations. Its growth appears to be restricted to the trunks of ancient trees.
