= Thelephoric acid =

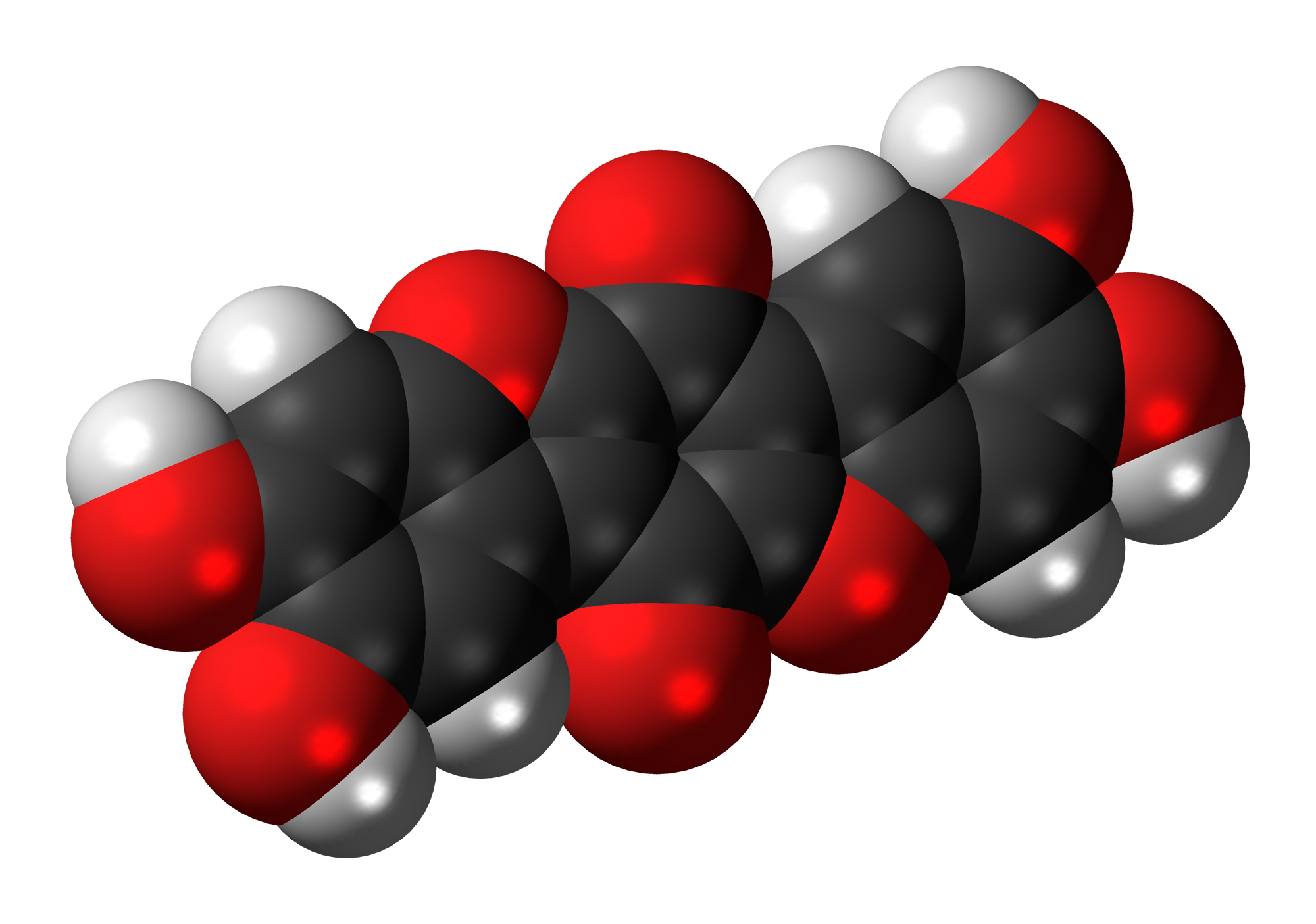

Names
- Preferred IUPAC name 2,3,8,9-Tetrahydroxybenzo[1,2-b:4,5-b′]bis([1]benzofuran)-6,12-dione

Identifiers
CAS Number	479-64-1
3D model (JSmol)	Interactive image
ChEBI	CHEBI:144238
ChEMBL	ChEMBL3236668
ChemSpider	30776833
PubChem CID	135464206
UNII	GGQ7FB8C8B
CompTox Dashboard (EPA)	DTXSID201028792
- InChI: InChI=1S/C18H8O8/c19-7-1-5-11(3-9(7)21)25-17-13(5)15(23)18-14(16(17)24)6-2-8(20)10(22)4-12(6)26-18/h1-4,19-22H Key: PDICCECAPKBDBB-UHFFFAOYSA-N; InChI=1/C18H8O8/c19-7-1-5-11(3-9(7)21)25-17-13(5)15(23)18-14(16(17)24)6-2-8(20)10(22)4-12(6)26-18/h1-4,19-22H Key: PDICCECAPKBDBB-UHFFFAOYAC
- SMILES: c1c2c(cc(c1O)O)oc3c2C(=O)c4c(c5cc(c(cc5o4)O)O)C3=O

Properties
Chemical formula	C_{18}H_{8}O_{8}
Molar mass	352.254 g·mol^{−1}
- Except where otherwise noted, data are given for materials in their standard state (at 25 °C [77 °F], 100 kPa). Infobox references

Thelephoric acid is a terphenylquinone pigment that is found in several fungi, such as Omphalotus subilludens and Polyozellus multiplex. Thelephoric acid has been shown to inhibit prolyl endopeptidase, an enzyme that has a role in processing proteins (specifically, amyloid precursor protein) in Alzheimer's disease. Chemicals that inhibit prolyl endopeptidase have attracted research interest due to their potential therapeutic effects. It is derived from atromentin, and its precursor can be from cyclovariegatin. Fragmentation patterns have suggested that polymers of thelephoric acid exists.
