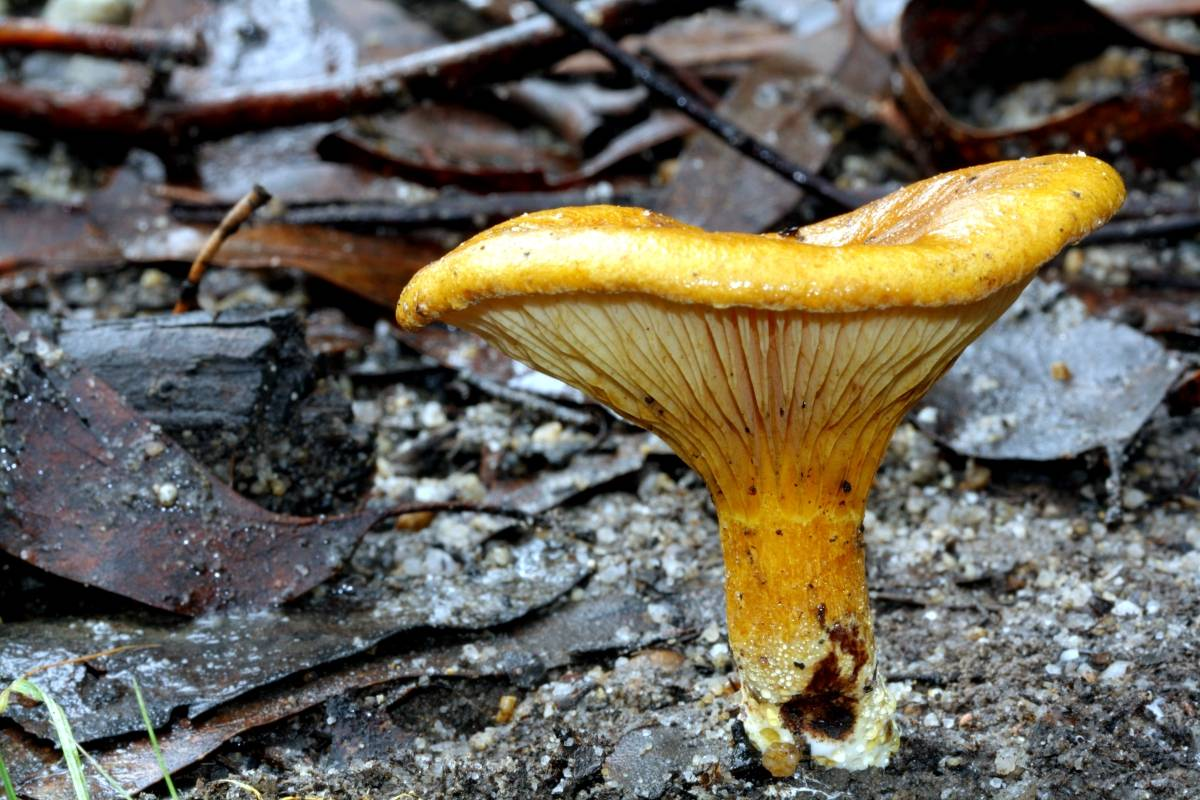
- Austropaxillus infundibuliformis

Scientific classification
- Kingdom: Fungi
- Division: Basidiomycota
- Class: Agaricomycetes
- Order: Boletales
- Family: Serpulaceae
- Genus: Austropaxillus; Bresinsky & Jarosch (1999)

Type species
- Austropaxillus statuum (Speg.) Bresinsky & Jarosch (1999)

Species
- A. boletinoides; A. chilensis; A. contulmensis; A. infundibuliformis; A. macnabbii; A. muelleri; A. nothofagi; A. squarrosus; A. statuum

= Austropaxillus =

Genus of fungi

Austropaxillus is a genus of fungi in the family Serpulaceae, containing nine species found in Australia, New Zealand and South America.

== Taxonomy and naming ==
In 1999, Andreas Bresinsky and colleagues studied the genus Paxillus, which appeared to have a centre of diversity in the Southern Hemisphere as a number of species had been described from Australia, New Zealand, Chile and Argentina in southern South America. Genetic analysis revealed that members of what had been broadly construed as Paxillus fell into three distinct clades. The Southern Hemisphere species were found to be in a lineage that is most closely related to the brown rot genus Serpula. Supporting this is the finding that the compound 2,4,5-trihydroxyphenylglyoxylic acid has been isolated from members of both Austropaxillus and Serpula. Hence they moved these species into the new genus Austropaxillus. Later analysis revealed a relationship to Gymnopaxillus, a small genus of truffle-like fungi known from south-eastern Australia, Argentina, and Chile. Austropaxillus and Gymnopaxillus, both mycorrhizal genera, form a monophyletic clade that is sister to the saprotrophic genus Serpula. Using molecular clock analysis, the split between Austropaxillus and Serpula has been estimated to have occurred about 34.9 mya, roughly coinciding with the separation of South America and Australia from Antarctica.

The prefix Austro is derived from the Latin word auster "south". The type species is Austropaxillus statuum from South America.

== Description ==
Morphologically, the fruit bodies of these fungi resemble those of Paxillus, namely they have funnel-shaped caps with inrolled margins and decurrent gills. In the case of Austropaxillus, the gills are always forked. The spore print is brown. Microscopically they have long spindle-shaped spores from 7.8 to 16 μm long.

== Species ==
According to the Dictionary of the Fungi (10th edition, 2008), the genus contains nine species found in the temperate Southern Hemisphere. Bresinsky and Jarosch defined the species Austropaxillus aurantiacus in their 1999 publication on the genus, but this is not a valid name because it is a homonym of Paxillus aurantiacus published by Job Bicknell Ellis in 1882. It is now known as Austropaxillus macnabbii.

Name	Authority	Year	Basionym	Distribution
A. boletinoides	(Singer) Bresinsky & Jarosch	1999	Paxillus boletinoides Singer (1952)	Argentina, Chile
A. chilensis	(Garrido) Bresinsky & Jarosch	1999	Paxillus chilensis Garrido (1988)	Chile
A. contulmensis	(Garrido) Bresinsky	1999	Paxillus contulmensis Garrido (1988)	Chile
A. infundibuliformis	(Cleland) Bresinsky & Jarosch	1999	Paxillus infundibuliformis Cleland (1927)	Australia
A. macnabbii	(Singer, J. García & L.D. Gómez) Jarosch	2001	Paxillus macnabbi Singer, J.García & L.D.Gómez (1990)	New Zealand
A. muelleri	(Berk.) Bresinsky & Jarosch	1999	Paxillus muelleri Berk. (1873)	Australia
A. nothofagi	(McNabb) Bresinsky & Jarosch	1999	Paxillus nothofagi McNabb (1969)	New Zealand
A. squarrosus	(McNabb) Bresinsky & Jarosch	1999	Paxillus squarrosus McNabb (1969)	New Zealand
A. statuum	(Speg.) Bresinsky & Jarosch	1999	Agaricus staatum Speg. (1888)	Argentina

Cleland described a Paxillus aureus and P. eucalyptorum but no type material or subsequent collections exist.

== Ecology ==
Austropaxillus species form mycorrhizal relationships with trees of the genus Nothofagus and less commonly Eucalyptus.
