= Aspergillus neoafricanus =

Scientific classification
- Kingdom: Fungi
- Division: Ascomycota
- Class: Eurotiomycetes
- Order: Eurotiales
- Family: Aspergillaceae
- Genus: Aspergillus
- Species: A. neoafricanus

Binomial name
- Aspergillus neoafricanus Samson, S.W. Peterson, Frisvad & Varga (2011)

Species of fungus

Aspergillus neoafricanus is a species of fungus in the genus Aspergillus. It is from the Terrei section. The species was first described in 2011. It has been isolated from soil in Ghana, Panama, and Japan. It has been reported to produce aspulvinone, asterriquinone, butyrolactones, citreoviridin, mevinolin, terrain, and terrequinone A.

== Growth and morphology ==
A. neoafricanus has been cultivated on both Czapek yeast extract agar (CYA) plates and Malt Extract Agar Oxoid® (MEAOX) plates. The growth morphology of the colonies can be seen in the pictures below.

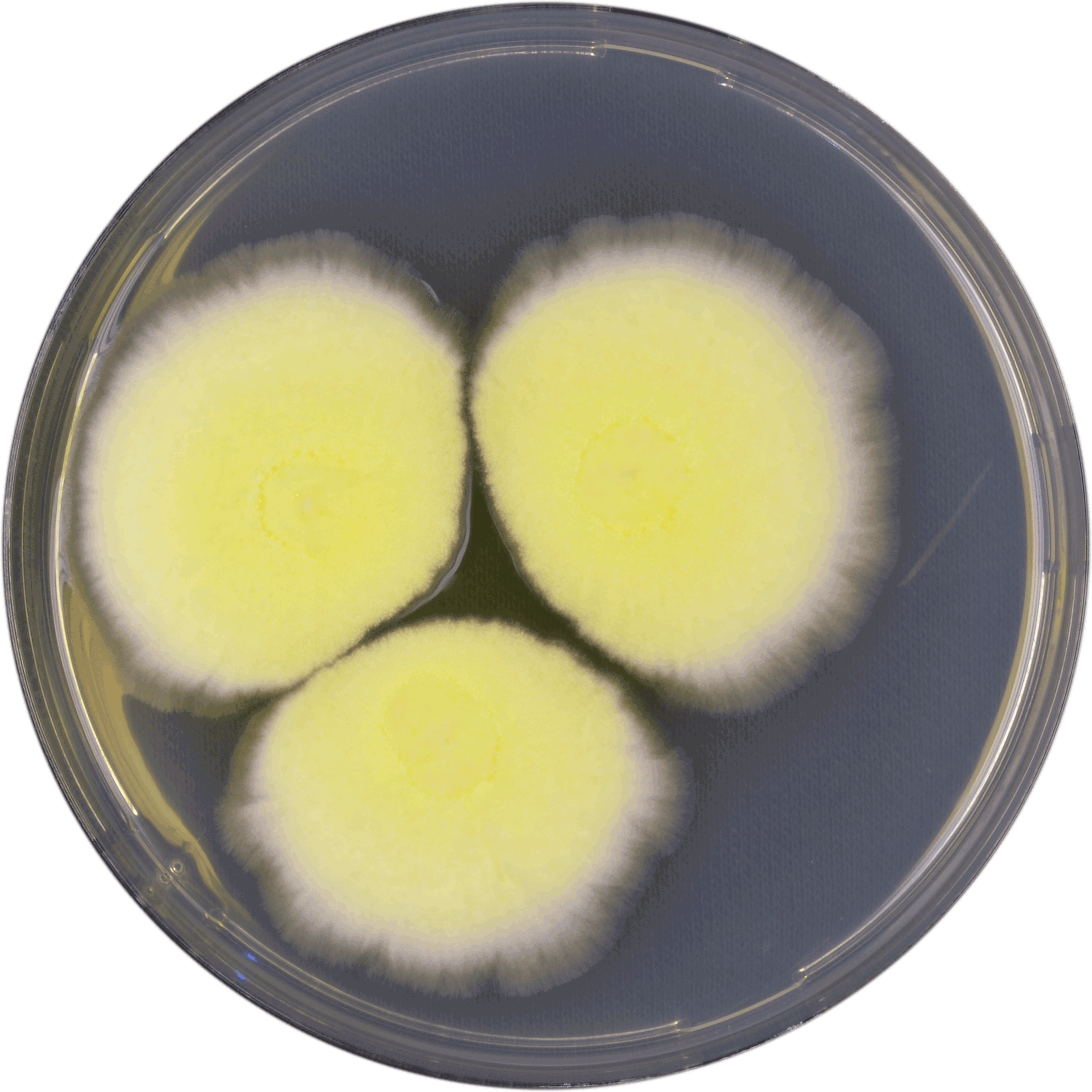
Aspergillus neoafricanus growing on CYA plate

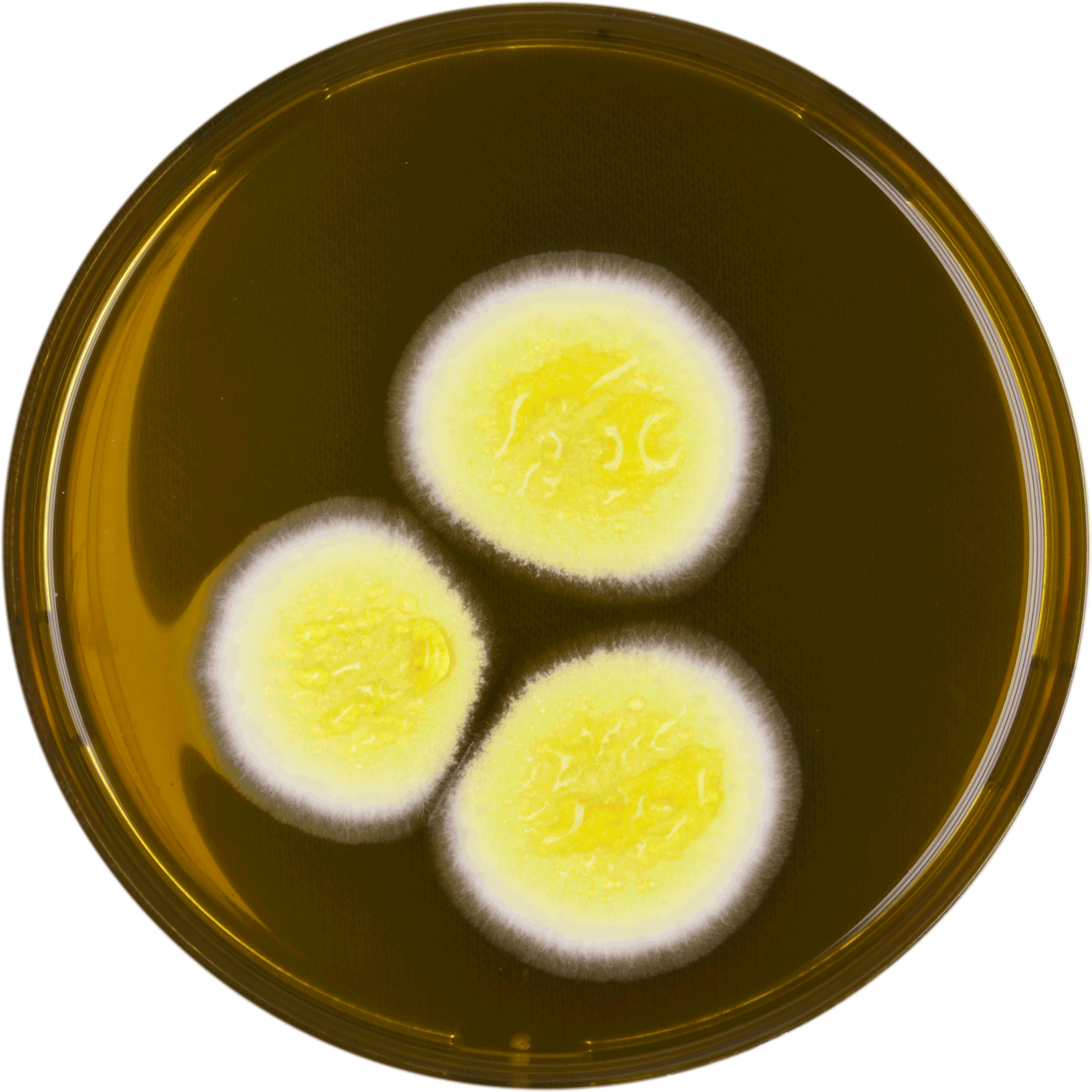
Aspergillus neoafricanus growing on MEAOX plate
