= Terphenylquinones =

Terphenylquinones are fungal dyes from the group of phenyl-substituted p-benzoquinones having the following general structure.

General chemical structure of terphenylquinones

Also derivatives with a central o-benzoquinone structure are known.

== Biosynthesis ==
The biosynthesis of terphenylquinones is carried out by dimerization of substituted oxophenylpropanoic acids (phenylpyruvic acids).

== Occurrence ==
Terphenylquinones are typical constituents of the Boletales.

== Examples ==
Name	Structure	CAS-Nr.	Origin
Polyporic acid	Polyporsäure	548-59-4	Polypore of the order Aphyllophorales, lichen Yarrumia coronata
Atromentin	Atromentin	519-67-5	Paxillus atrotomentosus (Basidiomycota)
Aurantiacin	Aurantiacin	548-32-3	Hydnellum aurantiacum (Basidiomycota)
Phlebiarubron	Phlebiarubron	7204-23-1	Cultures of Phlebia strigosozonata and Punctularia atropurpurascens (Basidiomycota)
Spiromentin B	Spiromentin B	121254-56-6	Tapinella atrotomentosa (Basidiomycota) and cultures of Tapinella panuoides

== See also ==
- Thelephoric acid
