= Pulvinone =

- mixture of cis- and trans-isomers

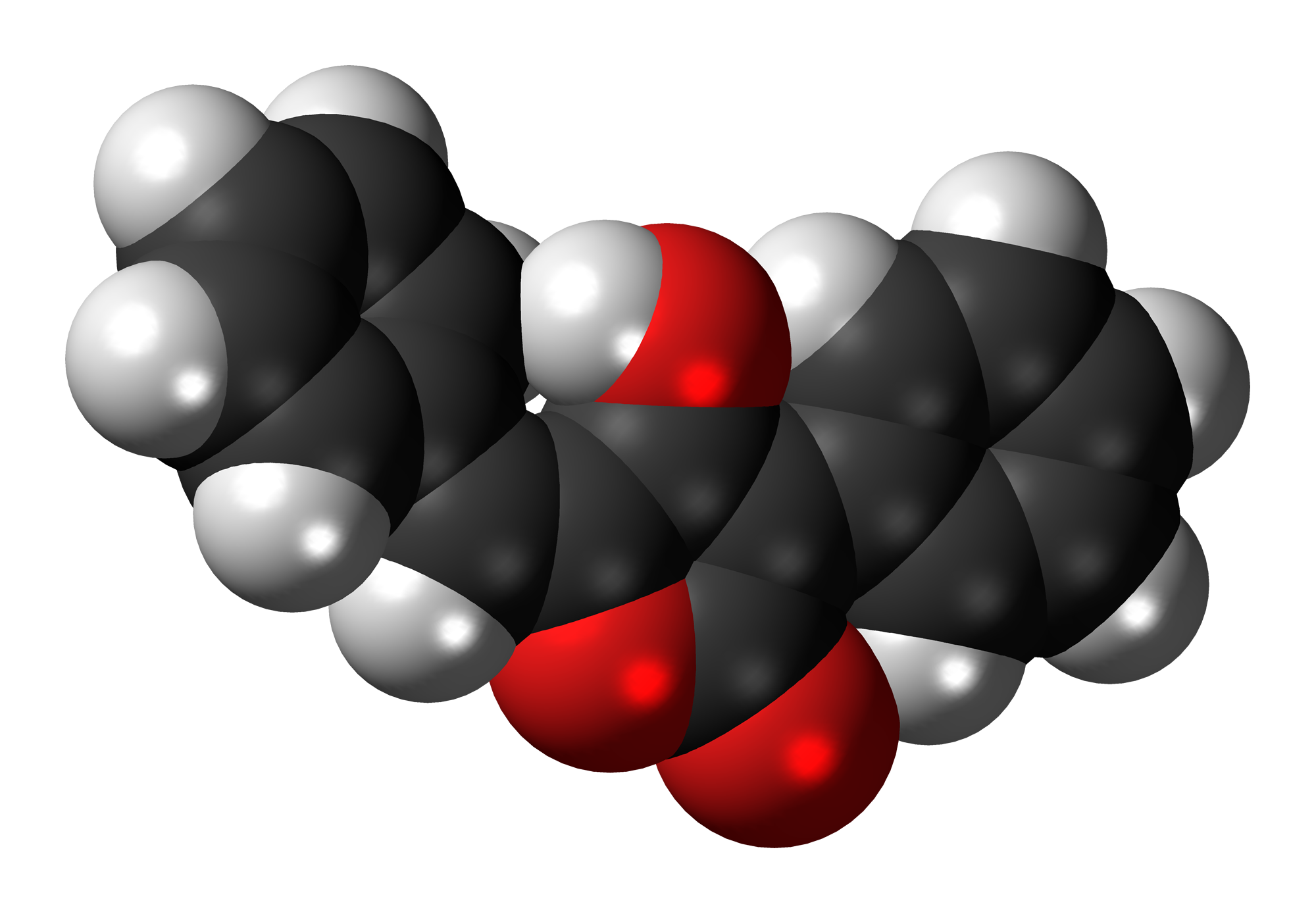
(E)-pulvinone
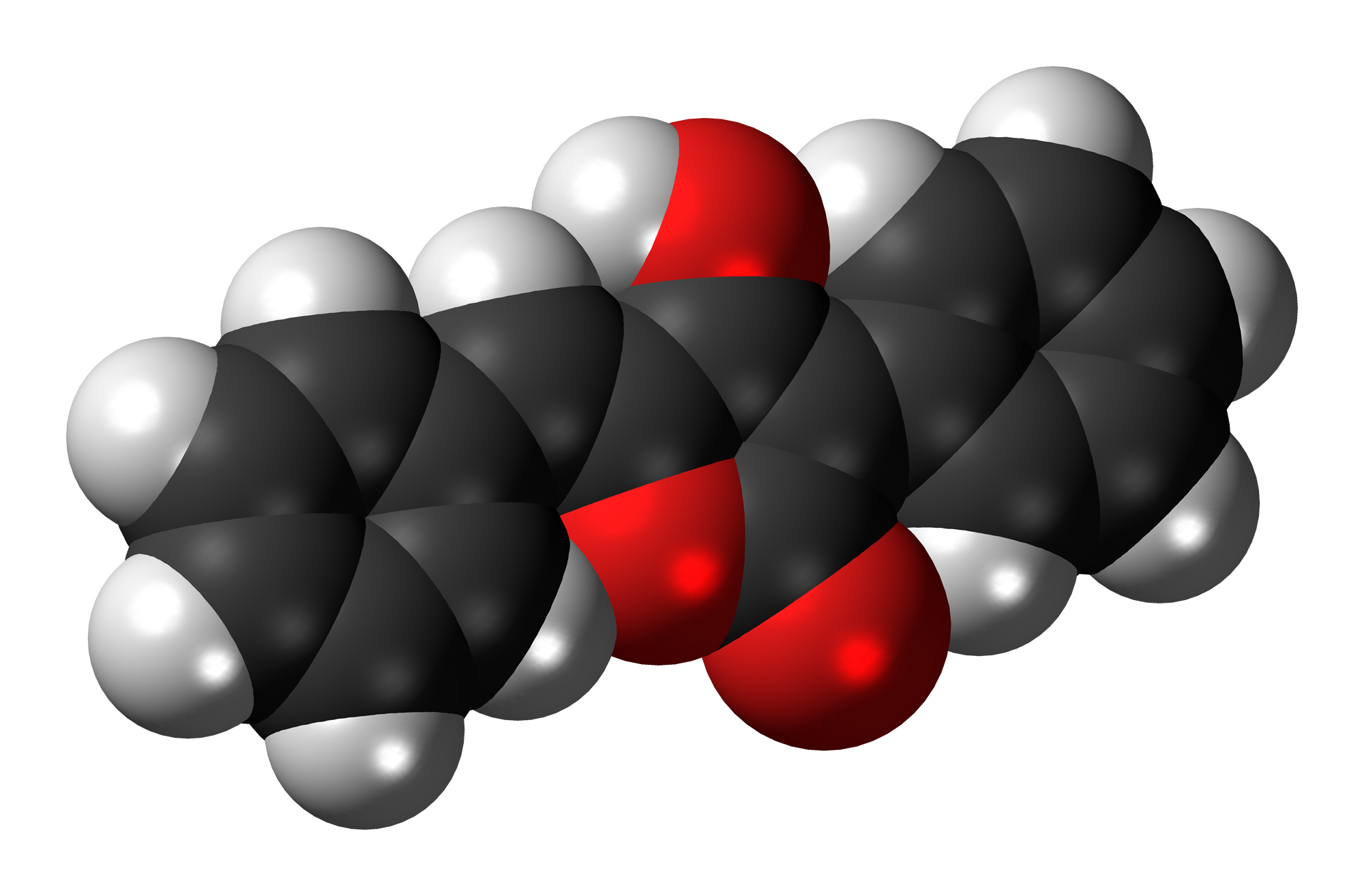
(Z)-pulvinone

Names
- IUPAC name (E/Z)-5-Phenylmethylene-4-hydroxy-3-phenylfuran-2(5H)-one

Identifiers
CAS Number	4941-88-2 (E/Z); (Z): 78376-10-0; (E): 100074-80-4
3D model (JSmol)	(E): Interactive image
ChemSpider	(E): 4513411
PubChem CID	(Z): 54678446; (E): 5358244
UNII	WRB2782R9H
- InChI: Key: KDYDQZMQFZXGPJ-SDNWHVSQSA-N; (E): InChI=1/C17H12O3/c18-16-14(11-12-7-3-1-4-8-12)20-17(19)15(16)13-9-5-2-6-10-13/h1-11,19H/b14-11+ Key: KDYDQZMQFZXGPJ-SDNWHVSQBO
- SMILES: (E): c1ccc(cc1)/C=C/2\C(=O)C(=C(O2)O)c3ccccc3

Properties
Chemical formula	C_{17}H_{12}O_{3}
Molar mass	264.280 g·mol^{−1}
Appearance	Yellow needles
Melting point	243 to 247 °C (469 to 477 °F; 516 to 520 K)
Solubility in water	Insoluble

Related compounds
Related compounds	Pulvinic acid, Vulpinic acid
- Except where otherwise noted, data are given for materials in their standard state (at 25 °C [77 °F], 100 kPa). verify (what is ?) Infobox references

Pulvinone, an organic compound belonging to the esters, lactones, alcohols and butenolides classes, is a yellow crystalline solid. Although the pulvinone is not a natural product, several naturally occurring hydroxylated derivatives are known. These hydroxylated pulvinones are produced by fungal species, such as the in Europe common Larch Bolete (Boletus elegans, also known as Suillus grevillei), or by moulds such as Aspergillus terreus.

== History ==
Fungi (such as boleti), moulds and lichens produce a wide range of pigments made up of one (monomer) or several (oligomers) units of pulvinic acid. In 1831, in the course of a study of the constituents of lichens (Cetraria Vulpina), the French chemist and pharmacist Antoine Bebert discovered a compound named vulpinic acid, the first known naturally occurring methyl ester of pulvinic acid. More details about the structure of this pigment were disclosed in 1860 by the German chemists Franz Möller and Adolph Strecker. While trying to elucidate the structure of vulpinic acid, the German chemist Adolf Spiegel found in 1880 that the vulpinic acid could be saponified to a diacid. He named the resulting diacid pulvinic acid. The German chemist Jacob Volhard elucidated the constitution of pulvinic acid by synthesizing it through the basic hydrolysis of a corresponding dicyanocompound. In the process, he also obtained small amounts of a side-product. One year later Ludwig Claisen and Thomas Ewan achieved the synthesis of this side-product and characterized it as the 5-benzylidene-4-hydroxy-3-phenylfuran-2(5H)-one.

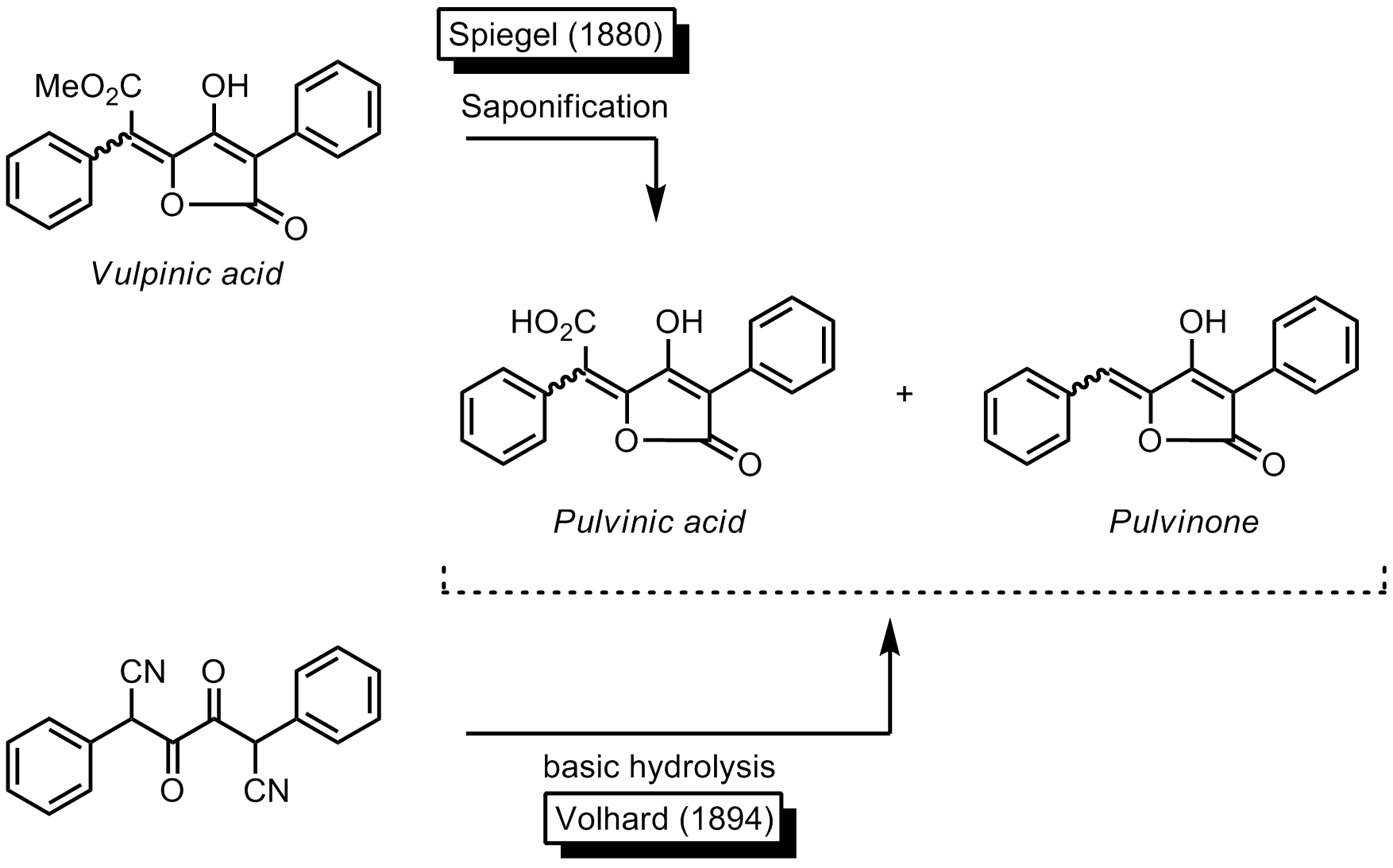
Synthesis of pulvinone from vulpinic acid (Spiegel, top) and from a corresponding dicyanide (Volhard, below)

Claisen and Ewan described it as das der Pulvinsäure zu Grunde liegende Lacton (the lactone underlying the structure of pulvinic acid): that was the origin of the name pulvinone.

== Natural occurrence ==
It was a century after the synthesis of the first pulvinone that the word pulvinone turned into a collective term. In 1973, Edwards and Gill isolated the first naturally occurring hydroxylated pulvinone derivative. This trihydroxylated pulvinone was found as one of the main pigments responsible for the yellow colour of the stem and caps of the European mushroom Larch Bolete (Boletus elegans, also known as Suillus grevillei). In the very same year 1973, Seto and coworkers also found hydroxylated pulvinones in cultures of the mould Aspergillus terreus. To insist on their origin - and thereby differentiate them from the hydroxylated pulvinones found in Suillus grevillei - Seto and coworkers named these compounds Aspulvinones. The aspulvinone terminology also incorporates a letter, indicating the order of chromatographic elution of these compounds (hence, the least polar aspulvinone was named Aspulvinone A, the one eluting next Aspulvinone B, etc...).

Like many other yellow pigments in fungi and lichens, pulvinones can be traced back from the pulvinic acid pathway. The pulvinone structural unit is found in a number of natural products. All monomeric (such as pulvinic acid itself, vulpinic acid, comphidic acid, the aspulvinones and the Kodaistatins) or oligomeric (Badiones, Norbadione, Aurantricholon) derivatives of the pulvinic acid contain the pulvinone structural element. So far, all naturally occurring pulvinone derivatives were found to be Z-configured.

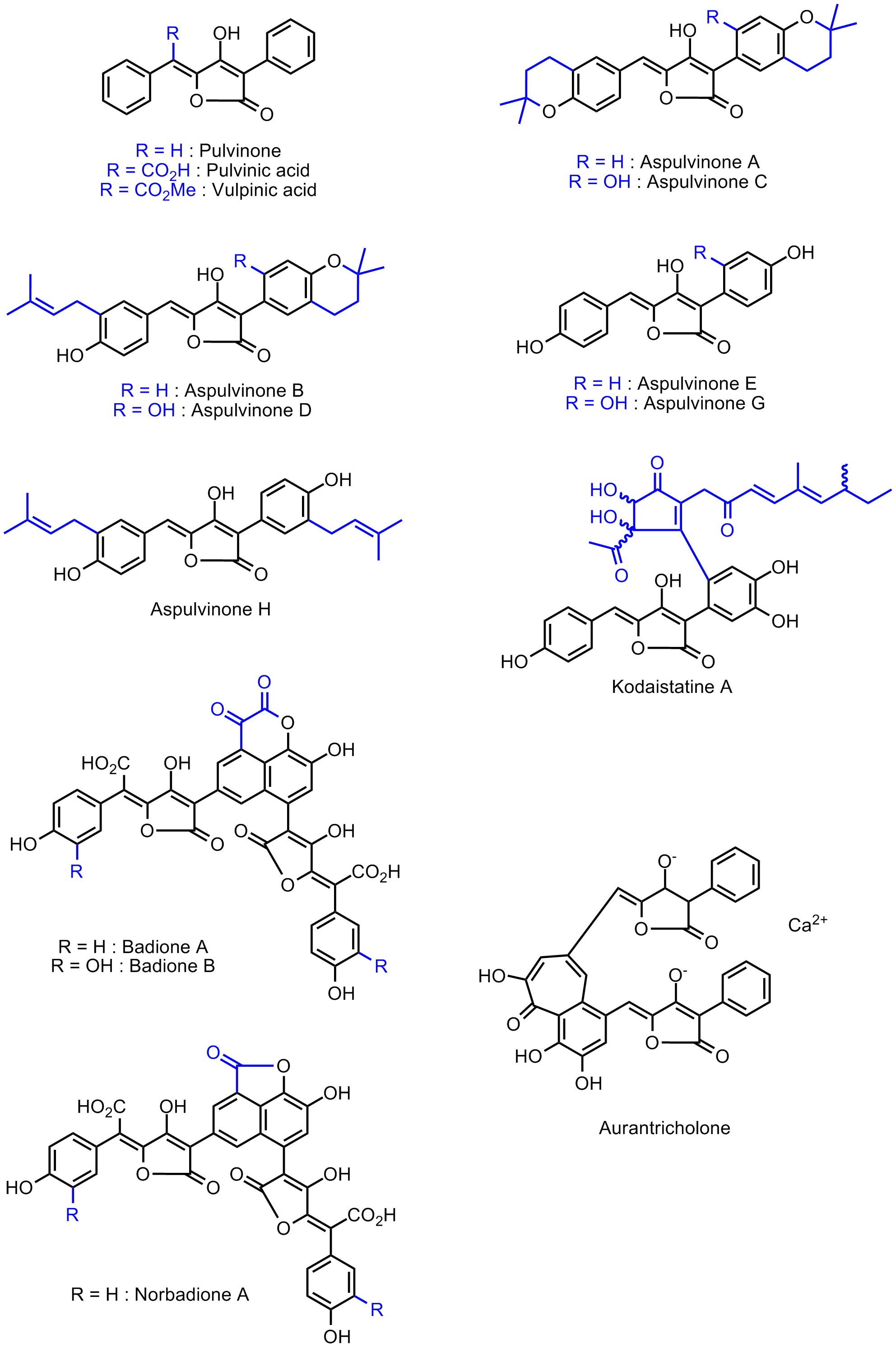
Natural products containing the pulvinone structural unit.

== Pharmacological properties ==
- Rehse et al. showed the anti-coagulant activity of some pulvinones in rats.
- At the beginning of the 80s, the companies ICI and Smith Kline & French patented a large number of derivatives of the vulpinic acid because of their anti-inflammatory, anti-fever and pain-killing properties. Yet vulpinic acid - as well as many of its derivatives - is a cytotoxic compound. Since pulvinones exhibit a lower cytotoxicity compared to vulpinic acid and its derivatives, Organon investigated the pharmaceutical potential of more than 100 pulvinones. To date, the results of these studies were not fully disclosed.
- In 2005, the Wyeth company patented biphenyl-substituted pulvinones due to their promising activity against Gram-positive bacteria, including otherwise resistant bacteria. However, pulvinone-based antibiotics were so far only patented for animal use.

== Chemical properties ==
Pulvinone is a lactone, more precisely an intramolecular ester of the trans-1,4-diphenyl-2,3-dihydroxy-1,3-butadiene-1-carboxylic acid, from which it can be prepared through removal of one equivalent of water:

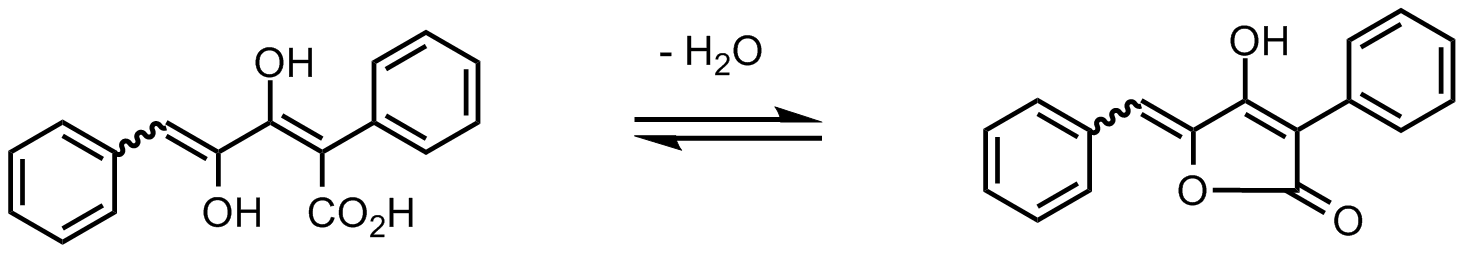
Preparation of pulvinone (lactone) from the corresponding carboxylic acid

The central 5-membered ring core of pulvinone reveals a 4-hydroxy-butenolide structure. They are essentially found in their enol form, which exhibits acidic properties due to the relative lability of the hydroxylic proton. 4-hydroxy-butenolides such as pulvinones are therefore referred to as tetronic acids, and belong to the larger category of vinylogous acids.

== Biosynthesis ==
The fungal biosynthesis starts from aromatic aminoacids such as phenylalanine and tyrosine; after oxydeamination to the corresponding arylpyruvic acid, the pulvinone skeleton is formed by a sequence of dimerisation, oxidative ring-cleavage and decarboxylation.

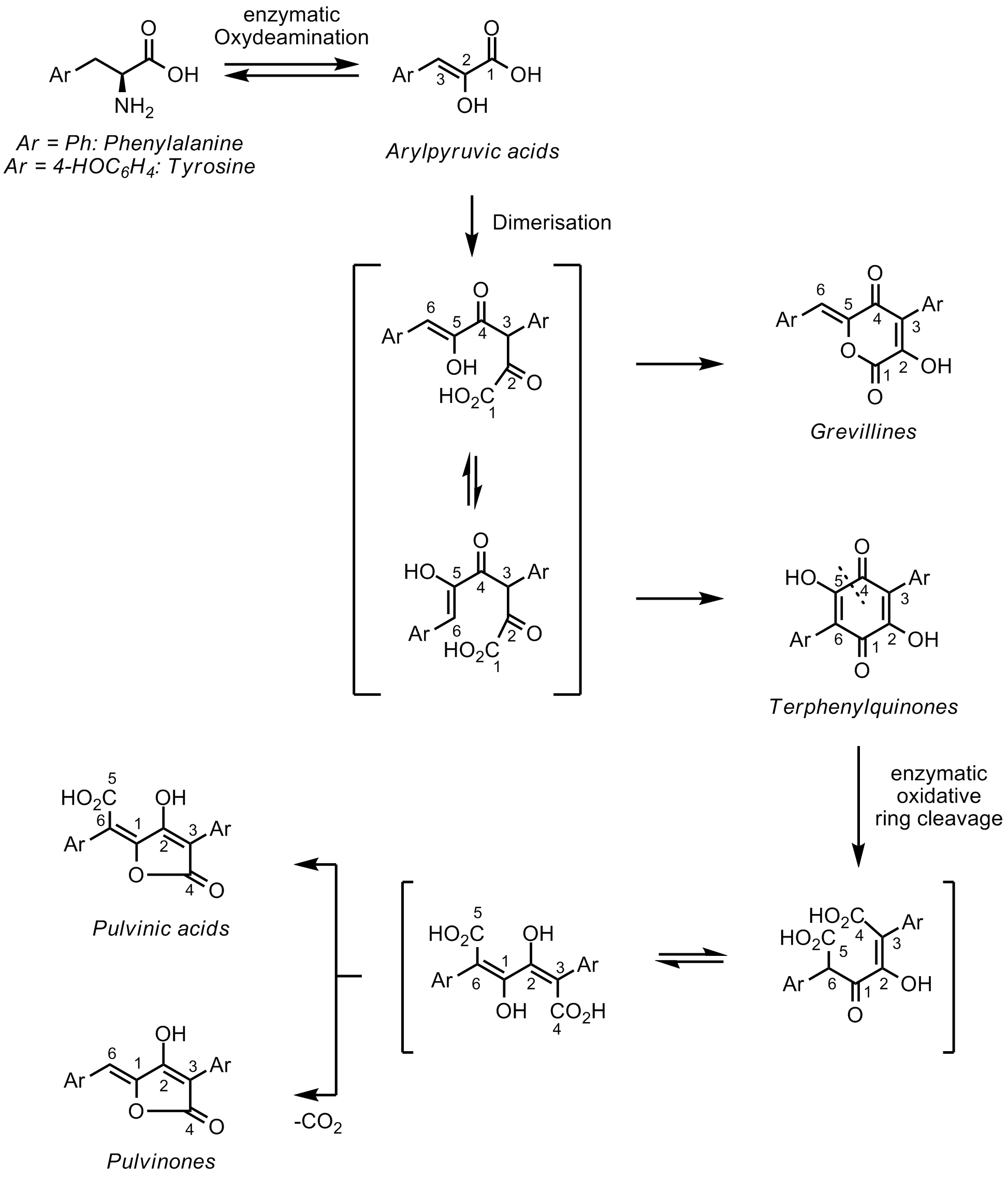
Suggested biogenetic relationship between the aromatic aminoacids phenylalanine and tyrosine, the corresponding arylpyruvic acids, and the fungal pigments grevillines, terphenylquinones, pulvinic acids, and pulvinones.

== Total synthesis ==
Jacob Volhard was the first to synthesise vulpinic acid, pulvinic acid and pulvinone. To date, 11 total syntheses of pulvinones were reported:

- 1895 by Claisen and Ewan,
- 1975 and 1979 by Knight and Pattenden,
- 1979 by Jerris, Wovkulich and Amos B. Smith III,
- 1984 by Ramage et al.,
- 1985 by Campbell et al.,
- 1990 by Gill et al.,
- 1991 by Pattenden, Turvill and Chorlton,
- 2005 by Caufield et al.,
- 2006 by Antane et al.,
- 2007 by Kaczybura and Brückner,
- 2007 by Bernier, Moser and Brückner.

== See also ==
- Pulvinic acid
- Variegatic acid
- Vulpinic acid
