= Variegatic acid =

Names
- Preferred IUPAC name (E)-(3,4-Dihydroxyphenyl)[4-(3,4-dihydroxyphenyl)-3-hydroxy-5-oxofuran-2(5H)-ylidene]acetic acid
- Other names 3,3′,4,4′-Tetrahydroxy pulvinic acid

Identifiers
| CAS Number | 20988-30-1; 15404-65-6 (non-specific) |
| 3D model (JSmol) | Interactive image |
| ChemSpider | 74025443 |
| PubChem CID | 101967051 |
| UNII | C7PLL5BF8H |
| CompTox Dashboard (EPA) | DTXSID301045343 |
- InChI: InChI=1S/C18H12O9/c19-9-3-1-7(5-11(9)21)13-15(23)16(27-18(13)26)14(17(24)25)8-2-4-10(20)12(22)6-8/h1-6,19-23H,(H,24,25)/b16-14+ Key: MRRYHTCWZKZVIH-JQIJEIRASA-N
- SMILES: O=C(C(C1=CC(O)=C(O)C=C1)=C/2O)OC2=C(C(O)=O)/C3=CC(O)=C(O)C=C3

Properties
| Chemical formula | C_{18}H_{12}O_{9} |
| Molar mass | 372.285 g·mol^{−1} |
- Except where otherwise noted, data are given for materials in their standard state (at 25 °C [77 °F], 100 kPa). Infobox references

Variegatic acid (3,3',4,4'-tetrahydroxypulvinic acid) is an orange pigment found in some mushrooms. It is responsible for the bluing reaction seen in many bolete mushrooms when they are injured. When mushroom tissue containing variegatic acid is exposed to air, the chemical is enzymatically oxidized to blue-colored quinone methide anions It is derived from xerocomic acid, which is preceded by atromentic acid and atromentin, but the full biosynthetic pathway is unknown. In its oxidized form (due to the production of a second lactone ring) is variegatorubin, similar to xerocomorubin.

It was first isolated from Suillus variegatus, and a total synthesis that uses a Suzuki cross coupling reaction was reported in 2001. It has strong antioxidant properties, and appears part of S. variegatus' Fenton chemistry-based saprobic attack on dead plant matter, catalyzing the reduction of Fe^{3+}.

Variegatic acid has a nonspecific inhibitory effect on cytochrome P450 enzymes. It was found antibiotically inactive against an array of bacteria and fungi using the disk diffusion assay at 50 μg. However, at similar concentrations it was found to inhibit swarming and (probably consequently) biofilm formation of Bacillus subtilis.

== Derivatives ==
Variegatic acid methyl ester, 3-O-methylvariegatic acid methyl ester, and 3,3',4,4'-tetra-O-methylvariegatic acid methyl ester are red-orange pigments found in Boletales.

Variegatic acid methyl ester

3-O-Methylvariegatic acid methyl ester

3,3',4,4'-Tetra-O-methyl variegatic acid methyl ester

== See also ==
- Pulvinic acid
- Pulvinone
- Vulpinic acid
