= Isoxerocomic acid =

Names
- Preferred IUPAC name (E)-(3,4-Dihydroxyphenyl)[3-hydroxy-4-(4-hydroxyphenyl)-5-oxofuran-2(5H)-ylidene]acetic acid

Identifiers
CAS Number	27711-61-1
3D model (JSmol)	Interactive image
ChemSpider	129557841
PubChem CID	102235612
CompTox Dashboard (EPA)	DTXSID301337190
- InChI: InChI=1S/C18H12O8/c19-10-4-1-8(2-5-10)13-15(22)16(26-18(13)25)14(17(23)24)9-3-6-11(20)12(21)7-9/h1-7,19-22H,(H,23,24)/b16-14+ Key: LTTYWERVHIDGQN-JQIJEIRASA-N
- SMILES: OC(=O)C(=C1\OC(=O)C(=C1O)C1=CC=C(O)C=C1)\C1=CC=C(O)C(O)=C1

Properties
Chemical formula	C_{18}H_{12}O_{8}
Molar mass	356.2831
Melting point	295 °C (563 °F; 568 K)
- Except where otherwise noted, data are given for materials in their standard state (at 25 °C [77 °F], 100 kPa). Infobox references

Isoxerocomic acid is a red-orange pigment found in Boletales. It is the precursor to variegatic acid, and is preceded by atromentic acid and atromentin. As an example, it is isolated from Serpula lacrymans. It is soluble in methanol. It is the isomer of xerocomic acid and precursor to xerocomorubin.
