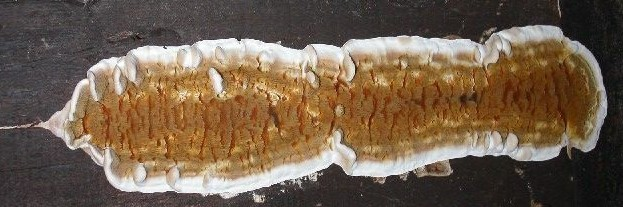
- Serpula lacrymans

Scientific classification
- Kingdom: Fungi
- Division: Basidiomycota
- Class: Agaricomycetes
- Order: Boletales
- Family: Serpulaceae
- Genus: Serpula (Pers.) Gray (1821)

Type species
- Serpula destruens (Pers.) Gray (1821)

Species
- See text

Synonyms
- Merulius sect. Serpula Pers. (1801); Xylophagous Link (1809); Xylomyzon Pers. (1825); Gyrophora Pat. (1874); Gyrophana Pat. (1897)

= Serpula (fungus) =

Genus of fungi

Serpula is a genus of fungi in the family Serpulaceae.

== Taxonomy and evolution ==
The term was originally defined by Christiaan Hendrik Persoon as a section of the genus Merulius in 1801. British botanist Samuel Frederick Gray raised it to genus status in his 1821 work The Natural Arrangement of British Plants. The name is derived from the Latin verb serpěre "to creep". Synonyms include Johann Heinrich Friedrich Link's 1809 Xylophagous, Christian Hendrik Persoon's 1825 Xylomyzon, Narcisse Théophile Patouillard's 1874 Gyrophora, and Patouillard's 1897 Gyrophana.

Serpula forms a clade with at least two other closely related genera, Austropaxillus and Gymnopaxillus, the three composing the family Serpulaceae. It is thought that the common ancestor was saprotrophic, and that ancestor to the latter two genera became mycorrhizal. Using molecular clock analysis, the split between Austropaxillus and Serpula has been estimated to have occurred about 34.9 mya, roughly coinciding with the separation of South America and Australia from Antarctica.

The number of species is uncertain – the two species S. lacrymans and S. himantioides have been considered to be a single species, or the latter species has possibly five cryptic species within its complex.

== Description ==
The members of the genus Serpula form flat brown fruit bodies that cover the surface they are growing on (known as the substrate). The hymenophore, or spore-forming surface, generally has a wrinkled appearance.

== Ecology ==
The species grow on, and digest, mainly coniferous wood, causing a process known as brown rot. One species, dry rot (S. lacrymans), is a highly destructive agent of houses. Damp structural timber is an ideal substrate for the germination of Serpula spores. The fungal hyphae penetrate the wood and release enzymes that break down structural polysaccharides such as cellulose. There may be no external indications that the fungus is present until the rot is far advanced and fruit bodies are formed. The strand mycelium of Serpula, which can be up to 8 mm thick, are invasive and can spread over non-nutritive surfaces to find new food sources, even spreading through pores in stone, brickwork, and cement. After its initial growth period, the fungus can produce the water it needs and can continue growth into dry timber, eventually degrading it to powder—hence the term "dry rot". S. lacrymans is the most serious cause of building timber decay in the UK and northern Europe.

== Species ==
The Dictionary of the Fungi (10th edition, 2008), suggests that the genus contains two species. As of October 2024, the nomenclatural database Catalogue of Life indicates 15 species:

- S. atrovirens
- S. byssoidea
- S. costaricensis
- S. crassa
- S. dendrocalami
- S. erecta
- S. eurocephala
- S. fuscescens
- S. himantioides
- S. lacrymans
- S. olivacea
- S. sclerotiorum
- S. similis
- S. tignicola
- S. umbrina
