= Atromentin =

- Structural formula of atromentin

Names
- Preferred IUPAC name 1^{4},2^{3},2^{6},3^{4}-Tetrahydroxy[1^{1},2^{1}:2^{4},3^{1}-terphenyl]-2^{2},2^{5}-dione
- Other names 2,5-Dihydroxy-3,6-bis(4-hydroxyphenyl)-1,4-benzoquinone

Identifiers
CAS Number	519-67-5
3D model (JSmol)	Interactive image
ChEBI	CHEBI:149660
ChemSpider	89570
PubChem CID	99148
UNII	59557692U6
CompTox Dashboard (EPA)	DTXSID60199863
- InChI: InChI=1S/C18H12O6/c19-11-5-1-9(2-6-11)13-15(21)17(23)14(18(24)16(13)22)10-3-7-12(20)8-4-10/h1-8,19-21,24H Key: FKQQKMGWCJGUCS-UHFFFAOYSA-N; InChI=1S/C18H12O6/c19-11-5-1-9(2-6-11)13-15(21)17(23)14(18(24)16(13)22)10-3-7-12(20)8-4-10/h1-8,19-21,24H Key: FKQQKMGWCJGUCS-UHFFFAOYSA-N
- SMILES: C1=CC(=CC=C1C2=C(C(=O)C(=C(C2=O)O)C3=CC=C(C=C3)O)O)O

Properties
Chemical formula	C_{18}H_{12}O_{6}
Molar mass	324.288 g·mol^{−1}
- Except where otherwise noted, data are given for materials in their standard state (at 25 °C [77 °F], 100 kPa). (what is ?) Infobox references

Atromentin is a natural chemical compound found in Agaricomycetes fungi in the orders Agaricales and Thelephorales. It can also be prepared by laboratory synthesis. Chemically, it is a polyphenol and a benzoquinone.

== Occurrences ==
Atromentin has been found in cultures of Clitocybe subilludens and in extracts of Hydnellum peckii. The first enzymes in its biosynthesis have been characterized in Tapinella panuoides. One of those is called atromentin synthetase.

== Biological activities ==
A number of potential biological activities of atromentin have been studied in vitro. Atromentin possesses in vitro antibacterial activity, inhibiting the enzyme enoyl-acyl carrier protein reductase (essential for the biosynthesis of fatty acids) in the bacteria Streptococcus pneumoniae. Atromentin has been shown to be a smooth muscle stimulant. It also induces apoptosis in isolated human leukemia U937 cells. It is also an anticoagulant.

== Genetic and enzymatic basis of atromentin ==
Atromentin is biosynthesized from two units of 4-hydroxyphenylpyruvic acid (4-HPP) via a nonribosomal peptide synthetase-like enzyme (atromentin synthetase), containing the domain architecture adenylation-thiolation-thioesterase (A-T-TE). 4-HPP is produced from a deamination via an aminotransferase. The genetic basis of these two genes is clustered (i.e., adjacent to one another). These enzymes were first characterized in Tapinella panuoides by overexpressing the respective genes (AtrA and AtrD) in E. coli and incubating the holo-enzyme with 4-HPP to observe the formation of atromentin. This was followed by characterization of the enzyme GreA in Suillus grevillei, six (InvA1-6, of which InvA1, 2 and 5 were functional) in Paxillus involutus, and NPS3 from Serpula lacrymans. In addition, there is another adjacent and conserved gene encoding for an alcohol dehydrogenase/oxidoreductase whose function is unclear. In most cases the clustered biosynthetic genes are found orthologous in basidiomycetes. A common promoter motif was found shared between the atromentin synthetase and aminotransferase of 23 different atromentin-producing basidiomycetes that was in almost all cases absent from the alcohol dehydrogenase, indicating co-regulation of the two essential genes that ensure atromentin production by a common transcription factor. Additional promoter motifs were identified preceding the atromentin genes for ectomycorrihzae that were absent from brown rotters, indicating dissimilar genetic regulation of atromentin. The genes for the atromentin synthetase and aminotransferase from S. lacrymans were up-regulated during co-incubation with bacteria.

== Amino acid nonribosomal code for biosynthesis ==
The nonribosomal peptide synthetase-like enzyme (atromentin synthetase) that symmetrically condenses two monomers of 4-HPP has an adenylation domain that accepts the substrates before catalysis. The acceptor domain contains a 10 amino acid code known as the nonribosomal code (NRPS code). Here, the example of the atromentin synthetase from Suills grevillei, GreA, is used. The code is found at amino acid positions 235 (V), 236 (A), 239 (E), 278 (F), 299 (S), 301 (G), 322 (G), 320 (A), 331 (C), 517 (K). The code aligns with atromentin synthetases from S. lacrymans (NPS3), Tapinella panuoides (AtrA), and Paxillus involutus (InvAs). Similarly, the NRPS code for atromentin production supports the universal code for other aromatic alpha-keto acid-derived compounds, such those from L-phenylalanine like ralfuranone B via phenylpyruvic acid, and from L-tryptophane like didemethyl asterriquinone D via indole-3-pyruvic acid (note atromentin is derived from the aromatic alpha-keto acid L-tyrosine via 4-hydroxyphenylpyruvic acid).

For InvAs from Paxillus involutus, a common amino acid motif was also found in the thioesterase domain (last domain) that supported biochemical data of either the enzyme being functional to complete atromentin formation or not.

== Biosynthesis of atromentin ==
The aromatic amino acid L-tyrosine is the precursor to 4-hydroxyphenylpyruvic acid, and 2 units of 4-HPP are condensed to form atromentin. The initial step is deamination via an aminotransferase. The second step is catalyzed by a nonribosomal peptide synthetase-like enzyme (NRPS-like, because it does not have a canonical condensation domain, called the atromentin/quinone synthetase). The adenylation domain of this NRPS-like enzyme accepts 4-HPP as determined by the ATP-PPi-exchange assay. The enzyme, when produced in E. coli, needs to be primed to its holo form via a phosphopantetheinyl transferase (Ppant), although E. coli can in vivo prime the apo-enzyme (e.g. via EntD). Ppants have been successfully used from cDNA derived from A. nidulans (e.g. NpgA), Streptomyces verticillus (Svp), and Paxillus involutus (PptA). A few studies, notably from the bacterium Burkholderia thailandensis by Biggins et al., have shown that the aminotransferase gene may be absent, and this activity can be supplied via its primary metabolism.

== Congener pigments ==
Atromentin is the precursor to various other pigments, including the pulvinic acids such as variegatic acid, xerocomic acid, homoxerocomic acid, isoxerocomic acid, atromentic acid, variegatorubin, xerocomorubin, and other modified derivatives. The main pulvinic acid type pigments were found secreted during co-incubation with bacteria or introduction to high organic nitrogen content (compared to growth on a non-inducing medium containing inorganic nitrogen). Diarylcyclopentenones include involutin, involuton, gyrocyanin, gyroporin (oxidized variant of gyrocyanin), anhydroinvolutin, and chamonixin. Although structurally similar, grevillins (A-D) are derived from 4-HPP, the precursor to atromentin. The grevillins are a chemotaxonomic marker for the genus Suillus. Modifications of atromentin include leucoatromentin, leucomentin-3, leucomentin-4, and cylcoleucomelone. Additionally, thelephoric acid is a derivative that is from the thelephoroid clade. The various enzymes involved in the formation of these pigments aside from the genetic and enzymatic basis for the production of its precursor atromentin is unknown.

== Redundant biosynthesis ==
In Paxillus involutus, six nonribosomal peptide synthetase-like enzymes were identified in the annotated genome that is available via the JGI MycoCosm portal. These genes, termed InvA1,2,3,4,5 and 6, were overexpressed in E. coli and the genes were characterized by co-incubating the apo-enzyme with 4-HPP to determine the formation of atromentin as noted by its characteristic UV-Vis spectrum and monoisotopic mass. Three of the six enzymes were found to be functional. This showed an unprecedented redundancy for atromentin production in a basidiomycete.
