= Xerocomic acid =

Names
- Preferred IUPAC name (E)-[4-(3,4-Dihydroxyphenyl)-3-hydroxy-5-oxofuran-2(5H)-ylidene](4-hydroxyphenyl)acetic acid

Identifiers
CAS Number	25287-88-1
3D model (JSmol)	Interactive image
ChemSpider	30776773
PubChem CID	54730624
UNII	A8AF7UK664
CompTox Dashboard (EPA)	DTXSID601117270
- InChI: InChI=1S/C18H12O8/c19-10-4-1-8(2-5-10)14(17(23)24)16-15(22)13(18(25)26-16)9-3-6-11(20)12(21)7-9/h1-7,19-22H,(H,23,24)/b16-14+ Key: LJVSOLKVNIGBDE-JQIJEIRASA-N
- SMILES: OC(=O)C(=C1\OC(=O)C(=C1O)C1=CC=C(O)C(O)=C1)\C1=CC=C(O)C=C1

Properties
Chemical formula	C_{18}H_{12}O_{8}
Molar mass	356.286 g·mol^{−1}
Melting point	295 °C (563 °F; 568 K)
- Except where otherwise noted, data are given for materials in their standard state (at 25 °C [77 °F], 100 kPa). Infobox references

Xerocomic acid is a red-orange pigment found in fungi of the order Boletales (and is named after the genus Xerocomus). It is the precursor to variegatic acid, and is preceded by atromentic acid and atromentin. As an example, it is isolated from Serpula lacrymans. It is soluble in methanol. An oxidase acting on xerocomic acid is responsible for the "bluing" reaction seen in mushrooms.

Condensation of two units of xerocomic acid form the pigments sclerocitrin, badione A, and also norbadione A, which are found in the mushroom Scleroderma citrinum Pers.

Variants include isoxerocomic acid and O-methylxerocomic acid.
