= Grevilline =

Grevilline A
Grevilline B
Grevilline C
Grevilline D

Identifiers
CAS Number	A: 41744-32-5; B: 41744-33-6; C: 41744-34-7; D: 54707-49-2
3D model (JSmol)	A: Interactive image; B: Interactive image; C: Interactive image; D: Interactive image
ChEBI	A: CHEBI:174356
ChemSpider	A: 4522423; B: 4527860; C: 4521898; D: 4527497
PubChem CID	A: 5372047; B: 5379212; C: 5371346; D: 5378732
- InChI: A: InChI=1S/C18H12O6/c19-12-5-1-10(2-6-12)9-14-16(21)15(17(22)18(23)24-14)11-3-7-13(20)8-4-11/h1-9,19-21H/b14-9+ Key: HIUMAIHELPNSFG-NTEUORMPSA-N; B: InChI=1S/C18H12O7/c19-11-4-2-10(3-5-11)15-16(22)14(25-18(24)17(15)23)8-9-1-6-12(20)13(21)7-9/h1-8,19-22H/b14-8+ Key: OLZRNPOBVWGCKN-RIYZIHGNSA-N; C: InChI=1S/C18H12O8/c19-10-3-1-8(5-12(10)21)6-14-16(23)15(17(24)18(25)26-14)9-2-4-11(20)13(22)7-9/h1-7,19-23H/b14-6+ Key: SFYPADSXJOTYIW-MKMNVTDBSA-N; D: InChI=1S/C18H12O8/c19-9-2-4-11(20)10(7-9)15-16(23)14(26-18(25)17(15)24)6-8-1-3-12(21)13(22)5-8/h1-7,19-23H/b14-6+ Key: QKEFFIMFIWJNDJ-MKMNVTDBSA-N
- SMILES: A: C1=CC(=CC=C1/C=C/2\C(=C(C(=O)C(=O)O2)C3=CC=C(C=C3)O)O)O; B: C1=CC(=CC=C1C2=C(/C(=C\C3=CC(=C(C=C3)O)O)/OC(=O)C2=O)O)O; C: C1=CC(=C(C=C1/C=C/2\C(=C(C(=O)C(=O)O2)C3=CC(=C(C=C3)O)O)O)O)O; D: C1=CC(=C(C=C1/C=C/2\C(=C(C(=O)C(=O)O2)C3=C(C=CC(=C3)O)O)O)O)O

Properties
Chemical formula	A: C_{18}H_{12}O_{6} B: C_{18}H_{12}O_{7} C: C_{18}H_{12}O_{8} D: C_{18}H_{12}O_{8}
- Except where otherwise noted, data are given for materials in their standard state (at 25 °C [77 °F], 100 kPa). Infobox references

Grevillines (also spelled grevillins) are a group of natural chemical pigments found in certain fungi, notably the tamarack jack mushroom (Suillus grevillei). There are four members of the class, named grevilline A through D. Grevillines were first isolated from Suillus grevillei, from which they derive their name, and were characterized by Wolfgang Steglich in 1972.

Grevillines are polyphenolic compounds and contain a keto-pyranone group that is similar to hydroquinone. As pigments, they contribute to yellow, orange, and red coloration of the mushrooms they occur in.

Laboratory syntheses of grevillines have been reported.
