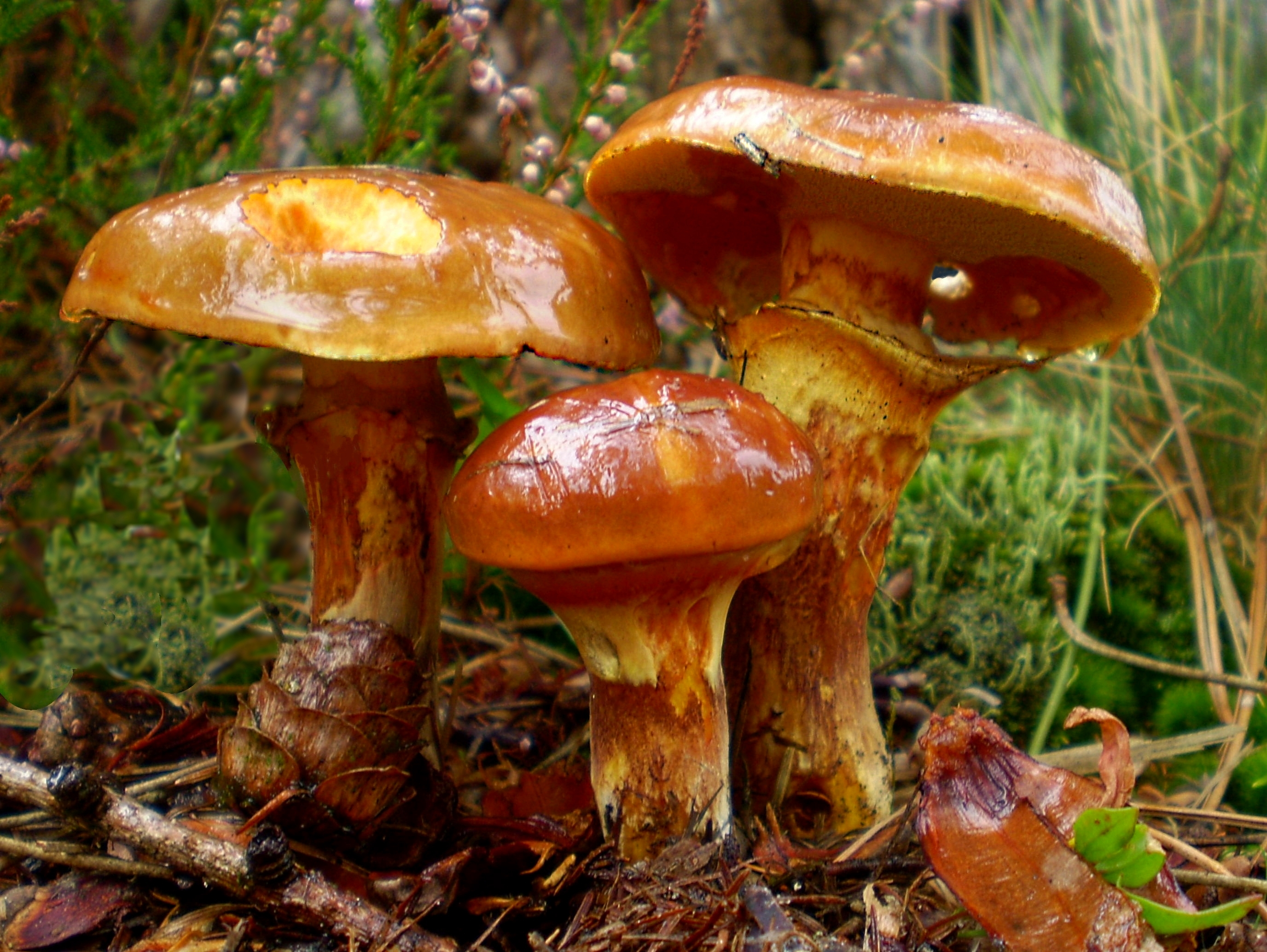

Conservation status
- Least Concern (IUCN 3.1)

- Secure (NatureServe)

Scientific classification
- Kingdom: Fungi
- Division: Basidiomycota
- Class: Agaricomycetes
- Order: Boletales
- Family: Suillaceae
- Genus: Suillus
- Species: S. grevillei

Binomial name
- Suillus grevillei (Klotzsch) Singer, 1945

Synonyms
- Boletinus grevillei (Klotzsch) Pomerl., 1980; Boletopsis elegans (Schumach.) Henn., 1898; Boletus annularius Bolton, 1792; Boletus clintonianus Peck, 1872; Boletus cortinatus Pers., 1801; Boletus elegans Schumach., 1803; Boletus elegans var. aureus Fr., 1838; Boletus elegans var. cyanescens Velen., 1939; Boletus grevillei Klotzsch, 1832; Cricunopus elegans (Schumach.) P. Karst., 1882; Ixocomus elegans (Schumach.) Singer, 1938; Ixocomus elegans f. badius Singer, 1938; Ixocomus elegans f. elegans (Schumach.) Singer, 1938; Ixocomus elegans f. griseoloporus Singer, 1938; Ixocomus flavus var. elegans (Schumach.) Quél., 1888; Ixocomus grevillei (Klotzsch) Vassilkov, 1955; Suillus clintonianus (Peck) Kuntze, 1898; Suillus elegans (Schumach.) Snell, 1944; Suillus grevillei f. badius (Singer) Singer, 1965; Suillus grevillei var. badius Singer; Suillus grevillei var. clintonianus (Peck) Singer, 1951; Suillus grevillei var. grevillei (Klotzsch) Singer, 1945; Suillus grevillei f. grevillei (Klotzsch) Singer, 1945; Suillus grevillei var. proximus (A.H. Sm. & Thiers) W. Klofac, 2013; Suillus proximus A.H. Sm. & Thiers, 1964; Viscipellis elegans (Schumach.) Quél., 1886; Viscipellis flava var. elegans (Schumach.) Quél., 1886

= Suillus grevillei =

Species of fungus

Suillus grevillei
- Mycological characteristics
- Pores on hymenium
- Cap is convex
- Hymenium is adnate
- Stipe has a ring
- Spore print is ochre
- Ecology is mycorrhizal
- Edibility is edible

Suillus grevillei, commonly known as tamarack jack, Greville's bolete, or larch bolete, is a mycorrhizal mushroom with a tight, brilliantly coloured cap, shiny and wet looking with its mucous slime layer. The hymenium easily separates from the flesh of the cap, with a central stalk that is quite slender. The species has a ring or a tight-fitting annular zone.

== Etymology ==
The specific epithet is derived from Robert Kaye Greville.

== Description ==
Suillus grevillei is a mushroom with a 5–10 cm (2–4 in) cap colored from citrus yellow to burnt orange, that is at first hemispherical, then bell-shaped, and finally flattened. It has a sticky skin, often with veil remnants on the edge, short tubes of yellow (possibly staining brownish) which descend down to the bottom of its cylindrical stalk (6–10 x 1–2 cm), which is yellowish above the ring area with streaks of reddish brown below. The flesh is yellow, staining brown.

Taste mild to slightly astringent to bitterish; odor none to somewhat metallic.

== Habitat and distribution ==
It grows only under larch trees. Widespread in North America and Europe (July–November). In Asia, it has been recorded from Taiwan.

== Edibility ==
Suillus grevillei can be cooked as an edible mushroom, though one without culinary interest, if the slimy cuticle is removed from the cap.

== Chemistry ==
The fungus produces grevillin which is characteristic of this fungus. Contain at least 11 yellow, orange, and red pigments derived from decarboxylated pulvinic acids, of which 3',4',4- trihydroxypulvinone is the major pigment. Cyclovariegatin is also partly responsible for its colour.

The genetic and enzymatic basis for atromentin, the precursor to various pulvinic acid-type pigments, has been characterized (an atromentin synthetase by the name, GreA). A cosmid library (31 249 bp in total) has been made from the genome. The estimated gene density based on the cosmid library is 1 per 3900 bp of genomic DNA. The genome has a GC content of 49.8%.

== See also ==
- List of North American boletes
- Larch bolete, other species of fungi associated with larch
