= Gymnopaxillus =

Scientific classification
- Kingdom: Fungi
- Division: Basidiomycota
- Class: Agaricomycetes
- Order: Boletales
- Family: Serpulaceae
- Genus: Gymnopaxillus; E.Horak (1966)

Type species
- Gymnopaxillus morchelliformis E.Horak (1966)

Species
- G. crubensis G. morchelliformis G. nudus G. vestitus

Genus of fungi

Gymnopaxillus is a genus of fungi in the family Serpulaceae. According to the Dictionary of the Fungi (10th edition, 2008), the family contains four species found in temperate South America and Australia. Gymnopaxillus was circumscribed by mycologist Egon Horak in 1966 with G. morchelliformis as the type species. G. crubensis, described from Argentina, was added in 1989, while the Australasian species G. nudus and G. vestitus were added to the genus in 2001.
