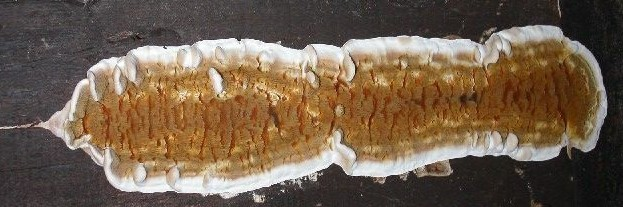
- Serpula lacrymans

Scientific classification
- Kingdom: Fungi
- Division: Basidiomycota
- Class: Agaricomycetes
- Order: Boletales
- Family: Serpulaceae; Jarosch & Bresinsky

Type genus
- Serpula (Pers.) Gray

Genera
- Austropaxillus; Gymnopaxillus; Serpula

= Serpulaceae =

Family of fungi

The Serpulaceae are a family of fungi in the Boletales order. According to the Dictionary of the Fungi (10th edition, 2008), the family contains 4 genera and 20 species. However, a molecular phylogenetics study showed that the genus Neopaxillus, which was formerly placed in this family, belongs in the family Crepidotaceae in the order Agaricales.
