= Variegatorubin =

Names
- IUPAC name (3E)-3-[4-(3,4-Dihydroxyphenyl)-3-hydroxy-5-oxo-2(5H)-furanylidene]-5,6-dihydroxy-1-benzofuran-2(3H)-one

Identifiers
CAS Number	27286-59-5
3D model (JSmol)	Interactive image
ChemSpider	52082514
PubChem CID	136247330
CompTox Dashboard (EPA)	DTXSID201045790
- InChI: InChI=1S/C18H10O9/c19-8-2-1-6(3-9(8)20)13-15(23)16(27-17(13)24)14-7-4-10(21)11(22)5-12(7)26-18(14)25/h1-5,19-23H/b16-14+ Key: UMIYSJROYJXHSW-JQIJEIRASA-N; InChI=1/C18H10O9/c19-8-2-1-6(3-9(8)20)13-15(23)16(27-17(13)24)14-7-4-10(21)11(22)5-12(7)26-18(14)25/h1-5,19-23H/b16-14+ Key: UMIYSJROYJXHSW-JQIJEIRABG
- SMILES: c1cc(c(cc1C2=C(/C(=C\3/c4cc(c(cc4OC3=O)O)O)/OC2=O)O)O)O

Properties
Chemical formula	C_{18}H_{10}O_{9}
Molar mass	370.267
- Except where otherwise noted, data are given for materials in their standard state (at 25 °C [77 °F], 100 kPa). Infobox references

Variegatorubin is a pulvinic acid derivative. It is a red pigment that is present in many members of the Boletales, an order of the division Basidiomycota. It is generated from the oxidation of variegatic acid. Bolete species that contain variegatorubin include Neoboletus luridiformis, Chalciporus piperatus, Rhizopogon roseolus, Exsudoporus frostii, Suillellus luridus, Rubroboletus rhodoxanthus, and R. satanas. Variegatorubin was discovered by Wolfgang Steglich and colleagues, and described as a new compound in 1970.
