= Atromentic acid =

Identifiers
CAS Number	521-56-2
3D model (JSmol)	Interactive image; (E): Interactive image
ChemSpider	(E): 10293801
PubChem CID	76183432; (E): 54716518
- InChI: InChI=1S/C18H12O7/c19-11-5-1-9(2-6-11)13-15(21)16(25-18(13)24)14(17(22)23)10-3-7-12(20)8-4-10/h1-8,19-21H,(H,22,23) Key: QFIPVAAXLHOLFN-PEZBUJJGSA-N; (E): InChI=1S/C18H12O7/c19-11-5-1-9(2-6-11)13-15(21)16(25-18(13)24)14(17(22)23)10-3-7-12(20)8-4-10/h1-8,19-21H,(H,22,23)/b16-14+ Key: QFIPVAAXLHOLFN-JQIJEIRASA-N; (Z): InChI=1S/C18H12O7/c19-11-5-1-9(2-6-11)13-15(21)16(25-18(13)24)14(17(22)23)10-3-7-12(20)8-4-10/h1-8,19-21H,(H,22,23)/b16-14-
- SMILES: c1cc(O)ccc1C(=C(O)2)C(=O)OC2=C(C(O)=O)c3ccc(O)cc3; (E): C1=CC(=CC=C1C2=C(/C(=C(/C3=CC=C(C=C3)O)\C(=O)O)/OC2=O)O)O

Properties
Chemical formula	C_{18}H_{12}O_{7}
Molar mass	340.2837
- Except where otherwise noted, data are given for materials in their standard state (at 25 °C [77 °F], 100 kPa). Infobox references

Atromentic acid is a red-orange pigment found in fungi within the Boletales group. It is the precursor to variegatic acid and xerocomic acid, and is preceded by atromentin. As an example, it is isolated from Serpula lacrymans. It is soluble in methanol. Variants include homoatromentic acid. This pigment has been studied and elucidated by Wolfgang Steglich and colleagues over decades. When atromentin is oxidised with hydrogen peroxide a yellow product is produced. A sodium hydroxide solution is also yellow, but when this is neutralized with acid the red atromentic acid crystallises. Concentrated potassium hydroxide breaks up the compound to p-hydroxyphenylacetic acid and oxalic acid.
