= Vulpinic acid =

Chemical compound

Chemical structure of vulpinic acid
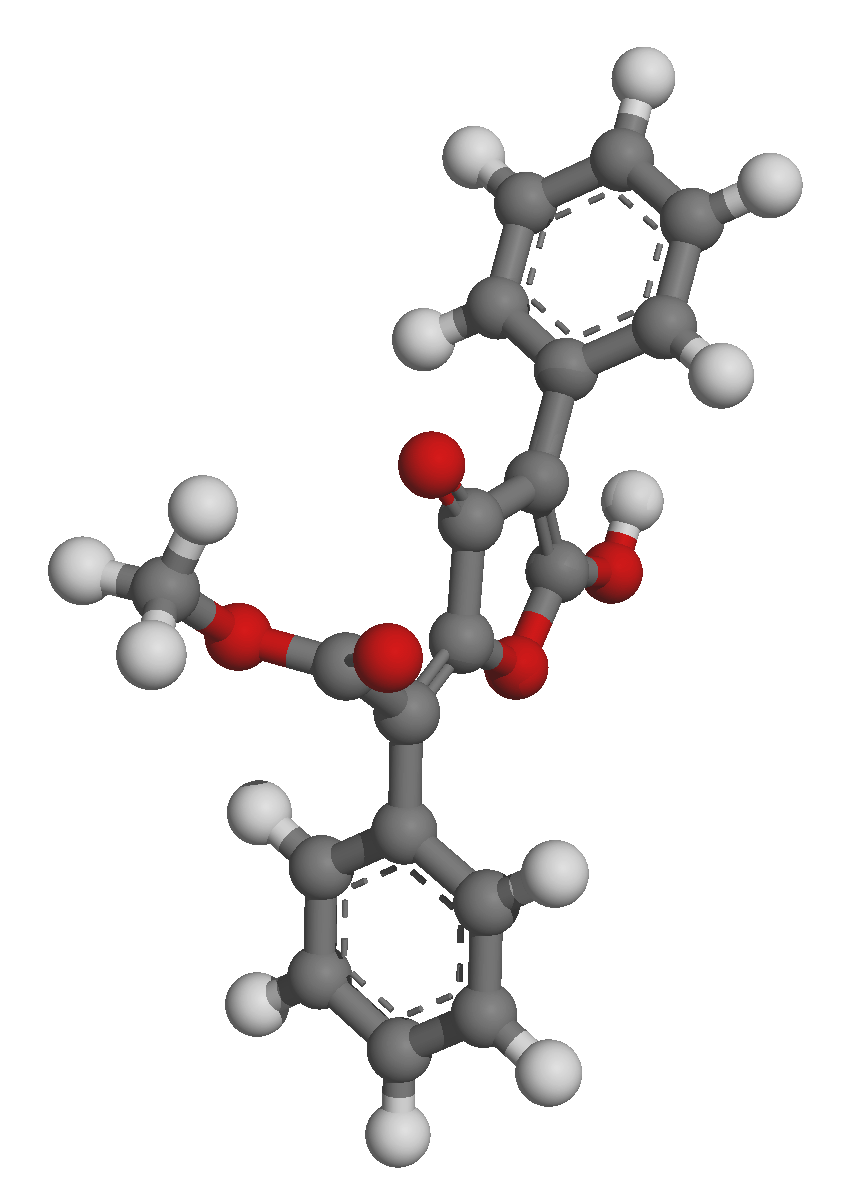

Names
- Preferred IUPAC name Methyl (E)-(5-hydroxy-3-oxo-4-phenylfuran-2(3H)-ylidene)phenylacetate

Identifiers
CAS Number	521-52-8
3D model (JSmol)	Interactive image
ChEBI	CHEBI:144250
ChEMBL	ChEMBL463212
ChemSpider	10348869
ECHA InfoCard	100.007.560
EC Number	208-314-1
PubChem CID	54690323
UNII	13N7RF6M84
- InChI: InChI=1S/C19H14O5/c1-23-18(21)15(13-10-6-3-7-11-13)17-16(20)14(19(22)24-17)12-8-4-2-5-9-12/h2-11,20H,1H3/b17-15+ Key: OMZRMXULWNMRAE-BMRADRMJSA-N
- SMILES: COC(=O)/C(=C/1\C(=O)C(=C(O1)O)C2=CC=CC=C2)/C3=CC=CC=C3

Properties
Chemical formula	C_{19}H_{14}O_{5}
Molar mass	322.316 g·mol^{−1}

Hazards
- GHS labelling
Pictograms	(GHS07: Exclamation mark)
Signal word	Warning
Hazard statements	H302
Precautionary statements	P264, P270, P301+P317, P330, P501
- Except where otherwise noted, data are given for materials in their standard state (at 25 °C [77 °F], 100 kPa). verify (what is ?) Infobox references

Vulpinic acid is a natural product first found in and important in the symbiosis underlying the biology of lichens. It is a simple methyl ester derivative of its parent compound, pulvinic acid, and a close relative of pulvinone, both of which derive from aromatic amino acids such as phenylalanine via secondary metabolism. The roles of vulpinic acid are not fully established, but may include properties that make it an antifeedant for herbivores. The compound is relatively toxic to mammals.

== Chemical description ==
Vulpinic acid was first isolated from lichens in 1925. As an isolated, purified substance, it is bright yellow in color.

Vulpinic acid is derived biosynthetically by esterification from pulvinic acid; pulvinate itself derives from the aromatic amino acids phenylalanine and tyrosine, via dimerization and oxidative ring-cleavage of arylpyruvic acids, a process that also produces the related pulvinones.

There have been several chemical syntheses reported for vulpinic acid. In one, butenolides were efficiently functionalized by Suzuki cross-coupling reactions via the corresponding enol triflates.

== Occurrence in lichens ==
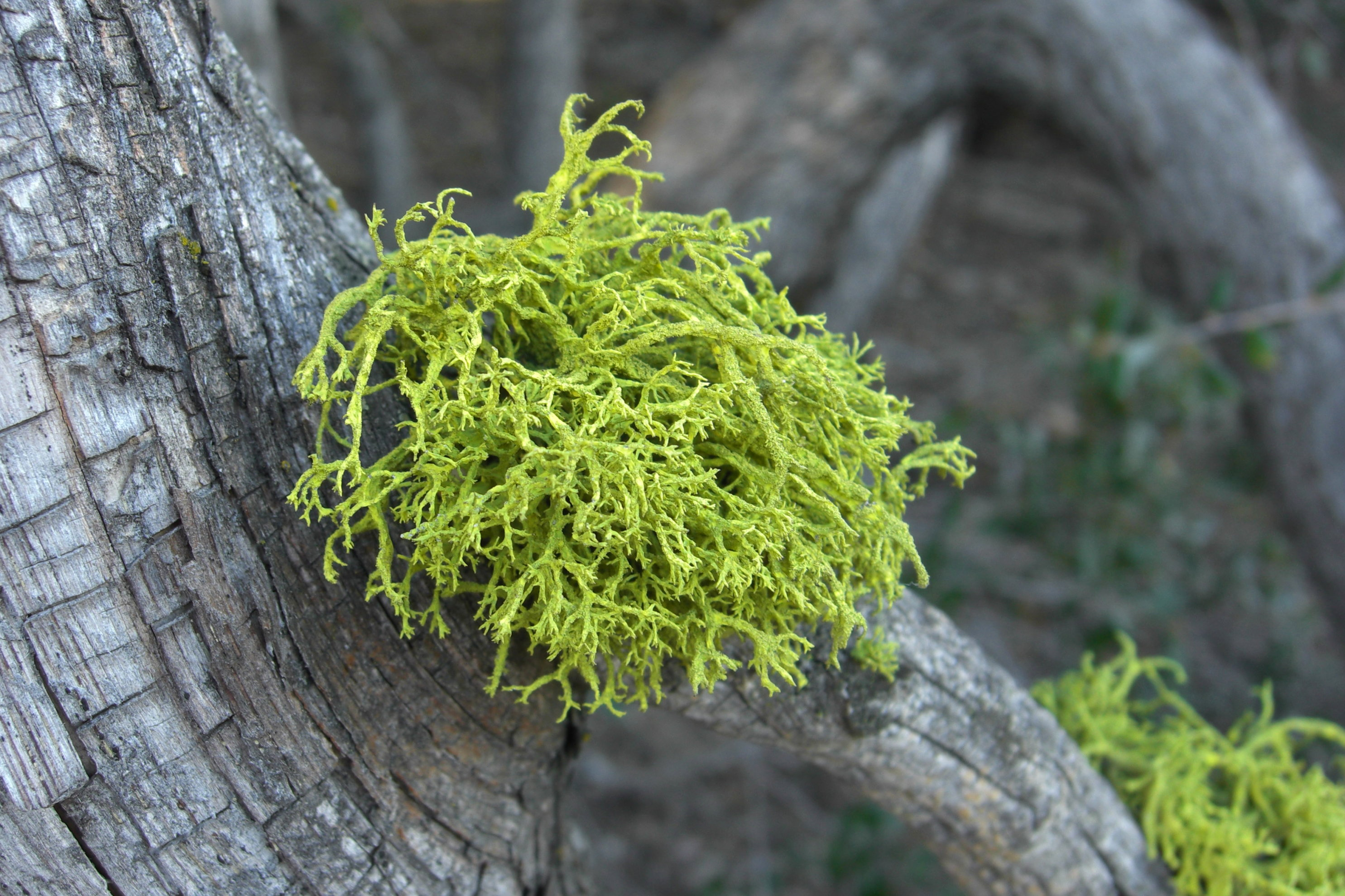
The lichen Letharia vulpina, whose bright color is due in part to vulpinic acid.

Pulvinic acid is found in several lichen species, as well as some non-lichenized fungi. It is a secondary metabolite of the fungal partner in the lichen symbiosis. It was found in the bolete fungus Pulveroboletus ravenelii. In 2016, a new group of basidiomycetes distinct from the well known lichen fungal partner was implicated in producing vulpinic acid.

== Bioactivities ==
Vulpinic acid is relatively toxic to meat-eating mammals as well as insects and molluscs. However, it is not toxic to rabbits and mice. One biological function of vulpinic acid may be as a repellent that lichens have evolved to deter grazing by herbivores. Lichens may also exploit the ultraviolet-blocking properties of the molecule, protecting the underlying photobionts. For example, vulpinic acid is thought to function as a blue light screen in Letharia vulpina. It had been shown previously to protect human skin cells in tissue culture against ultraviolet B-induced damage.

Humans have exploited its mammalian toxicity, using lichens containing high amounts of the chemical (e.g., Letharia vulpina) to poison wolves in Scandinavia, sometimes adding it to baits containing reindeer blood and glass.

Vulpinic acid has some antibacterial activity against gram-positive bacteria, and has been shown to disrupt cell division in MRSA.

== See also ==
- Lichenology
