= Xerocomorubin =

Names
- IUPAC name 5,6-Dihydroxy-3-[3-hydroxy-4-(4-hydroxyphenyl)-5-oxo-2(5H)-furanylidene]-2(3H)-benzofuranone

Identifiers
| CAS Number | 50422-97-4 |
| 3D model (JSmol) | Interactive image |
| ChemSpider | 129557842 |
| PubChem CID | 162882814 |
| CompTox Dashboard (EPA) | DTXSID001337189 |
- InChI: InChI=1S/C18H10O8/c19-8-3-1-7(2-4-8)13-15(22)16(26-17(13)23)14-9-5-10(20)11(21)6-12(9)25-18(14)24/h1-6,19-22H/b16-14+ Key: KSBHFBKGAVZFRD-JQIJEIRASA-N
- SMILES: c1cc(O)ccc1C(=C(O)2)C(=O)OC2=C3C(=O)OC4=C3C=C(O)C(O)=C4

Properties
| Chemical formula | C_{18}H_{10}O_{8} |
| Molar mass | 354.270 g·mol^{−1} |
- Except where otherwise noted, data are given for materials in their standard state (at 25 °C [77 °F], 100 kPa). Infobox references

Xerocomorubin is a pigment from the fungus order Boletales. It is the oxidized form of isoxerocomic acid. Air oxidation is responsible its formation, and it oxidizes faster to a similar pulvinic acid type pigment oxidized variant, variegatorubin. The long wavelength has an absorption at 497 nm, 106 nm higher than its precursor isoxerocomic acid. Synthesis experiments have shown tetra-acetylation by acetic anhydride and sulfuric acid. Although xerocomorubin and variegatorubin give off the same deep red color and could simultaneously occur in a mushroom, extracts from the deep red colored mushroom Boletus rubellus Krombh. identified only variegatorubin by thin layer chromatography (TLC), leading to the question the natural abundance of xerocomorubin.
