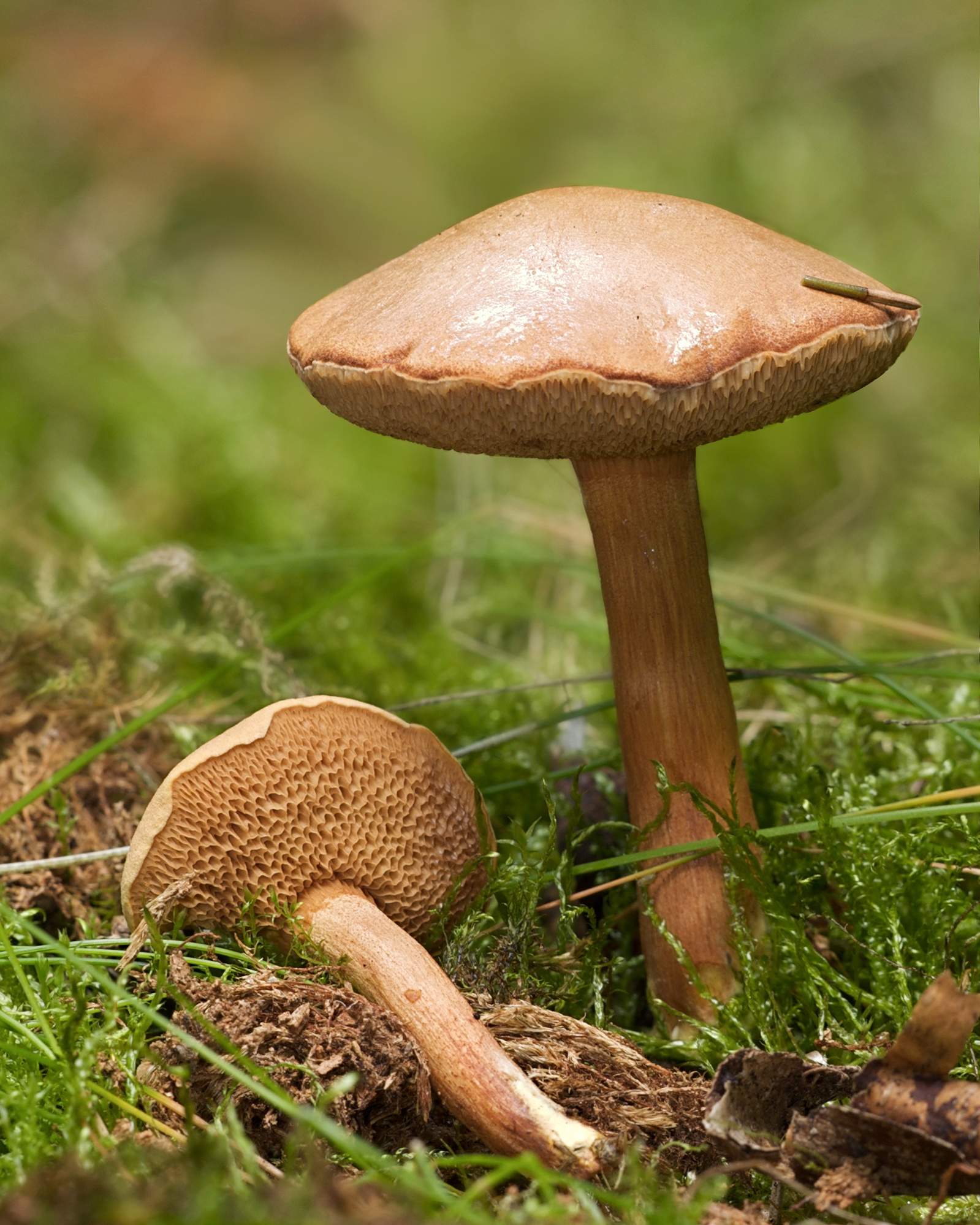
- Chalciporus piperatus

Scientific classification
- Kingdom: Fungi
- Division: Basidiomycota
- Class: Agaricomycetes
- Order: Boletales
- Family: Boletaceae
- Genus: Chalciporus; Bataille (1908)

Type species
- Chalciporus piperatus (Bull.) Bataille (1908)

Species
- 28 species

= Chalciporus =

Genus of fungi

Chalciporus is a genus of fungi in the family Boletaceae (suborder Boletineae). There are approximately 25 species in the genus.

French mycologist Frédéric Bataille erected the genus in 1908, though it did not gain general acceptance for several decades and was often classified as a section (Piperati) of the genus Suillus or related to the genus Pulveroboletus. The type species is Chalciporus piperatus. Rolf Singer resurrected the genus in 1973, separating the species from the genus Suillus on the basis of distinct pigments. The name is derived from the Ancient Greek khalkos "copper", and translates as "copper pores".

The genus Chalciporus, together with the genus Buchwaldoboletus form a group of fungi that is an early offshoot in the Boletaceae. Many members of the group appear to be parasitic. Wu and Yang proposed that this clade be called the subfamily Chalciporoideae. The genus Rubinoboletus was merged into this genus based on their morphological similarity, and subsequent genetic analysis—mainly due to Rubinoboletus (now Chalciporus) rubinus being nested within Chalciporus.

Members of the genus Chalciporus have boletoid fruit bodies with pores that are various shades of red to pink, stipes lacking in reticulations, yellow mycelium and smooth oval spores.

Two species, C. chontae and C. radiatus, have pores that are arranged in furrows that radiate out from the top of the stipe under the cap and resemble gills.

C. piperatus and C. piperatoides are peppery-tasting, the former is edible while the latter is unknown. C. rubinellus and C. pseudorubinellus are milder-tasting and edible.

== Species ==
- Chalciporus africanus
- Chalciporus amarellus
- Chalciporus aurantiacus
- Chalciporus cervinococcineus
- Chalciporus chontae — Costa Rica
- Chalciporus griseus
- Chalciporus luteopurpureus
- Chalciporus phaseolisporus
- Chalciporus phlebopoides
- Chalciporus pierrhuguesii
- Chalciporus piperatoides
- Chalciporus piperatus
- Chalciporus piperolamellatus
- Chalciporus pseudorubinellus — Colombia
- Chalciporus radiatus — southern China
- Chalciporus rubinellus
- Chalciporus rubinus
- Chalciporus subflammeus
- Chalciporus virescens
