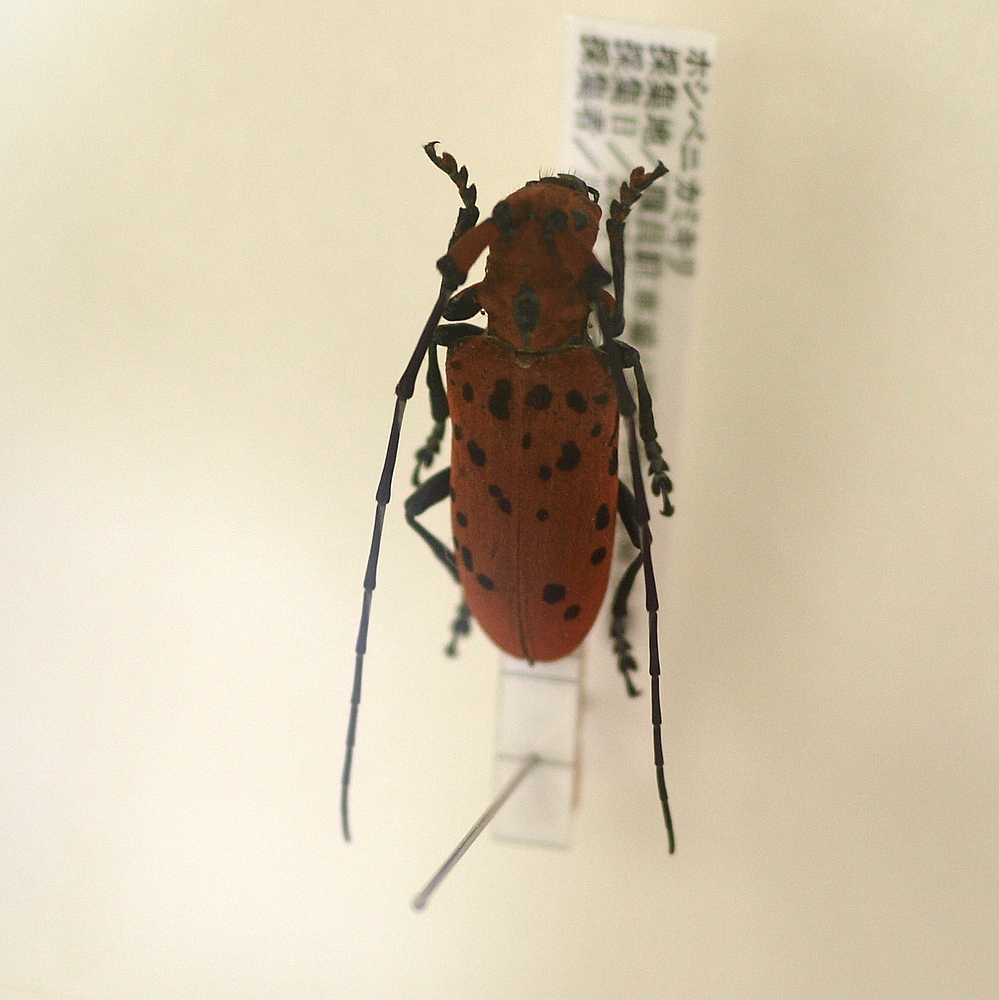

Scientific classification
- Kingdom: Animalia
- Phylum: Arthropoda
- Class: Insecta
- Order: Coleoptera
- Suborder: Polyphaga
- Infraorder: Cucujiformia
- Family: Cerambycidae
- Genus: Eupromus
- Species: E. ruber

Binomial name
- Eupromus ruber (Dalman, 1817)

Synonyms
- Cyriocrates ruber (Dalman, 1817); Lamia rubra Dalman, 1817; Melanauster ruber (Dalman, 1817); Monohammus championi White, 1858; Oplophora (Callimation) sieboldi Guérin-Ménéville, 1844

= Eupromus ruber =

Species of beetle

Eupromus ruber, the red spotted longhorn beetle, is a species of beetle in the family Cerambycidae. It was described by Dalman in 1817. It is known from Japan, China, and Taiwan. It feeds on Cinnamomum camphora and Cunninghamia lanceolata.
