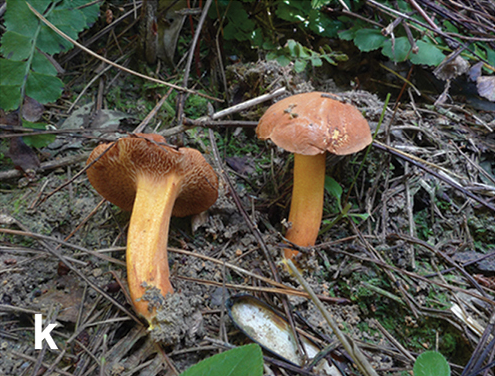

Scientific classification
- Domain: Eukaryota
- Kingdom: Fungi
- Division: Basidiomycota
- Class: Agaricomycetes
- Order: Boletales
- Family: Boletaceae
- Genus: Chalciporus
- Species: C. radiatus

Binomial name
- Chalciporus radiatus Ming Zhang & T.H.Li (2015)

= Chalciporus radiatus =

Species of fungus

Chalciporus radiatus is a bolete fungus of the family Boletaceae. Found in southern China, it was described as new to science in 2015 by Ming Zhang and Tai-Hui Li. The specific epithet radiatus refers to the distinct radial arrangement of the hymenophore.

== Description ==
Fruit bodies have grayish-yellow to brownish-orange caps measuring 1–3 cm (0.4–1.2 in) in diameter. The pore surface on the cap underside is initially orange to red, later becoming brownish in age. Pores are small, measuring 1–2 mm in diameter. Spores are fusiform (tapered at both ends) to cylindrical with smooth walls, measuring 7–8 by 3.5–4 μm.

== Habitat and distribution ==
Fruit bodies are found singly or scattered under Cunninghamia lanceolata, and species of Cyclobalanopsis and Castanopsis. The type collection was made in Jiulongjiang National Forest Park in Chenzhou, Hunan Province; it has also been collected in Guangdong.
