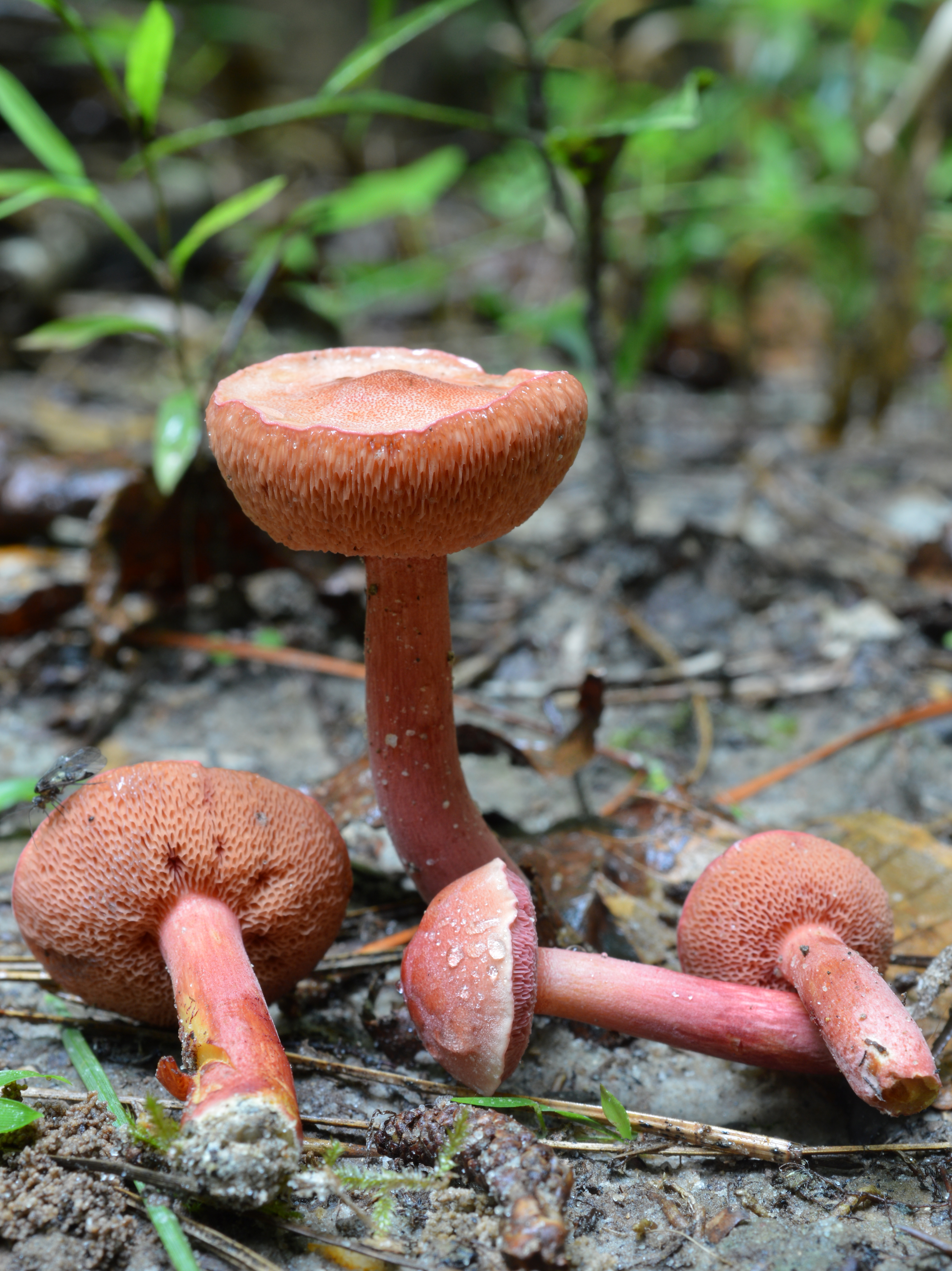

Scientific classification
- Domain: Eukaryota
- Kingdom: Fungi
- Division: Basidiomycota
- Class: Agaricomycetes
- Order: Boletales
- Family: Boletaceae
- Genus: Chalciporus
- Species: C. rubinellus

Binomial name
- Chalciporus rubinellus (Peck) Singer

Synonyms
- Boletus pseudorubinellus Peck (1879); Suillus rubinellus (Peck) Singer (1945); Tubiporus rubinellus (Peck) S. Imai (1968)

= Chalciporus rubinellus =

Species of fungus

Chalciporus rubinellus Mycological characteristics
- Pores on hymenium
- Cap is convex or conical
- Hymenium is adnate
- Stipe is bare
- Spore print is brown
- Ecology is mycorrhizal
- Edibility is not recommended

Chalciporus rubinellus, commonly known as the purple-red bolete, is a bolete fungus of the family Boletaceae. It was first described in 1879 as Boletus rubinellus, and later transferred to the genus Chalciporus in 1973.

== Description ==
Its cap is 1.5-5 cm wide and varies in texture from smooth to tufted-hairy, to slimy when wet. It is conical and purple-red when young, becoming yellow-tinted or reddish brown and convex and cracked with age. Its flesh is bright yellow and does not bruise. KOH stains the cap amber to reddish-brown, while ammonia causes the cap to turn blood red and then change to dark orange. It has white basal mycelium.

Its pores are 1.5 mm wide, and initially bright red, becoming lighter with age, while its tubes are 6-10 mm deep and become yellowish with age. The dimensions of the stipe are 1-6 cm long, and 3-10 mm thick, and it has thread-like texture its colour is similar to the cap.

Its spores are smooth and spindle-shaped, measuring 12-15 μm, and its spore print is brown. It has scattered pleurocystidia that are 34-62 x 7-12 μm.

== Ecology ==
Chalciporus rubinellus can grow solitary or in clusters around the trees it has mycorrhizal relationships with, usually conifers like spruce, hemlock and white pine. It grows from July to September.

== Uses ==
Eating Chalciporus rubinellus is not recommended, and its odour and taste are not distinctive. It can be used to dye protein-based fabric brown.

== Similar species ==
Genetically it is closely related to Chalciporus amarellus.Chalciporus rubinellus can be distinguished from Chalciporus piperatus and Chalciporous piperatoides by its mycelium, being white without a yellow tint and mild rather than peppery flavour.

== See also ==
- List of North American boletes
