= Chalciporus amarellus =

Scientific classification
- Domain: Eukaryota
- Kingdom: Fungi
- Division: Basidiomycota
- Class: Agaricomycetes
- Order: Boletales
- Family: Boletaceae
- Genus: Chalciporus
- Species: C. amarellus

Binomial name
- Chalciporus amarellus (Quél.) Bataille (1908)

Synonyms
- Boletus amarellus Quél. (1883); Versipellis amarella (Quél.) Quél. (1886); Suillus piperatus var. amarellus (Quél.) Singer (1945); Chalciporus piperatus var. amarellus (Quél.) Pilát & Dermek (1974)

Species of fungus

Chalciporus amarellus is a bolete fungus of the family Boletaceae, native to Europe. It was first described in 1883 by French mycologist Lucien Quélet as Boletus amarellus, and later transferred in genus Chalciporus by Frédéric Bataille in 1908.

Genetically, this species is closely related to Chalciporus rubinellus.
