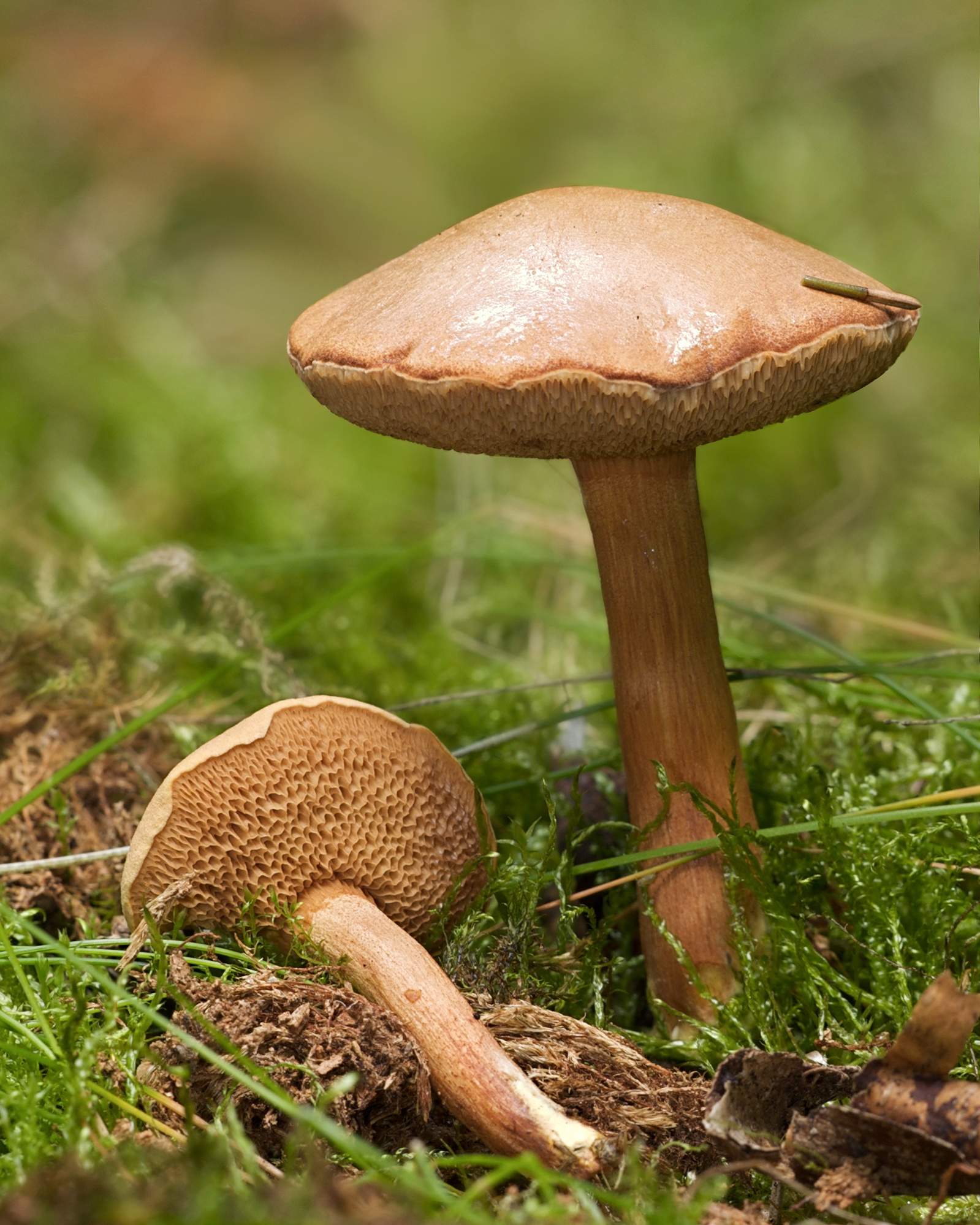

Scientific classification
- Kingdom: Fungi
- Division: Basidiomycota
- Class: Agaricomycetes
- Order: Boletales
- Family: Boletaceae
- Genus: Chalciporus
- Species: C. piperatus

Binomial name
- Chalciporus piperatus (Bull.) Bataille (1908)

Synonyms
- Boletus piperatus Bull. (1790); Leccinum piperatum (Bull.) Gray (1821); Viscipellis piperata (Bull.) Quél. (1886); Ixocomus piperatus (Bull.) Quél. (1888); Suillus piperatus (Bull.) O.Kuntze (1898); Ceriomyces piperatus (Bull.) Murrill (1909)

= Chalciporus piperatus =

Species of mushroom found in Europe and North America

Chalciporus piperatus
- Mycological characteristics
- Pores on hymenium
- Cap is convex
- Hymenium is adnate
- Stipe is bare
- Spore print is brown
- Ecology is parasitic
- Edibility is edible or inedible

Chalciporus piperatus, commonly known as the peppery bolete, is a species of fungus in the family Boletaceae. Described by Pierre Bulliard in 1790 as Boletus piperatus, it is only distantly related to other members of the genus Boletus and was reclassified as Chalciporus piperatus by Frédéric Bataille in 1908. The genus Chalciporus was an early branching lineage in the Boletaceae and appears to be related to boletes with parasitic properties.

A small bolete, the fruit body has a 1.6–9 cm (5/8–3 1/2 in) orange-fawn cap with small cinnamon to brown pores underneath. The stipe is 4–9.5 cm (1 5/8–3 3/4 in) long and 0.6–1.2 cm (1/4–1/2 in). The flesh has a very peppery taste. The rare variety hypochryseus, found only in Europe, has yellow pores and tubes. The species is found in mixed woodland in Europe and North America. It has been recorded under introduced trees in Brazil, and has become naturalised in Tasmania and spread under native Nothofagus cunninghamii trees. Previously thought to be ectomycorrhizal (a symbiotic relationship that occurs between a fungus and the roots of various plant species), C. piperatus is now suspected of being parasitic on Amanita muscaria.

== Taxonomy ==
French mycologist Pierre Bulliard described the species as Boletus piperatus in 1790. In its taxonomic history, it has been transferred to the genera Leccinum (Samuel Frederick Gray, 1821), Viscipellis (Lucien Quélet, 1886), Ixocomus (Quélet, 1888), Suillus (Otto Kuntze, 1898), and Ceriomyces (William Alphonso Murrill, 1909). It was reclassified and given its current binomial name in 1908 by Frédéric Bataille when he made it the type species of the newly circumscribed genus Chalciporus. The species name piperatus means "peppery" in Latin. It is commonly known as the "peppery bolete".

Chalciporus piperatus is a member of the genus Chalciporus, with which the genus Buchwaldoboletus form a group of fungi that is an early offshoot in the Boletaceae. Many members of the group appear to be parasitic.

Two varieties have been described. Chalciporus piperatus var. hypochryseus was originally described as Boletus hypochryseus by Czech mycologist Josef Šutara in 1993, and was moved to Chalciporus a year later by Regis Courtecuisse. Wolfgang Klofac and Irmgard Krisai-Greilhuber reclassified it as a variety of C. piperatus in 2006, although some sources continue to regard it as a distinct species. Variety amarellus, first published by Quélet as Boletus amarellus in 1883 and later transferred to Chalciporus by Bataille in 1908, was described as a variety of C. piperatus in 1974 by Albert Pilát and Aurel Dermek. Authorities disagree as to whether or not it has independent taxonomic significance.

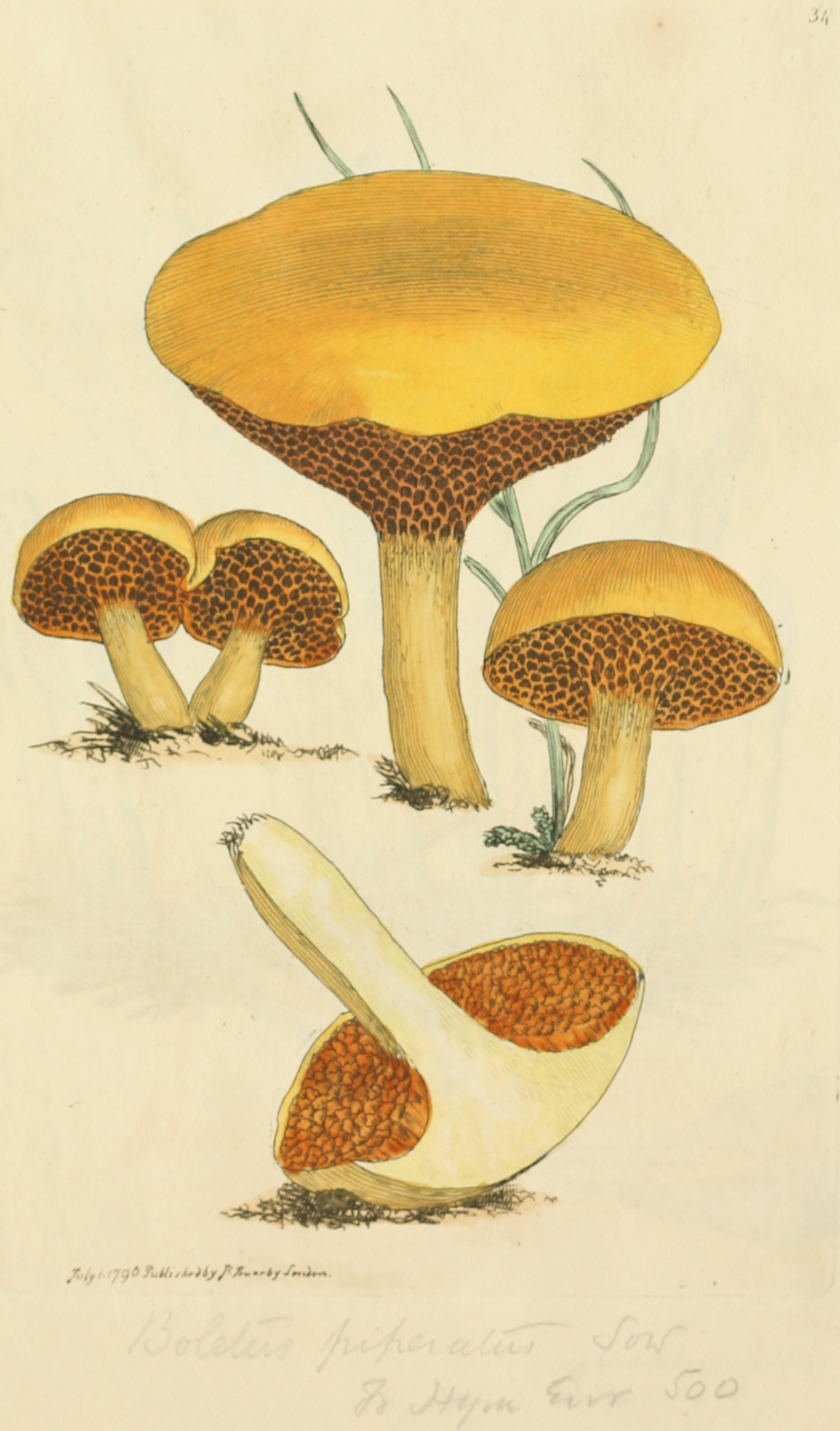
James Sowerby's 1797 illustration

== Description ==
One of the smaller boletes, Chalciporus piperatus has an orange-fawn 1.6–9 cm (5/8–3 1/2 in) cap that is initially convex before flattening out in age. The cap surface can be furrowed; shiny when dry, it can be a little sticky when wet, and may crack with age. The colour of the pore surface ranges from yellowish to dark reddish brown in maturity. When bruised, the pore surface stains brown. Individual pores are angular, measuring about 0.5–2 mm wide, while the tubes are 3–10 mm deep. Slender for a bolete, the stipe measures 4–9.5 cm (1 5/8–3 3/4 in) long by 0.6–1.2 cm (1/4–1/2 in) thick, and is either roughly the same width throughout its length, or slightly thicker near the base. The colour of the stem is similar to the cap, or lighter, and there is yellow mycelium at the base. The flesh is yellow, sometimes with reddish tones, maturing to purplish brown. It has no odour. The spore print is brown to cinnamon. Variety hypochryseus is essentially identical to the main form except for its bright yellow tubes and pores. Variety amarellus has pinker pores and a taste that is bitter rather than peppery.

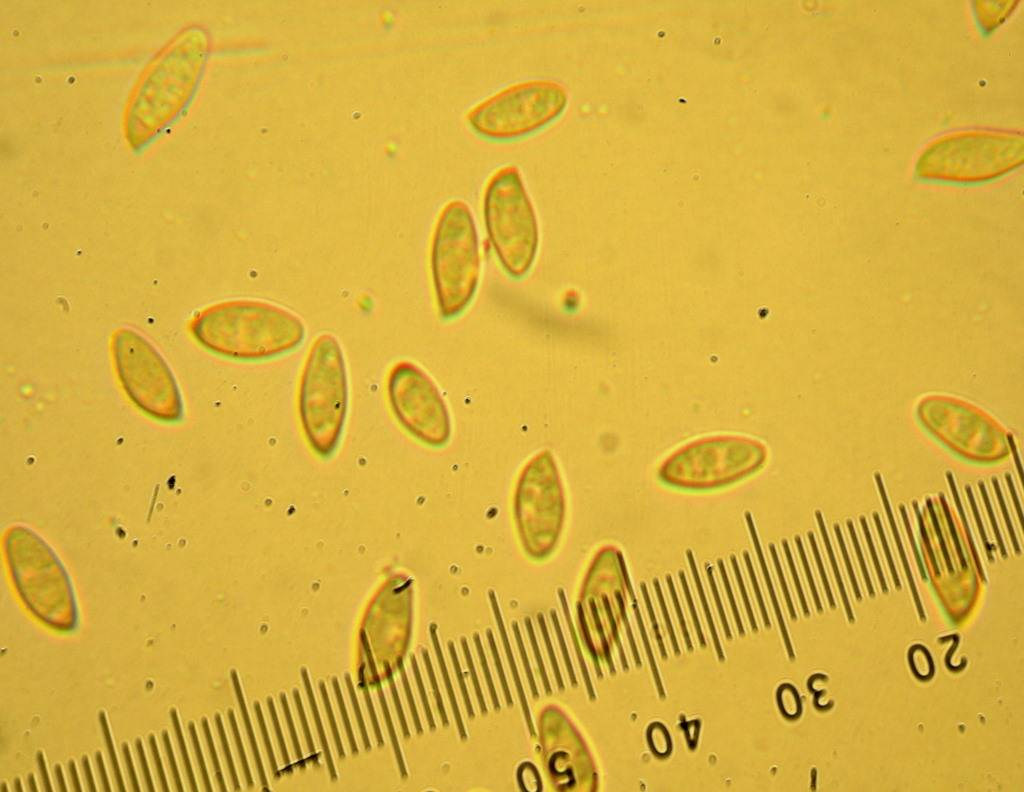
The spores are narrowly fusiform.

The spores are smooth, narrowly fusiform (fuse-shaped), and measure 7–12 by 3–5 μm. The basidia (spore-bearing cells) measure 20–28 by 6–8 μm and are hyaline (translucent), four-spored, and narrowly club-shaped, with many internal oil droplets. The cystidia are fusiform, sometimes with a rounded tip, and have dimensions of 30–50 by 9–12 μm. Some are more or less hyaline, while others are encrusted with a golden pigment. The cap cuticle is a trichodermium, an arrangement in which the outermost hyphae emerge roughly parallel, like hairs, perpendicular to the cap surface. These hyphae are 10–17 μm wide and have elliptical to cylindrical cells at their ends that are not gelatinous. Clamp connections are absent from the hyphae.

=== Similar species ===
The fruit body of the North American species Chalciporus piperatoides are similar, but can be distinguished by its flesh and pores staining blue after cutting or bruising. It has a less peppery taste. Another mild-tasting relative, C. rubinellus, has brighter colours than C. piperatus, including completely red tubes. One European species, C. rubinus, has a shape similar to C. piperatus, but has red pores and a stem covered in red dots.

== Distribution and habitat ==
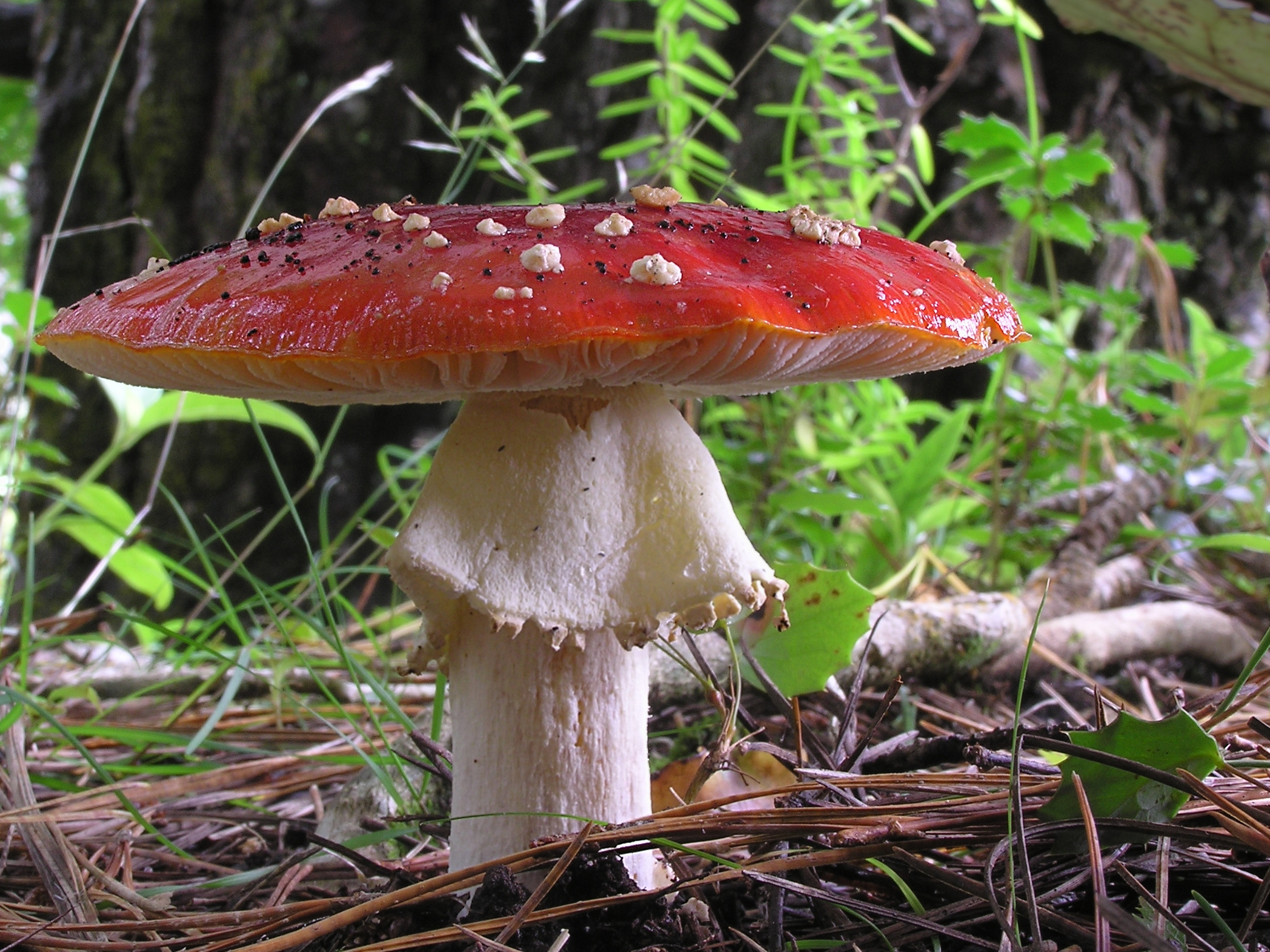
Chalciporus piperatus is suspected to be parasitic on Amanita muscaria (pictured).

Fruit bodies of Chalciporus piperatus occur singly, scattered, or in groups on the ground. The fungus occurs naturally in or near coniferous or beech and oak woodlands, often on sandy soils. Fruit bodies appear in Europe in late summer and autumn from August to November. The fungus is widespread across North America, fruiting from July to October in the eastern states and from September to January on the Pacific Coast. It is found in Mexico and Central America. In Asia, it has been collected from Pakistan, West Bengal (India), and Guangdong Province (China). In South Africa, it is known from the southwestern Cape Province and the eastern Transvaal Province.

Chalciporus piperatus grows in conifer plantations associated with the fly agaric (Amanita muscaria) and the chanterelle (Cantharellus cibarius). It has been recorded under introduced loblolly pine (Pinus taeda) plantations in Santa Catarina and Paraná states in southern Brazil, and under introduced trees in the Los Lagos Region of Chile. It has also spread into native forest in northeastern Tasmania and Victoria, having been found growing with the native myrtle beech (Nothofagus cunninghamii). The rare variety hypochryseus occurs only in Europe, including Austria, Czechia, Greece, Italy, and Spain. Also rare, variety amarellus is widespread in European coniferous forests, where it usually found near pines, spruce, and sometimes fir.

Fruit bodies can be parasitised by the mould Sepedonium chalcipori, a highly specialised mycoparasite that is only known to infect this bolete. Infections result in necrotic mushroom tissue and the production of copious yellow conidia.

Initially thought to be ectomycorrhizal (symbiotic with plants, like most Boletaceae), C. piperatus has not been confirmed as such in multiple synthesis studies or in isotope fractionation studies. There is some speculation that C. piperatus is a mycoparasite on the mycorrhiza of A. muscaria. In New Zealand, A. muscaria is thought to have been introduced with Pinus radiata, and has made a host jump to the native Nothofagus trees; C. piperatus has since been observed fruiting near Nothofagus trees with A. muscaria associations. Buchwaldoboletus lignicola is in the same clade as C. piperatus and is thought to be a parasite as well, strengthening the evidence that C. piperatus and its relatives may be mycoparasites.

== Uses ==
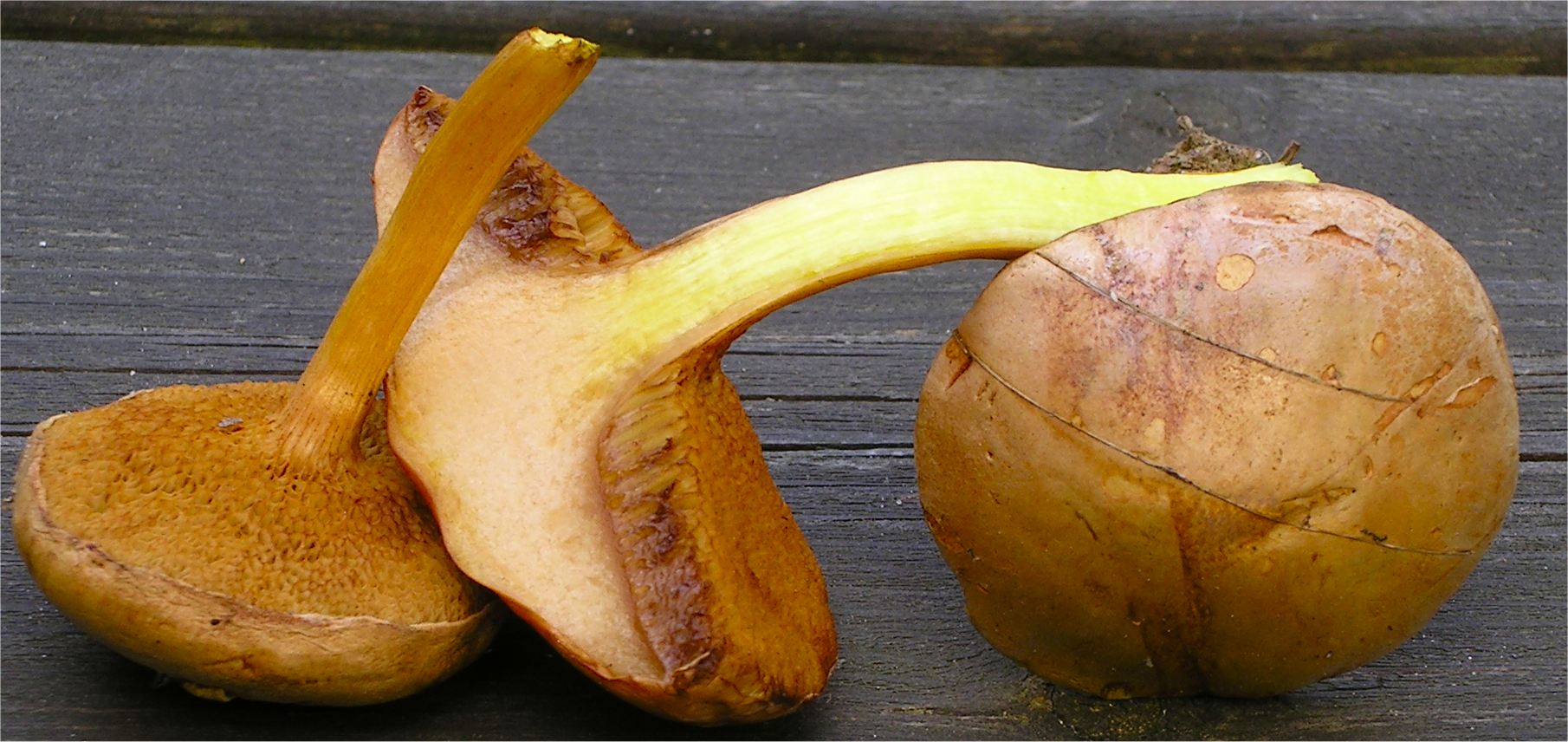
In cross-section

This mushroom contains toxins and is usually considered inedible. It has been used as a condiment in many countries, with the Italian chef Antonio Carluccio recommending it be used only to add its peppery flavour to other mushrooms. Some recommend that it be well-cooked before consumption to minimize the risk of gastric symptoms, but the peppery taste is lost with cooking, and even more so by reducing it to a powdered form.

Fruit bodies can be used for mushroom dyeing; depending on the mordant used, yellow, orange, or greenish-brown dyes can be made.

== Chemistry ==
Sclerocitrin, a pigment compound originally isolated from the common earthball (Scleroderma citrinum), is the major contributor to the yellow colour of the mycelium and the stipe base of C. piperatus fruit bodies. Other compounds that have been isolated from this species include norbadione A, chalciporone, xerocomic acid, variegatic acid, variegatorubin, and another yellow pigment, chalcitrin. Chalciporone is responsible for the bitter taste of the fruit bodies. The pigments sclerocitrin, chalcitrin, and norbadione A are derived biosynthetically from xerocomic acid. Related compounds found in the fruit bodies include the chalciporone isomers isochalciporone and dehydroisochalciporone.

A field study of fungi growing in polluted sites in Czechia and Slovakia found that C. piperatus fruit bodies growing near lead smelters and on mine and slag dumps had the greatest ability to bioaccumulate the element antimony. In one collection, an "extremely high" level of the element was detected—1423 milligrams of antimony per kilogram of dried mushroom. In comparison, the antimony levels detected in other common terrestrial fungi from the same area, both saprobic and ectomycorrhizal, were more than an order of magnitude smaller.

== See also ==
- List of North American boletes
