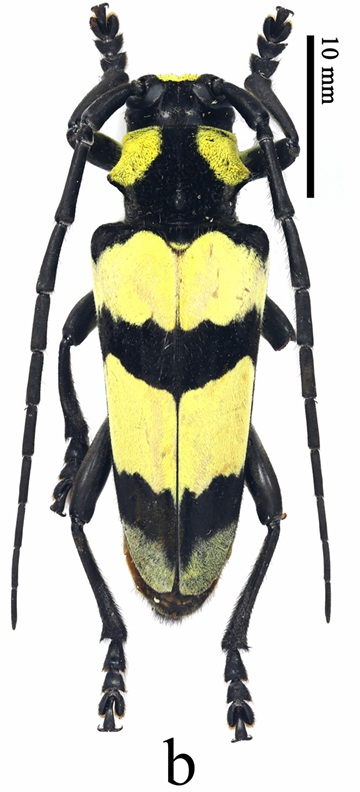

Scientific classification
- Kingdom: Animalia
- Phylum: Arthropoda
- Class: Insecta
- Order: Coleoptera
- Suborder: Polyphaga
- Infraorder: Cucujiformia
- Family: Cerambycidae
- Genus: Thermistis
- Species: T. croceocincta

Binomial name
- Thermistis croceocincta (Saunders, 1839)

Synonyms
- Lamia croceocincta Saunders, 1839; Thermistis apicalis Pic, 1923; Thermistes croceocincta var. rufobasalis Pic 1950

= Thermistis croceocincta =

Species of beetle

Thermistis croceocincta is a species of beetle in the family Cerambycidae. It was described by Saunders in 1839, originally under the genus Lamia. It is known from Laos, China (Chongqing, Shaanxi, Anhui, Zhejiang, Hubei, Jiangxi, Hunan, Fujian, Guangdong, Hainan, Hong Kong, Guangxi, Sichuan, Guizhou, Yunnan), India, Thailand, and Vietnam.

Adults have black bodies with frons, and most of the ventral surfaces are densely clothed with yellow hair. The antennae are deep black.

It feeds on Quercus serrata and Cunninghamia lanceolata.
