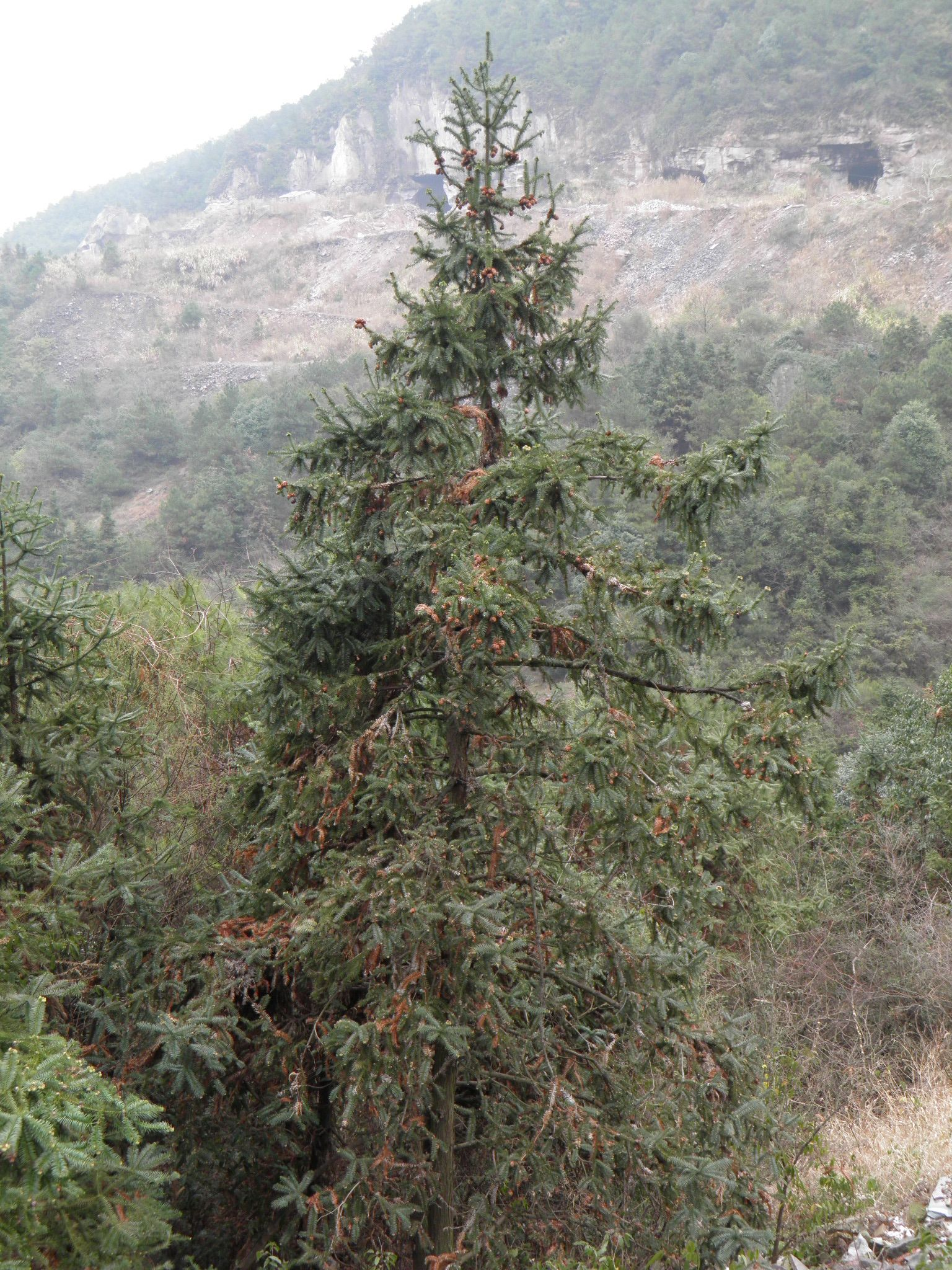
- Cunninghamia lanceolata

Scientific classification
- Kingdom: Plantae
- Clade: Embryophytes
- Clade: Tracheophytes
- Clade: Gymnosperms
- Division: Pinophyta
- Class: Pinopsida
- Order: Cupressales
- Family: Cupressaceae
- Subfamily: Cunninghamioideae (Zucc. ex Endl.) Quinn
- Genus: Cunninghamia; R.Br. ex Richard & Richard

Type species
- Cunninghamia sinensis R.Br. ex Richard & Richard

Species
- C. konishii Hayata; C. lanceolata (Lamb.) Hook.

Synonyms
- Belis Salisb.; Jacularia Raf.; Raxopitys J.Nelson

= Cunninghamia =

Cunninghamia Temporal range: Campanian–Recent

Genus of conifers

Cunninghamia is a genus of one or two living species of evergreen coniferous trees in the cypress family Cupressaceae. They are native to China, northern Vietnam and Laos, and perhaps also Cambodia. They may reach 70 m (230 ft) in height. In vernacular use, it is most often known as Cunninghamia, but is also sometimes called "China-fir" (though it is not a fir). The genus name Cunninghamia honours Dr. James Cunningham, a British doctor who introduced this species into cultivation in 1702 and botanist Allan Cunningham.

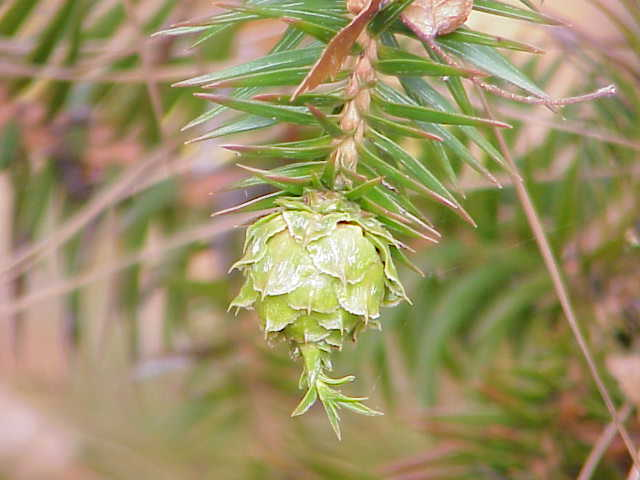
A female cone

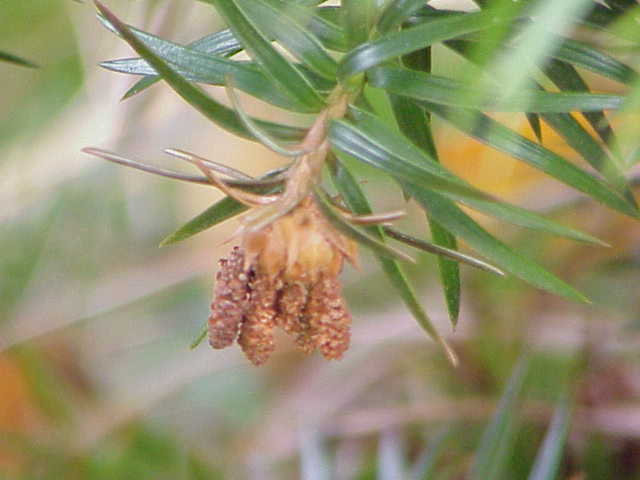
Cluster of male cones

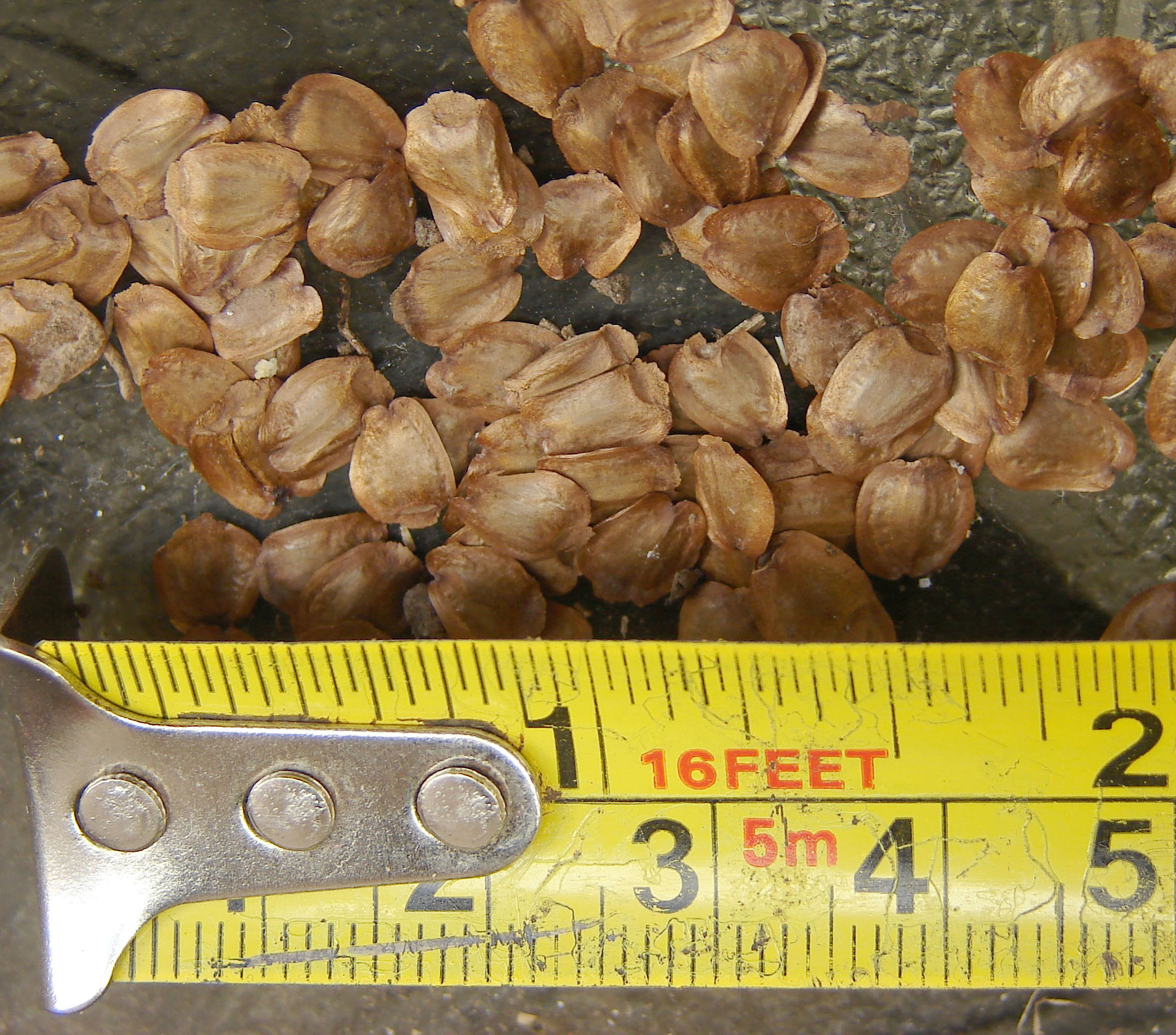
Released seeds collected from the ground

== Description ==
The general shape of the tree is conical with tiered, horizontal branches that are often somewhat pendulous toward the tips. Cunninghamia bears softly spined, leathery, stiff, green to blue-green needle-like leaves that spiral around the stem with an upward arch; they are 2–7cm long and 3–5mm broad at the base, and bear two white or greenish white stomatal bands underneath and sometimes also above. The foliage may turn bronze-tinted in very cold winter weather.

The cones are small and inconspicuous at pollination in late winter, the pollen cones in clusters of 10–30 together, the female cones singly or 2–3 together.

The seed cones mature in 7–8 months to 2.5–4.5cm long, ovoid to globose, with spirally arranged scales; each scale bears 3–5 seeds. They are often proliferous (with a vegetative shoot growing on beyond the tip of the cone) on cultivated trees; this is rare in wild trees, and may be a cultivar selected for easy vegetative propagation for use in forestry plantations.

As the tree grows its trunk tends to sucker around the base, particularly following damage to the stem or roots, and it then may grow in a multi-trunked form. Brown bark of mature trees peels off in strips to reveal reddish-brown inner bark. Older specimens often look ragged, as the old needles may cling to stems for up to 5 years.

Although it resembles conifer species found in much colder climates, the tree is highly tolerant of heat and can be found growing down to sea level in regions such as Hong Kong.

== Taxonomy ==
It is the most basal extant member of the Cupressaceae. Phylogenetic evidence indicates that its lineage diverged from the rest of the family during the early Jurassic. Fossil representatives of the subfamily Cunninghamioideae, of which Cunninghamia is the only living member, extend back to the Middle Jurassic. The subfamily, which has 12 described genera, experienced a high diversity during the Cretaceous, but underwent a severe decline at the end of the Cretaceous, leaving Cunninghamia as the only living genus by the beginning of the Cenozoic.

In the past, the genus was usually treated in the family Taxodiaceae, but this family is now included within the Cupressaceae. A few botanists have also treated it in a family of its own, Cunninghamiaceae, but this is not widely followed. The oldest fossil species of the genus are from the Late Cretaceous (Campanian) of North America, including Cunninghamia hornbyensis from British Columbia, Canada, and Cunninghamia taylorii from the Horseshoe Canyon Formation of Alberta, Canada. Other fossils are known from the Cenozoic of Asia, North America and Europe.

The genus is traditionally said to contain two similar species, Cunninghamia lanceolata and C. konishii, often referred to as the China fir and Taiwan fir, respectively. C. lanceolata occurs in mainland China, Vietnam, and Laos, whereas C. konishii is restricted to Taiwan. However, molecular genetic evidence is suggesting that they are the same species, and that C. konishii of Taiwan derive from multiple colonizations from the mainland. As C. lanceolata was the first name published, this name takes priority if the two are combined. In that case, Taiwan fir becomes Cunninghamia lanceolata var. konishii. However, there is no consensus yet as to whether the two species should be combined.

== Usage ==
Cunninghamia is a prized timber tree in China, producing soft, highly durable scented wood similar to that of Coast Redwood and Sugi. It is used in particular for manufacture of coffins and in temple building where the scent is valued.

Cunninghamia is grown as an ornamental tree in parks and large gardens, where it typically reaches a height of 15–30 m. Due to its heat tolerance, it has been used as a Christmas tree in subtropical areas such as the southern USA.
