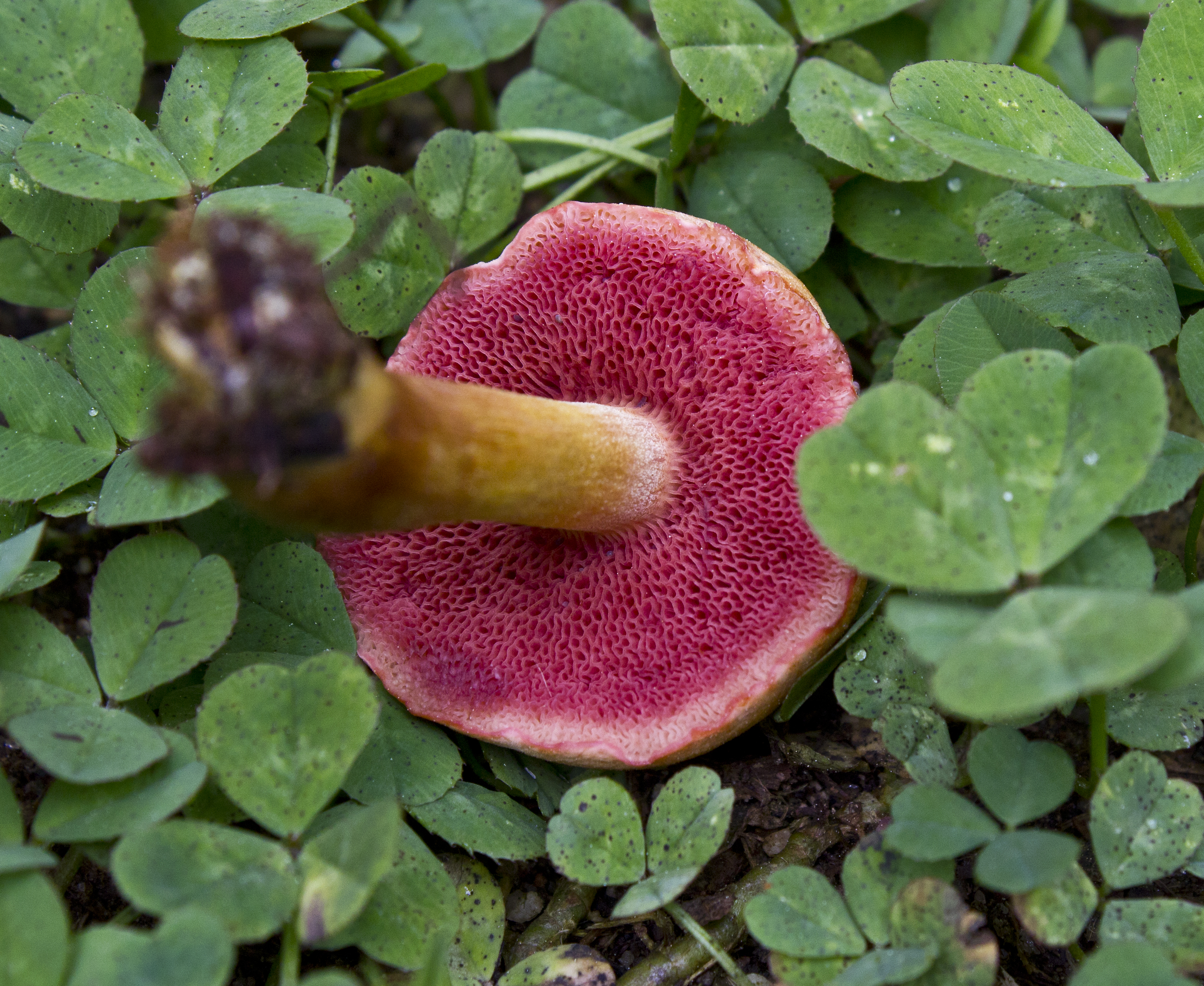

Scientific classification
- Domain: Eukaryota
- Kingdom: Fungi
- Division: Basidiomycota
- Class: Agaricomycetes
- Order: Boletales
- Family: Boletaceae
- Genus: Chalciporus
- Species: C. pseudorubinellus

Binomial name
- Chalciporus pseudorubinellus (A.H.Sm. & Thiers) L.D.Gómez (1997)

Synonyms
- Boletus pseudorubinellus Smith & Thiers (1971)

= Chalciporus pseudorubinellus =

Species of fungus

Chalciporus pseudorubinellus is a bolete fungus of the family Boletaceae. It is found in North America and Central America.

== Taxonomy ==
The bolete was first described in 1971 by mycologists Alexander H. Smith and Harry Delbert Thiers as Boletus pseudorubinellus. The type collection was made in Cheboygan County, near Burt Lake in Michigan. It was transferred to the genus Chalciporus in 1997. Molecular analysis indicates that it is closely related to Chalciporus rubinus.

== Description ==
The fruit body has a yellow to red-pink cap that is 1.5–6 cm (0.6–2.4 in) across and convex in shape, sometimes with a central boss, and ages to a more cinnamon color. The cap surface is smooth and dry but can be slightly sticky when moist. The flesh is yellow and (unlike many other boletes) does not stain blue when cut or bruised. The pores are 1–2 mm wide and irregular, red-pink in younger mushrooms and fading to a yellow- or orange-brown in older specimens. The tubes are 6–10 mm (0.2–0.4 in) long. The pinkish stipe is 3–7 cm (1.2–2.8 in) high and 0.4–1.2 cm (0.16–0.47 in) wide with a yellow base. The mushroom has no obvious smell or taste, although it is edible.

The spores of the bolete are smooth, somewhat spindle shaped, and measure 9–13 by 3–4 μm. The club-shaped basidia (spore-bearing cells) are four-spored and measure 18–26 by 8–10 μm.

== Habitat and distribution ==
Chalciporus pseudorubinellus is found in conifer forests, often among moss, from New York west to Minnesota in North America, the mushrooms appearing from July to September. The type collections was found growing in groups near spruce trees. In Colombia, the bolete is associated with oak.

== See also ==
- List of North American boletes
