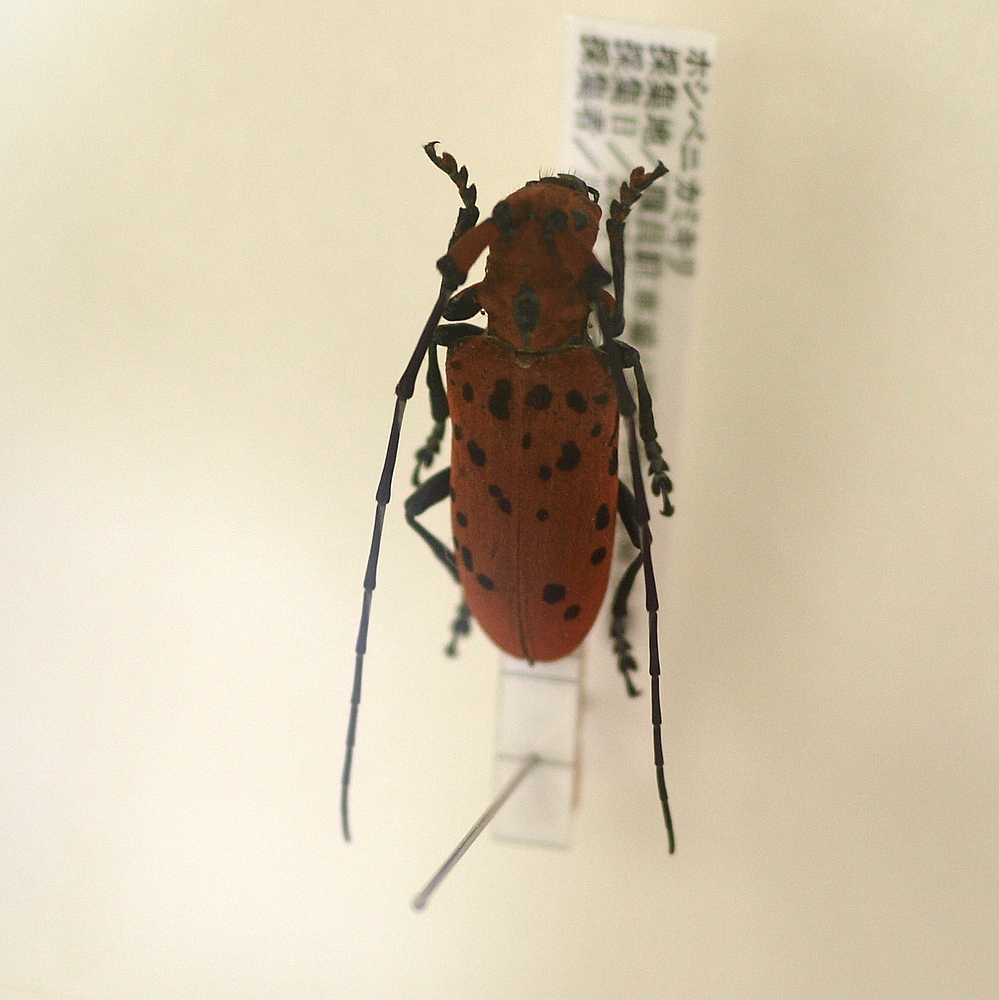
- Eupromus ruber

Scientific classification
- Kingdom: Animalia
- Phylum: Arthropoda
- Class: Insecta
- Order: Coleoptera
- Suborder: Polyphaga
- Infraorder: Cucujiformia
- Family: Cerambycidae
- Subfamily: Lamiinae
- Tribe: Lamiini
- Genus: Eupromus; Pascoe, 1868

= Eupromus =

Genus of beetles

Eupromus is a genus of longhorn beetles of the subfamily Lamiinae, containing the following species:

- Eupromus laosensis Breuning, 1968
- Eupromus nigrovittatus Pic, 1930
- Eupromus ruber (Dalman, 1817)
- Eupromus simeco Holzschuh, 2013
