= Thermistis sagittifera =

Scientific classification
- Kingdom: Animalia
- Phylum: Arthropoda
- Class: Insecta
- Order: Coleoptera
- Suborder: Polyphaga
- Infraorder: Cucujiformia
- Family: Cerambycidae
- Genus: Thermistis
- Species: T. sagittifera

Binomial name
- Thermistis sagittifera Pesarini & Sabbadini, 1999

Species of beetle

Thermistis sagittifera is a species of beetle in the family Cerambycidae. It was described by Pesarini and Sabbadini in 1999.
