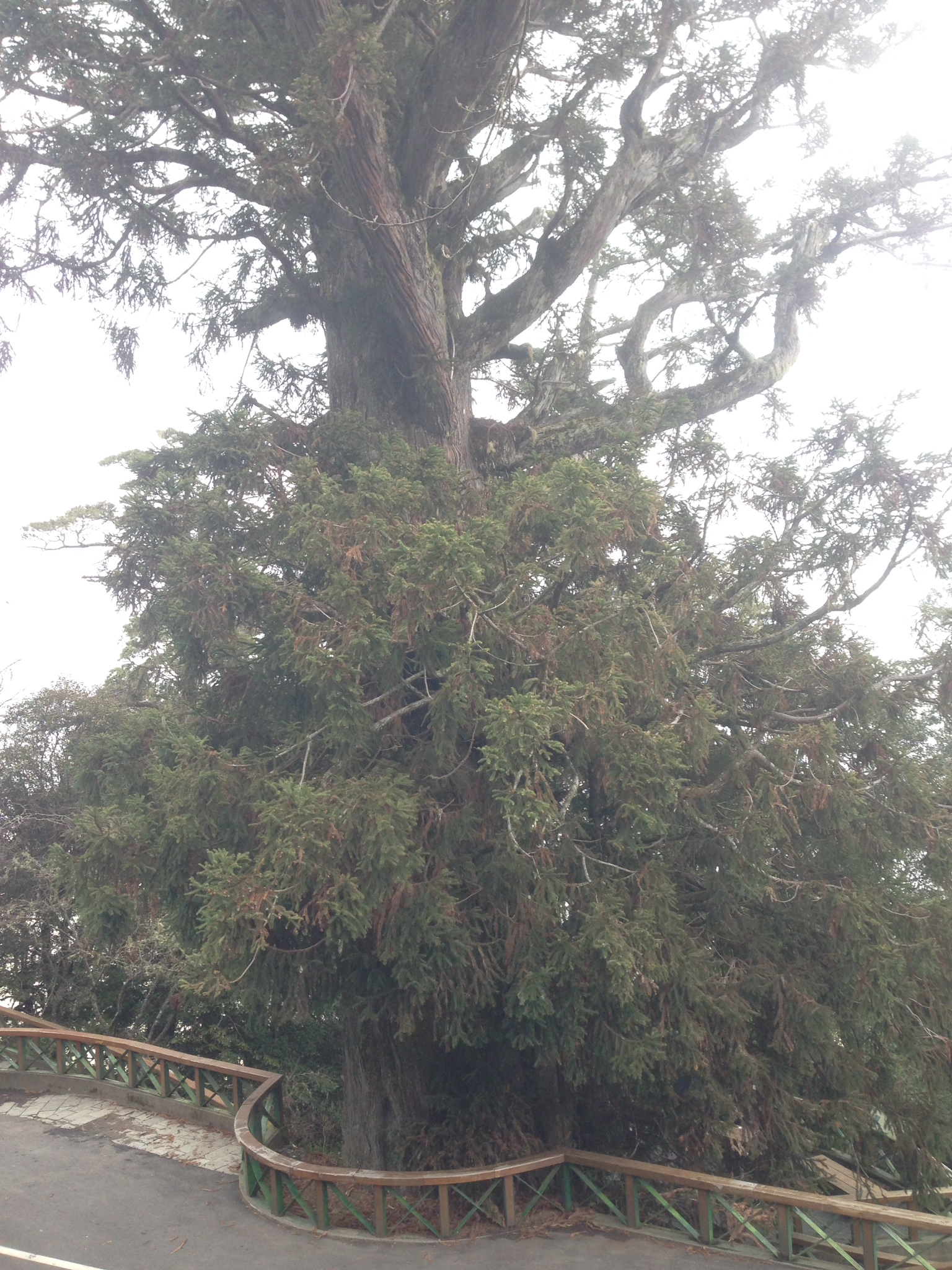
- In Taiwan

Conservation status
- Endangered (IUCN 3.1)

Scientific classification
- Kingdom: Plantae
- Clade: Tracheophytes
- Clade: Gymnospermae
- Division: Pinophyta
- Class: Pinopsida
- Order: Cupressales
- Family: Cupressaceae
- Genus: Cunninghamia
- Species: C. konishii

Binomial name
- Cunninghamia konishii Hayata

Synonyms
- Cunninghamia kawakamii Hayata

= Cunninghamia konishii =

Species of conifer

Cunninghamia konishii, also known as Taiwanese China fir, is an endangered species of tree in the cypress family, Cupressaceae. It is native to southeast China (Fujian), Taiwan, Laos and Vietnam.

== Taxonomy ==
Although C. konishii is treated as a distinct species by many sources, it has also been suggested that it is conspecific with C. lanceolata.
