= Thermistis xanthomelas =

Scientific classification
- Kingdom: Animalia
- Phylum: Arthropoda
- Class: Insecta
- Order: Coleoptera
- Suborder: Polyphaga
- Infraorder: Cucujiformia
- Family: Cerambycidae
- Genus: Thermistis
- Species: T. xanthomelas

Binomial name
- Thermistis xanthomelas Holzschuh, 2007

Species of beetle

Thermistis xanthomelas is a species of beetle in the family Cerambycidae. It was described by Holzschuh in 2007. It is known from China.
