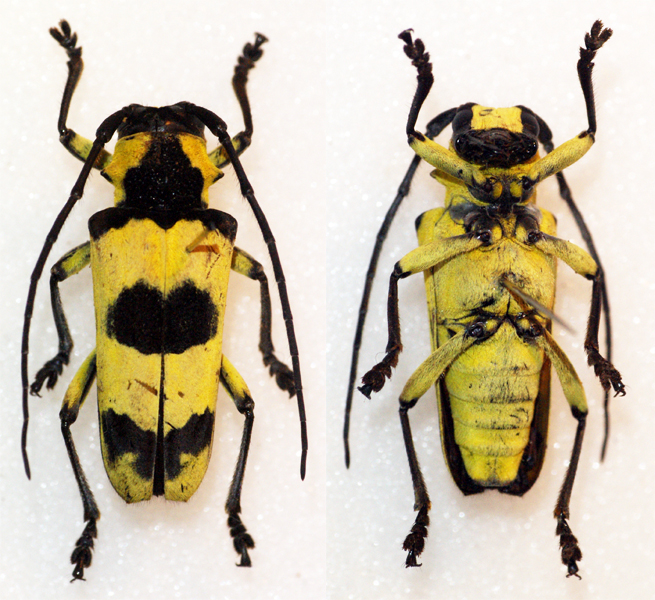
- Thermistis conjuntesignata

Scientific classification
- Kingdom: Animalia
- Phylum: Arthropoda
- Class: Insecta
- Order: Coleoptera
- Suborder: Polyphaga
- Infraorder: Cucujiformia
- Family: Cerambycidae
- Subfamily: Lamiinae
- Tribe: Saperdini
- Genus: Thermistis; Pascoe, 1867

= Thermistis =

Genus of beetles

Thermistis is a genus of longhorn beetles of the subfamily Lamiinae, containing the following species:

- Thermistis croceocincta (Saunders, 1839)
- Thermistis nigromacula Hua, 1990
- Thermistis rubromaculata Pu, 1984
- Thermistis sagittifera Pesarini & Sabbadini, 1999
- Thermistis sulphureonotata Pu, 1984
- Thermistis taiwanensis Nara & Yu, 1992
- Thermistis xanthomelas Holzschuh, 2007
