= Eupromus nigrovittatus =

Scientific classification
- Kingdom: Animalia
- Phylum: Arthropoda
- Class: Insecta
- Order: Coleoptera
- Suborder: Polyphaga
- Infraorder: Cucujiformia
- Family: Cerambycidae
- Genus: Eupromus
- Species: E. nigrovittatus

Binomial name
- Eupromus nigrovittatus Pic, 1930

Synonyms
- Eupromus nigrovittata Pic, 1930 (misspelling)

Species of beetle

Eupromus nigrovittatus is a species of beetle in the family Cerambycidae. It was described by Maurice Pic in 1930. It is known from Vietnam and China. It feeds on Cinnamomum camphora and Tectona grandis.
