= Thermistis nigromacula =

Scientific classification
- Kingdom: Animalia
- Phylum: Arthropoda
- Class: Insecta
- Order: Coleoptera
- Suborder: Polyphaga
- Infraorder: Cucujiformia
- Family: Cerambycidae
- Genus: Thermistis
- Species: T. nigromacula

Binomial name
- Thermistis nigromacula Hua, 1992

Species of beetle

Thermistis nigromacula is a species of beetle in the family Cerambycidae. It was described by Hua in 1992. It is known from Vietnam and China.
