= Chalciporus chontae =

Scientific classification
- Domain: Eukaryota
- Kingdom: Fungi
- Division: Basidiomycota
- Class: Agaricomycetes
- Order: Boletales
- Family: Boletaceae
- Genus: Chalciporus
- Species: C. chontae

Binomial name
- Chalciporus chontae Halling & M. Mata

Species of fungus

Chalciporus chontae is a small pored mushroom of the family Boletaceae native to Costa Rica.
