= Thermistis sulphureonotata =

Scientific classification
- Kingdom: Animalia
- Phylum: Arthropoda
- Class: Insecta
- Order: Coleoptera
- Suborder: Polyphaga
- Infraorder: Cucujiformia
- Family: Cerambycidae
- Genus: Thermistis
- Species: T. sulphureonotata

Binomial name
- Thermistis sulphureonotata Pu, 1984

Species of beetle

Thermistis sulphureonotata is a species of beetle in the family Cerambycidae. It was described by Pu in 1984.
