= Norbadione A =

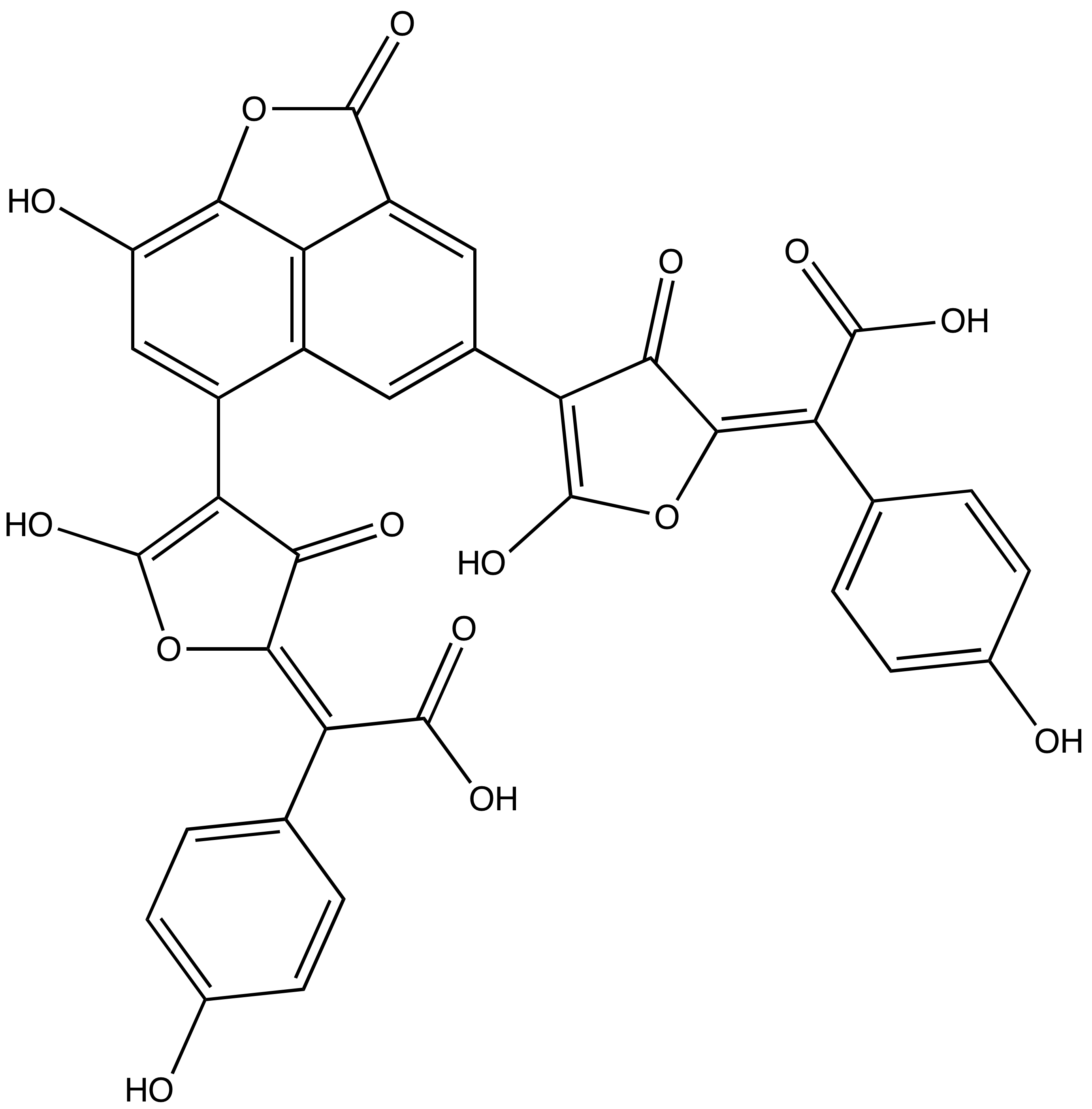

Names
- Preferred IUPAC name [2(3^{2})E,5^{2}(6)E]-1^{4},3^{3},4^{8},5^{3},7^{4}-Pentahydroxy-3^{5},4^{2},5^{5}-trioxo-3^{5}H,4^{2}H,5^{5}H-4(4,6)-naphtho[1,8-bc]furana-3(2,4),5(4,2)-difurana-1,7(1)-dibenzenaheptaphane-2(3^{2}),5^{2}(6)-diene-2,6-dicarboxylic acid

Identifiers
CAS Number	90295-68-4
3D model (JSmol)	Interactive image
ChEBI	CHEBI:210651
ChemSpider	28284768
PubChem CID	54679293
UNII	8DH6BNL8BA
CompTox Dashboard (EPA)	DTXSID301045531
- InChI: InChI=1S/C35H18O15/c36-15-5-1-12(2-6-15)22(31(41)42)29-26(39)21(34(46)49-29)14-9-17-18(11-20(38)28-24(17)19(10-14)33(45)48-28)25-27(40)30(50-35(25)47)23(32(43)44)13-3-7-16(37)8-4-13/h1-11,36-40H,(H,41,42)(H,43,44)/b29-22+,30-23+ Key: NEAFOYGNZAYARY-KBWMUOTDSA-N
- SMILES: O=C(O)C(\c1ccc(O)cc1)=C7\OC(\O)=C(\c2cc(O)c4OC(=O)c3cc(cc2c34)\C6=C(/O)O\C(=C(/c5ccc(O)cc5)C(=O)O)C6=O)C7=O

Properties
Chemical formula	C_{35}H_{18}O_{15}
Molar mass	678.50842 gmol^{−1}
Appearance	red needles
Density	1.902 g/cm^{3}
Melting point	300 °C (572 °F; 573 K)
- Except where otherwise noted, data are given for materials in their standard state (at 25 °C [77 °F], 100 kPa). Infobox references

Norbadione A is a pigment found in the bay bolete mushroom (Boletus badius). A polyphenol, norbadione A is related to a family of mushroom pigments known as pulvinic acids. The molecule has also been reported as a potassium salt from the mushrooms Pisolithus tinctorius (horse dung fungus) and Chalciporus piperatus.

== Properties ==
Norbadione A has seven acid-base functional groups, among which are two enolic and two carboxylic acid moieties. These functional groups confer water-solubility to the molecule. It selectively complexes caesium cations (Cs^{+}), with an efficiency comparable to that of some calixarenes or crown ethers. It has been investigated for its ability to provide a protective effect against the damaging effects of ionizing radiation, an effect attributed to its ability to protect DNA-related targets from irradiation. Tests with cell cultures and mice show that although it has some protective effect, it is toxic to cells in higher doses. A diverse array of synthetic derivatives of norbadione A has been created to explore the effect of structure on antioxidant properties and cytotoxicity. A series of alkali chelators based on the structure of norbadione A has been reported. The intramolecular protonation process has been determined. There is a pH-dependent Z to E isomer switch that occurs in both pulvinate moieties, which yields four stereoisomeric forms (E/E, E/Z, Z/Z, Z/E). These stereoisomers may have a widely differing ability to form complexes with Cs^{+} in solution.

== Synthesis ==
Bourdreux and colleagues reported a total synthesis of norbadione A in 2008. The technique uses a regioselective Diels–Alder reaction and a double Suzuki-Miyaura cross-coupling.
