= Thermistis taiwanensis =

Scientific classification
- Kingdom: Animalia
- Phylum: Arthropoda
- Class: Insecta
- Order: Coleoptera
- Suborder: Polyphaga
- Infraorder: Cucujiformia
- Family: Cerambycidae
- Genus: Thermistis
- Species: T. taiwanensis

Binomial name
- Thermistis taiwanensis Nara & Yu, 1992

Species of beetle

Thermistis taiwanensis is a species of beetle in the family Cerambycidae. It was described by Nara and Yu in 1992. It is known from Taiwan.
