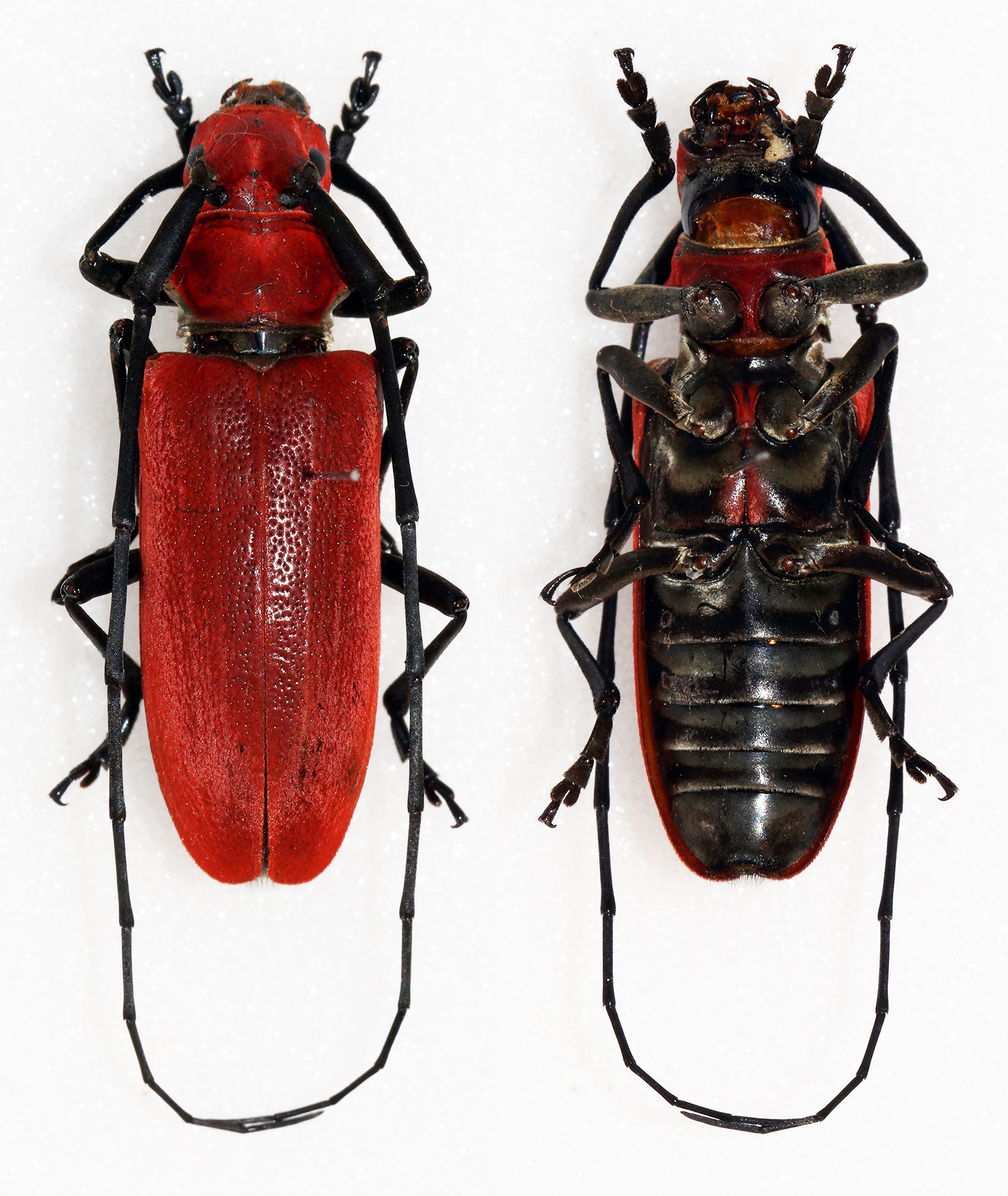

Scientific classification
- Kingdom: Animalia
- Phylum: Arthropoda
- Class: Insecta
- Order: Coleoptera
- Suborder: Polyphaga
- Infraorder: Cucujiformia
- Family: Cerambycidae
- Genus: Eupromus
- Species: E. laosensis

Binomial name
- Eupromus laosensis Breuning, 1968

= Eupromus laosensis =

Species of beetle

Eupromus laosensis is a species of beetle in the family Cerambycidae. It was described by Stephan von Breuning in 1968. It is known from Laos.
