= Eupromus simeco =

Scientific classification
- Kingdom: Animalia
- Phylum: Arthropoda
- Class: Insecta
- Order: Coleoptera
- Suborder: Polyphaga
- Infraorder: Cucujiformia
- Family: Cerambycidae
- Genus: Eupromus
- Species: E. simeco

Binomial name
- Eupromus simeco Holzschuh, 2013

Species of beetle

Eupromus simeco is a species of beetle in the family Cerambycidae. It was described by Holzschuh in 2013 and is known from Laos.
