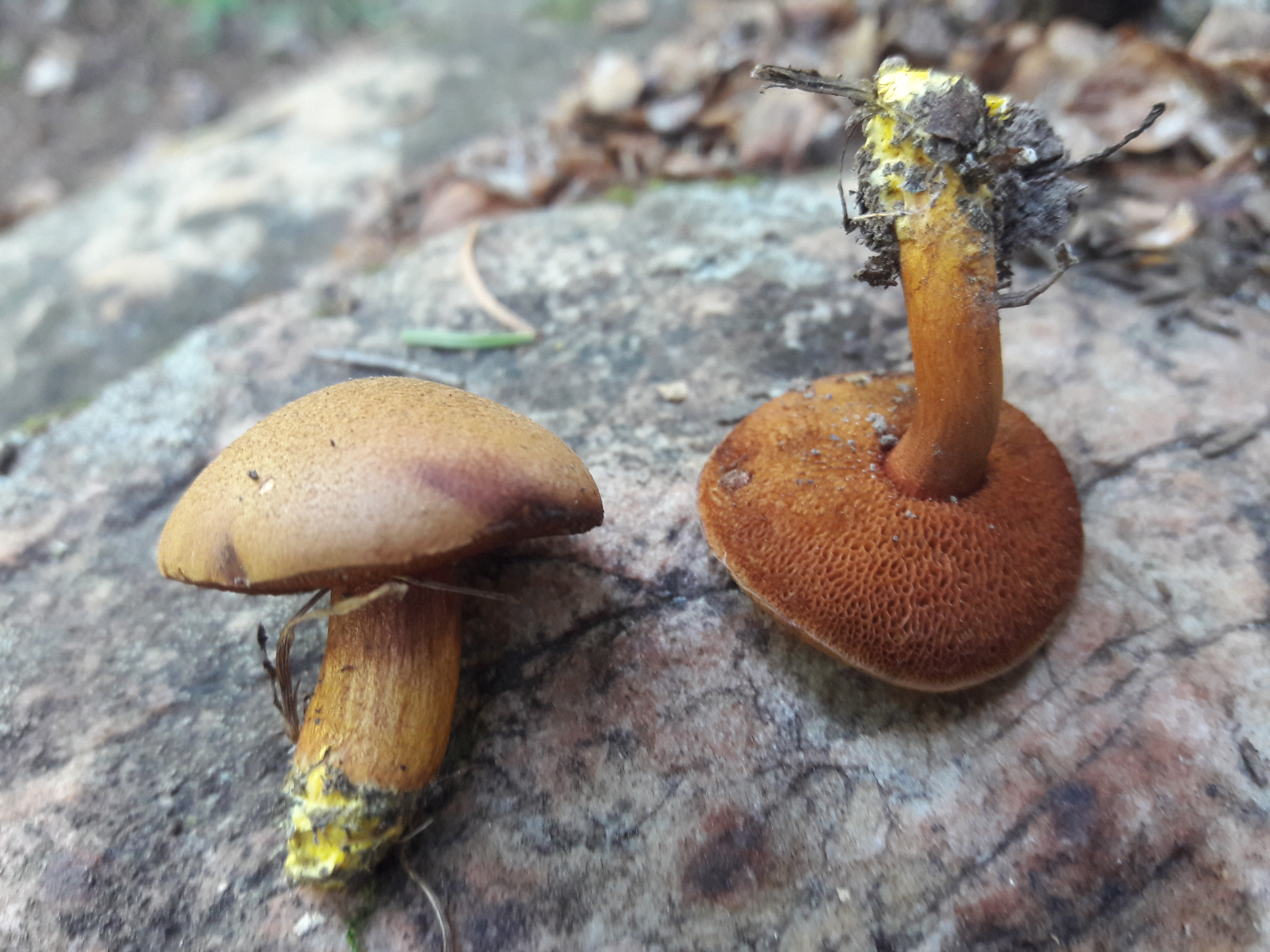

Scientific classification
- Domain: Eukaryota
- Kingdom: Fungi
- Division: Basidiomycota
- Class: Agaricomycetes
- Order: Boletales
- Family: Boletaceae
- Genus: Chalciporus
- Species: C. piperatoides

Binomial name
- Chalciporus piperatoides (Smith & Thiers) Baroni & Both

Synonyms
- Boletus piperatoides Smith & Thiers (1971)

= Chalciporus piperatoides =

Species of fungus

Chalciporus piperatoides is a small-pored species of mushroom in the family Boletaceae. It is found in woodland in North America and closely resembles Chalciporus piperatus but can be distinguished by its flesh and pores staining blue after cutting or bruising. It has a less peppery taste.
