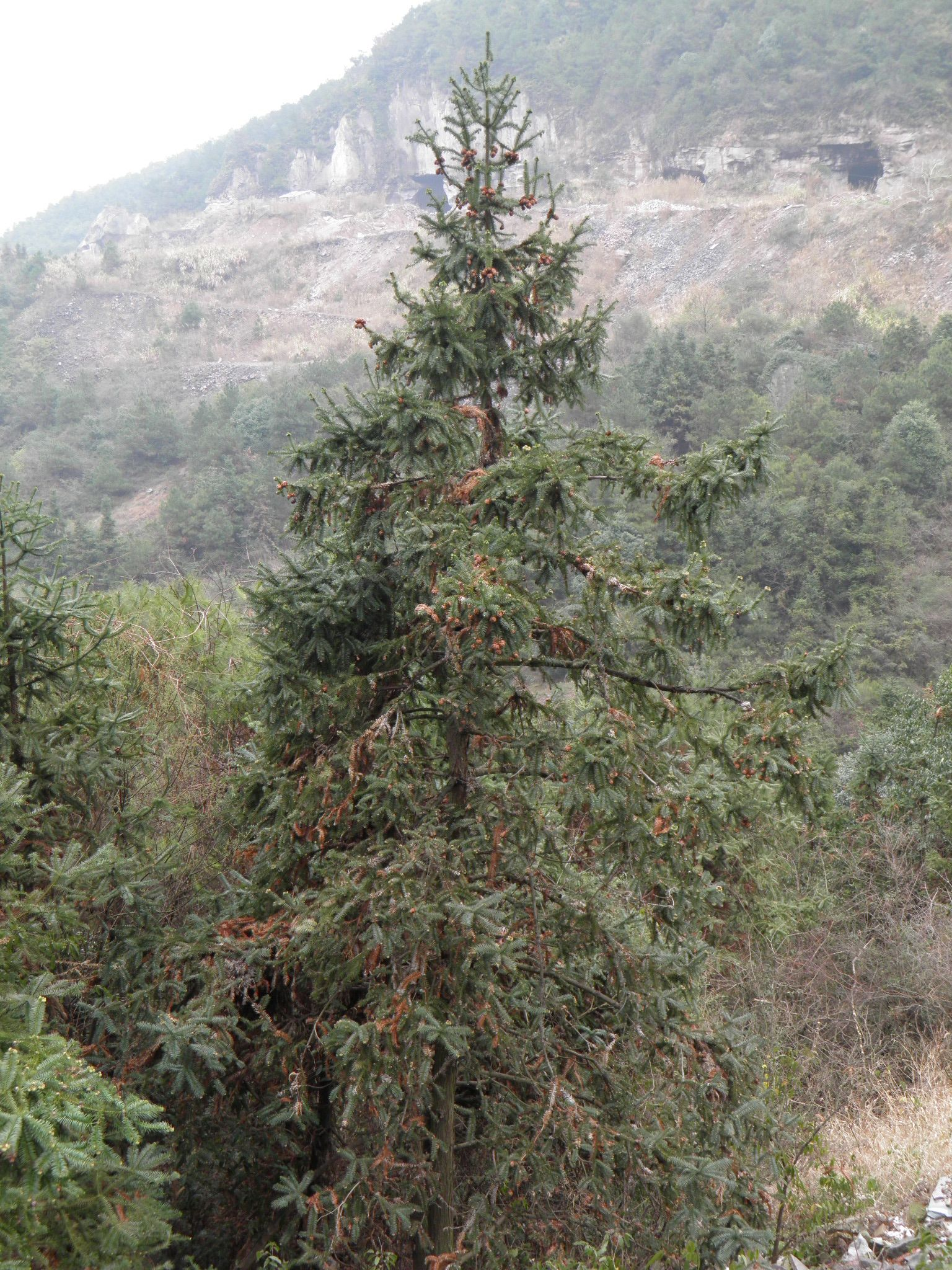

Conservation status
- Least Concern (IUCN 3.1)

Scientific classification
- Kingdom: Plantae
- Clade: Tracheophytes
- Clade: Gymnosperms
- Division: Pinophyta
- Class: Pinopsida
- Order: Cupressales
- Family: Cupressaceae
- Genus: Cunninghamia
- Species: C. lanceolata

Binomial name
- Cunninghamia lanceolata (Lamb.) Hook.

Synonyms
- Abies lanceolata (Lamb.) Poir.; Belis jaculifolia Salisb.; Belis lanceolata (Lamb.) Hoffmanns.; Cunninghamia jaculifolia Druce; Cunninghamia sinensis Rich.; Cunninghamia unicanaliculata D.Y.Wang & H.L.Liu; Larix chinensis Mill.; Pinus abies Lour.; Pinus lanceolata Lamb.; Raxopitys cunninghamii J.Nelson

= Cunninghamia lanceolata =

Species of conifer

Cunninghamia lanceolata, synonyms including Cunninghamia sinensis, commonly known as Chinese fir, is a species of tree in the cypress family, Cupressaceae. It is native to south-central and southeast China. Ornamentally C. lanceolata is commonly planted as a specimen tree in temperate zones.

== Taxonomy ==
Cunninghamia konishii is treated as a distinct species by some sources, although it has also been suggested that it is conspecific with C. lanceolata. Though C. konishii may be treated as the same species, its primary distribution is in Taiwan, where as C. lanceolata is found in mainland China. Cunninghamia lanceolata was originally described in 1827 by English botanist William J. Hooker.

== Description ==
Cunninghamia lanceolata, commonly known as Chinese fir, is a tall conifer able to reach heights of 150 feet (46 meters) in mild climates. In North America, the height typically ranges from 30 to 50 feet (9.1 to 15.2 meters). In native forest land in China heights can reach up to 150 feet (46 meters) and 30 to 70 feet (9.1 to 21.3 meters) in a cultivated forest. The crown of the China Fir forms a pyramidal shape. The bark color typically ranges from dark gray to dark browns. Foliage consist of spiral leaf arrangements of green lanceolate shaped leaves. Male cones form in clusters of 10 to 30 while female cones form in clusters of 2 to 3. Seed cones are small and almost unnoticeable when first pollinated. The cones are mature after 7 months and range in size from 1 to 1.8 inches (2.5 to 4.6 centimetres) in length.

== Distribution ==
Cunninghamia lanceolata is found in central China stretching towards the East Coast of China (including the Fujian, Guangdong, Guangxi, Guizhou, Hubei, Hunan, Jiangxi, Sichuan, Yunnan, Zhejiang regions).

== Ethnobotany ==
In China, C. lanceolata is sought after for its soft yet highly durable wood and having a scent similar to the coast redwood (Sequoia sempervirens) and sugi (Cryptomeria japonica). Cunninghamia lanceolata has been included in Chinese folklore for over 1000 years and the roots, branches, leaves and bark from the tree have been used for pain relief. Recent studies support the use of various parts of C. lanceolata to treat pain as well as rheumatic conditions. Cunninghamia lanceolata heartwood is also notable for its resistance to termites, rot, and numerous fungi.

== Cultivation and usage ==
In China, roughly 30 percent of all timber plantations are composed of C. lanceolata, which covers an estimated 9 million hectares, primarily in southern China. The China fir is responsible for around 25 percent of all Chinese commercial timber production. Within the past 70 years plantations have tripled in area due to widespread planting and reforestation. Cunninghamia lanceolata is also used for carbon sequestration. Under the use of near natural forest management (NNFM), soils have the ability to sequester carbon, and can be utilized to combat climate change. Carbon sequestration from NNFM has been shown to increase carbon stocks in soils with the aid of litter decomposition in topsoil.

Cunninghamia lanceolata 'Glauca', blue China fir, is a horticultural variety that is differentiated by it blueish foliage. It grows similarly to China fir with the exception of better winter hardiness. There are no known pests or diseases of major concern for C. lanceolata. Brown foliage near the bole is caused from the tree holding onto dead needles for a number of years as the autumn season approaches. As China fir matures and grows in height as well as width, the crown opens and spaces out and branches become more pendulous despite forming a pyramidal crown at a younger age.

C. lanceolata wood, which is called shāmù or shānmù (杉木) in Chinese, is one of the primary woods used to produce the guqin zither.
