= Frédéric Bataille =

French educator, poet and mycologist

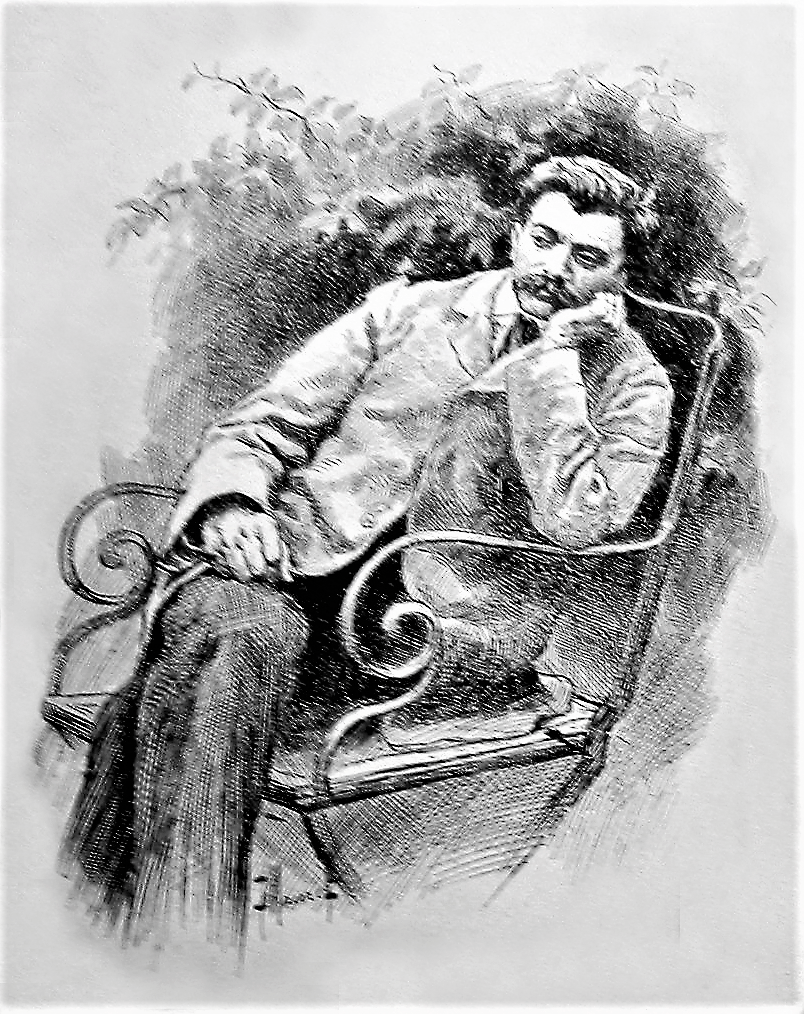
Frédéric Bataille, c. 1893

Frédéric Bataille (French pronunciation: [fʁedeʁik bataj]; born 17 July 1850 in Mandeure, Franche-Comté – died 29 April 1946 in Besançon, Franche-Comté) was a French educator, poet and mycologist.

From 1870 to 1884 he was a schoolteacher in the vicinity of Montbéliard, relocating as an instructor to the lycée at Vanves in 1884. In 1905 he retired from teaching and settled in the city of Besançon. During his career, he was an accomplished poet, publishing books of poetry with titles such as Délassements (1873), Le Pinson de la mansarde (1875), Le clavier d'or (1884), La veille du péché (1886), Poèmes du soir (1889) and Choix de poésies (1892).

Around middle-age he developed a passion for mycology, being heavily influenced by naturalist Lucien Quélet. With Quélet, he was co-author of a monograph involving the genera Amanita and Lepiota, titled Flore monographique des Amanites et des Lépiotes. Bataille served as vice-president of the Société mycologique de France and president of the Société d'émulation du Doubs.

In mycological taxonomy, he is commemorated with the specific name of bataillei.

== Selected writings in mycology ==
- Les Bolets, classification et détermination des espèces. Bulletin de la Société d'histoire naturelle du Doubs, n° 15, 30 p. (1908) – Boletes, classification and determination of species.
- Champignons rares des environs de Besançon. Bulletin de la Société d'histoire naturelle du Doubs, n° 16, mai-décembre, 7 p. (1909) – Rare mushrooms in the vicinity of Besançon.
- Flore analytique des morilles et des helvelles. Besançon, l'auteur, 44 p. (1911) – Analyses of Morchella and Helvella.
- Les Réactions macrochimiques chez les champignons, suivies d'indications sur la morphologie des spores. Paris, P. Lechevallier, 172 p. (1948) – Macrochemical reactions involving mushrooms, etc.
