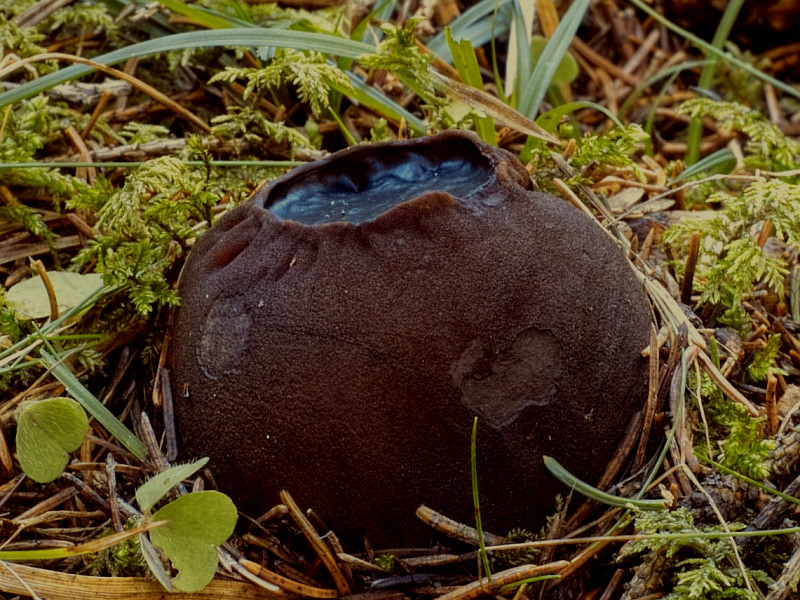
- Sarcosoma globosum

Scientific classification
- Kingdom: Fungi
- Division: Ascomycota
- Class: Pezizomycetes
- Order: Pezizales
- Family: Sarcosomataceae
- Genus: Sarcosoma; Casp. (1891)

Type species
- Sarcosoma globosum (Schmidel) Rehm (1891)

= Sarcosoma =

Genus of fungi

Sarcosoma is a genus of fungi in the family Sarcosomataceae. The name Sarcosoma is derived from ancient Greek and means "fleshy body", from σάρξ (sárx, "flesh") σῶμα (sôma, "body"). The genus is widespread in north temperate areas.

== Discovery and taxonomy ==
The type species of the genus is Sarcosoma globosum and was first described as Burcardia globosum by Schmidel in 1793. In 1891, Caspary proposed the new combination of Sarcosoma globosum. In 1947, Marcelle le Gal attempted to erect the family Sarcoscyphaceae making Sarcosoma the type genus. In doing so, she placed the discomycetes with an apothecia she called "sub-operculate" in this family.

In 1957, Richard P. Korf pointed out that Kobayasi had already described the same family under the name Sarcosomataceae in 1937, with Sarcosoma as the type. In the same publication, Korf also transferred four species into a separate genus, one that he named Galiella, honoring Le Gal for her dedicated work.

Boedijn questioned Korf's decision and claimed that all Sarcosoma except S. globosum fit Korf's description of Galiella, making the new genus superfluous.

In 1983, after further studying of Sarcosomataceae, Sarcosoma was suggested monotypic with S. globosum as the sole species in the genus, which still is supported since it forms a separate phylogenetic lineage in a Bayesian inference consensus tree using two different genes (ITS and 18S ribosomal RNA).

Since the first description of Sarcosoma, many species have been placed there and later moved to other genera upon further analysis both within and outside of Sarcosomataceae. This includes: Sarcosoma espeletiae, a rejected combination, as the type-material fits the description of Bulgaria; Sarcosoma latahense, which is now considered a synonym to Pseudosarcosoma latahensis and placed in the family Choriactidaceae and Sarcosoma orientale, suggested to fit in Galiella, although it has not yet been officially transferred due to the lack of molecular evidence to support this placement. Although Boedijn already in 1959 questioned why Korf did not transfer S. orientale when he described Galiella.

There is still a lot of uncertainty regarding where to place the remaining taxa, and currently 16 species are recognized by the Catalogue of Life, despite the claims that the genus is monotypic. The genus cannot be deemed monotypic until these additional 15 species are better studied by collecting new material to compare with type material as well as employing molecular methods to know where they belong. Regardless, several specialists who have studied Sarcosoma have already concluded that S. globosum is morphologically different to other species in Sarcosomataceae.

== Description ==
The genus is characterized by the dark brown or black apothecium which is gelatinous or leathery and releases a watery liquid when cut, and by having monilioid external hairs and smooth spores. The type species for the genus (Sarcosoma globosum) has large round/cylindrical fruiting bodies (5–12 cm in width).

== Distribution range and ecology ==
The type species S. globosum is best known from northern Europe but is also found In North America and Russia. In western Siberia, it was found in both swamped areas and well-drained areas. In the swamped areas, it was found in elevated parts near roots and tree trunks with moss. Pinus sibirica, Picea obovata, and Abies sibirica dominated the swamped areas, while in the well drained areas, the deciduous trees Betula pendula and Populus tremula were also present. Sarcosoma globosum is listed as vulnerable by the Swedish red list.

Being typically found in old spruce forests, it is believed that they decompose spruce litter to obtain nutrients. However, as they are often found on spruce roots, it is also a possibility that they form ectomycorrhiza, but their nutritional mode has not been adequately studied to conclude this.

== Reproduction and spore dispersal ==
The timing of the development of the Ascocarp for S. globosum in west Siberia has been studied, finding that they start to emerge in May being globe shaped with an underdeveloped disc and dense gel inside. By the middle of June, they are fully developed, the surface is wrinkled, and the contents turn into liquid. By the end of June, the disc edges become wavy and flat before the apothecium disappears by the middle of July. While in Southern Sweden, the fruiting bodies start to develop when the snow melts, typically between February and May. S. globosum is found most abundantly after mild winters with a lot of snow and can then form large aggregations. Their abundance varies greatly from year to year and is negatively impacted by clear felling forestry.

The ascospores are dispersed by wind, and in order to reach as far as possible, they are flung into the air by the ascus using a mechanism that is triggered by heat that it gets from the sun. The dark colour of the apothecium likely makes it heat up quickly as the colour absorbs most of the sunlight. It is also possible to induce the spore dispersal in a mature ascocarp by warming it with your hands until the spores are released in a dark cloud.

== Placement in the tree of life ==
Based on an analysis using Maximum Parsimony on two different genes (ITS and 18S ribosomal RNA), Sarcosoma is placed as follows in relation to other genera in the family Sarcosomataceae:

- Sarcosomataceae
  - Chorioactidaceae
  - - Donadinia
    - - - Pseudoplectania
        - Sarcosoma
      - - Galiella
        - - Urnula
          - Plectania

== Species ==
- Sarcosoma globosum
- Sarcosoma carolinianum
- Sarcosoma decaryi
- Sarcosoma espeletiae
- Sarcosoma fibula
- Sarcosoma godronioides
- Sarcosoma le-ratii
- Sarcosoma moelleriana
- Sarcosoma novoguineense
- Sarcosoma orientale
- Sarcosoma sarasinii
- Sarcosoma tetrasporum
- Sarcosoma turbinatum
- Sarcosoma umbrinum
- Sarcosoma wettsteinii
- Sarcosoma zelandicum
