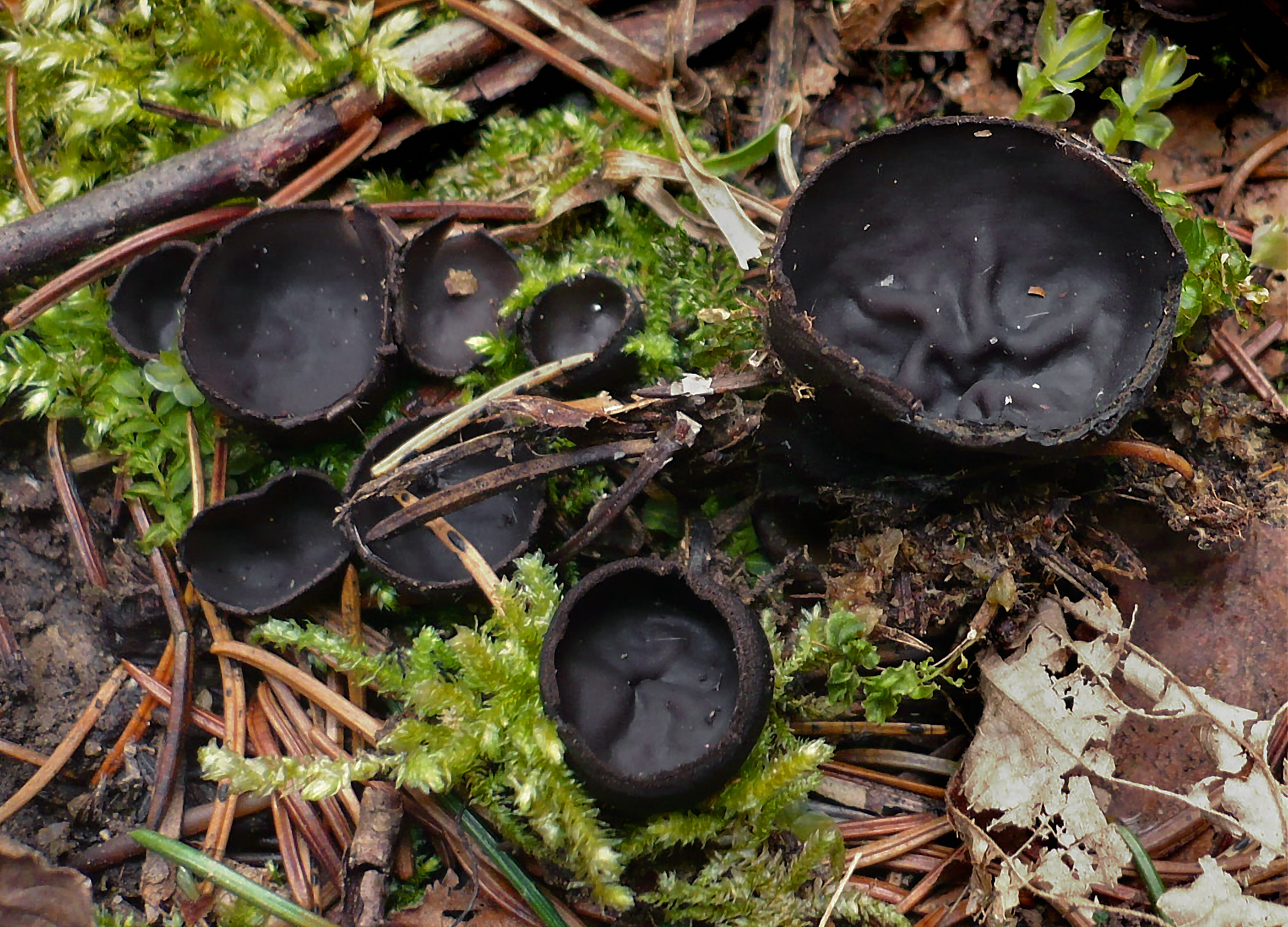
- Pseudoplectania nigrella

Scientific classification
- Kingdom: Fungi
- Division: Ascomycota
- Class: Pezizomycetes
- Order: Pezizales
- Family: Sarcosomataceae
- Genus: Pseudoplectania; Fuckel (1870)

Type species
- Pseudoplectania nigrella (Pers.) Fuckel (1870)

Synonyms
- Melascypha Boud. (1885)

= Pseudoplectania =

Genus of fungi

Pseudoplectania is a genus of fungi in the family Sarcosomataceae. The genus contains 12 species. Pseudoplectania ryvardenii was described in 2012, while Pseudoplectania carranzae was transferred to the genus (from Plectania) in 2013.

== Taxonomy ==
The genus was circumscribed by the German botanist Fuckel in 1870, who originally included the two species Pseudoplectania nigrella and P. fulgens. In 1889, Pier Andrea Saccardo removed the latter species from the genus, making it the type species of his newly created Otidella (now considered synonymous with Caloscypha as described by Boudier in 1885). Saccardo added the species Pseudoplectania melania and P. stygia, the latter of which is thought to be synonymous with P. nigrella.

Phylogenetic analysis based on the DNA sequences of ribosomal RNA suggests that Pseudoplectania groups in a clade together with Galiella, Plectania, Urnula, Sarcosoma, and Donadinia, and that it is most closely related to the latter genus. Pseudoplectania differs from Plectania mainly in spore shape—spherical in Pseudoplectania compared to ellipsoidal in Plectania.

The generic name means false plectania.

== Description ==
The fruit bodies of Plectania fungi grow either in groups or scattered apart, with stems or without (sessile), and are large and fleshy. They are covered on the external surfaces with short, slender, flexuous (bendy) and often coiled or twisted hairs that sometimes give the exterior of the cup a tomentose appearance—covered with dense, matted hairs. The spore-bearing cells, the asci, range in shape from cylindrical to club-shaped, and they are eight-spored. The spores are perfectly spherical, smooth, and hyaline (translucent). The paraphyses may be either straight or curved.

== Species ==
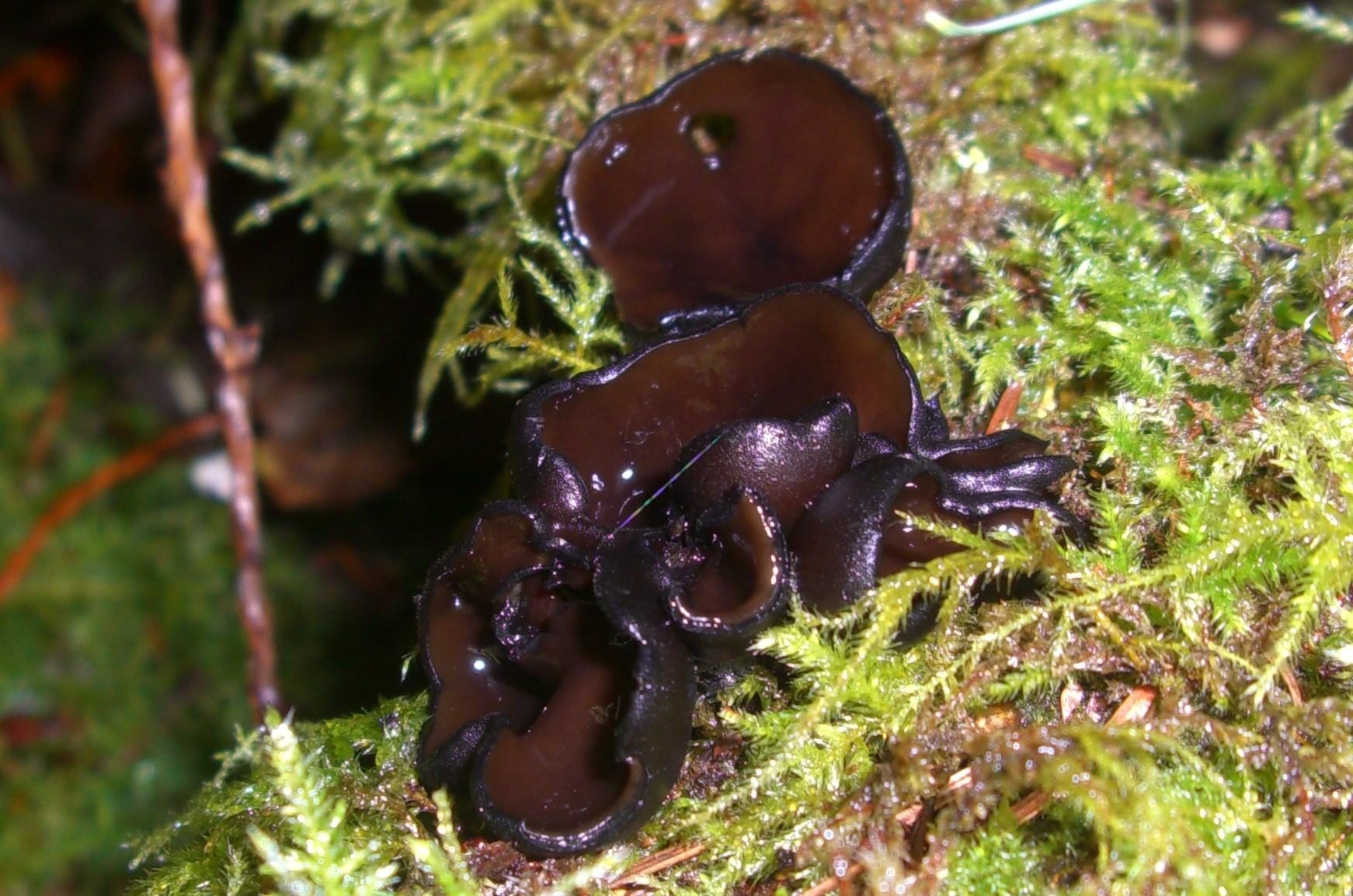
Pseudoplectania melaena

Twelve species are accepted in the genus:

- Pseudoplectania affinis
- Pseudoplectania carranzae – Costa Rica
- Pseudoplectania kumaonensis – India
- Pseudoplectania lignicola, described in 2015, is found in Slovakia and the Czech Republic. It differs morphologically from other Pseudoplectania species by the centrally arranged spherical membranous sheath that surrounds the spores, and the thick ectal excipulum of oblong cells at the base of the apothecia.
- Pseudoplectania melaena
- Pseudoplectania nigrella, the type species, has a worldwide distribution. Among its common names are the "hairy black cup".
- Pseudoplectania sphagnophila resembles P. nigrella but has a more deeply and persistently cup-shaped fruit body, a short but distinct stem, and grows solely amongst sphagnum moss.
- Pseudoplectania stygia
- Pseudoplectania ryvardenii – Venezuela
- Pseudoplectania sphagnophila
- Pseudoplectania tasmanica
- Pseudoplectania vogesiaca has fruit bodies with long stems, and is covered with a thin layer of straight or slightly flexuous hairs.
