= Urnula helvelloides =

Scientific classification
- Kingdom: Fungi
- Division: Ascomycota
- Class: Pezizomycetes
- Order: Pezizales
- Family: Sarcosomataceae
- Genus: Urnula
- Species: U. helvelloides

Binomial name
- Urnula helvelloides Donadini, Berthet & Astier (1973)

Synonyms
- Plectania helvelloides (Donadini, Berthet & Astier) Donadini (1987); Donadinia helvelloides (Donadini, Berthet & Astier) Bellem. & Mel.-Howell (1990); Neournula helvelloides (Donadini, Berthet & Astier) W.Y.Zhuang (1998)

Species of fungus

Urnula helvelloides is a species of fungus in the family Sarcosomataceae, first described in 1973 from southern France. The fungus forms distinctive cup-shaped fruit bodies measuring 2–2.5 centimetres in diameter, with a dark brown to black exterior and a black spore-bearing surface with a subtle reddish tinge, mounted on a slender stalk 3–5 centimetres long. It grows on dead yew branches partially buried in humus within mixed beech-yew-oak forests, fruiting between January and April at elevations of 650–700 metres.

== Taxonomy ==
Urnula helvelloides was formally described in March 1973 by Jean‑Claude Donadini, Paul Berthet and Joseph Astier in the Bulletin mensuel de la Société linnéenne de Lyon. The specific epithet helvelloides alludes to its superficial resemblance to species in the genus Helvella. Based on morphological characters—including operculate (lid‑bearing) asci and spore ornamentation—it was placed in the family Sarcosomataceae, suborder Sarcoscyphineae and tribe Urnuleae. Although the cyanophilous (cotton‑blue staining) spore warts resemble those of the tribe Galielleae, the authors retained the new species in the genus Urnula pending further revision.

== Description ==
The fruit bodies (apothecia) begin as narrow, stalked tubes with a small apical opening, then develop into stout, cup‑shaped structures that never fully flatten. Cups measure 2–2.5 cm in diameter and up to 1.5 cm in height, with a well‑developed sterile margin forming a persistent rim. The exterior surface is matt and uniformly dark brown to black, while the hymenium (spore‑bearing surface) appears black with a subtle reddish tinge.

The stipe is slender (3–4 mm thick), proportionally long (3–5 cm), often laterally compressed and longitudinally ridged. It emerges from a tuft of byssoid (cotton‑like) black mycelium. In cross section, the medullary (inner) zone is whitish, surrounded by a black cortical layer.

Under the microscope, the cylindrical ascus measures 400–420 μm by 12–13 μm and bears an eccentrically attached operculum (lid). The spores are ovoid, 22–28 by 9–13 μm, with low verrucae (small warts) that stain blue with lactophenol cotton blue (cyanophilous) and contain 1–3 oil droplets. Sterile filaments called paraphyses are linear, often forking near the tip, and measure 400–420 by 2–3 μm. The subhymenial layer consists of a dense, gelified network of hyphae (textura intricata) beneath a thin layer of angular hyphae (textura angularis). The stipe cortex comprises heavily pigmented hyphae arranged longitudinally, while the medullary hyphae are hyaline and interwoven.

== Ultrastructure ==
The spore‑bearing sacs (asci) of Urnula helvelloides open at the apex by a lid‑like structure called an operculum. Immediately beneath the operculum the ascus wall thickens and is divided into two very fine sublayers. The outer sublayer stains intensely with lactophenol cotton blue, indicating a high polysaccharide content, while the inner sublayer forms a thin, less reactive cupola. Below this region the wall narrows again into a single, more uniform layer before tapering into the stipe of the ascus.

Each ascospore is enclosed in a stratified wall consisting of three main parts. The innermost proper wall is differentiated into three sublayers of differing thickness and stain‑reactivity. Surrounding this is a very thin intermediate layer, and beyond that an external perispore ("spore jacket") of irregular thickness. The perispore surface bears low, wart‑like ornamentation that also colours with lactophenol cotton blue, giving the spores their characteristic rough appearance under the microscope.

Among the asci lie sterile, filamentous cells called paraphyses, which are long, slender and often forked or knotted at the tips. These contain large vacuoles filled with pigmented granules. In contrast, the hymenial hairs (specialised hyphae forming the cup margin) are narrower, unbranched and lack the prominent vacuoles seen in paraphyses.

== Habitat and distribution ==
Urnula helvelloides grows saprophytically on dead branches of Taxus baccata (yew) that are often partially buried in humus within mixed beech‑yew‑oak forests. Fruiting bodies appear as early as January and develop through February to April at elevations of 650–700 m. At the time of its original publication, the species was only known from the type locality on the north slope of the Sainte-Baume massif in the Var department of southern France.
