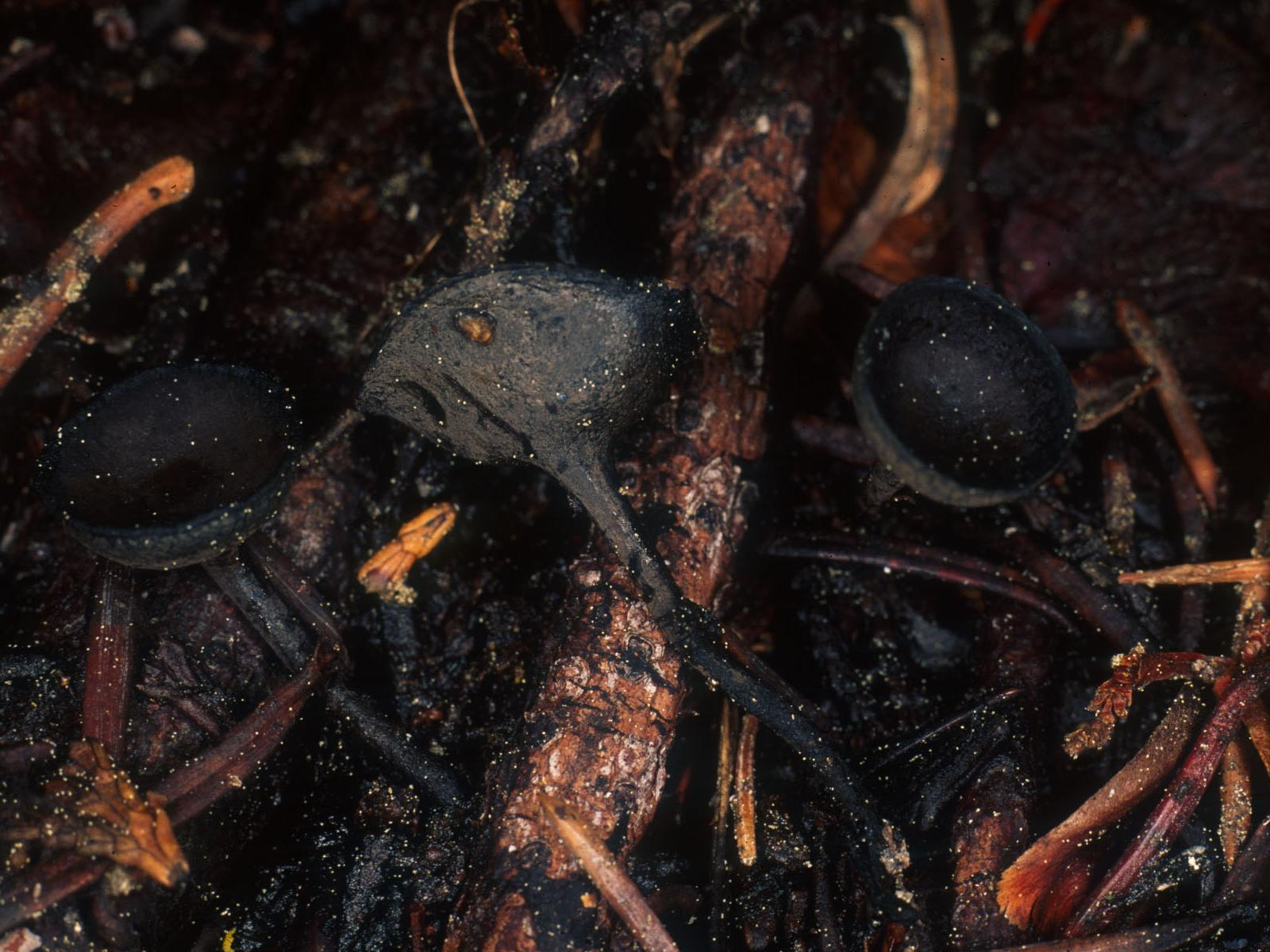

Scientific classification
- Domain: Eukaryota
- Kingdom: Fungi
- Division: Ascomycota
- Class: Pezizomycetes
- Order: Pezizales
- Family: Sarcosomataceae
- Genus: Plectania
- Species: P. nannfeldtii

Binomial name
- Plectania nannfeldtii Korf (1957)

Synonyms
- Paxina nigrella Seaver (1928); Macropodia nigrella (Seaver) Teng (1963); Helvella nigrella (Seaver) F.L.Tai (1979); Macroscyphus nigrellus (Seaver) Z.S.Bi (1990)

= Plectania nannfeldtii =

Species of fungus

Plectania nannfeldtii Mycological characteristics
- Smooth hymenium
- No distinct cap
- Hymenium attachment is irregular or not applicable
- Stipe is bare
- Spore print is white
- Ecology is saprotrophic
- Edibility is unknown

Plectania nannfeldtii, commonly known as Nannfeldt's Plectania, the black felt cup, or the black snowbank cup fungus, is a species of fungus in the family Sarcosomataceae. The fruit bodies of this species resemble small, black, goblet-shaped shallow cups up to 3 cm (1 1/8 in) wide, with stems up to 4 cm (1 5/8 in) long attached to black mycelia.

The fruit bodies, which may appear alone or in groups on the ground in conifer duff, are usually attached to buried woody debris, and are commonly associated with melting snow. Plectania nannfeldtii is found in western North America and in Asia, often at higher elevations. Similar black cup fungi with which P. nannfeldtii may be confused include Pseudoplectania vogesiaca, P. nigrella, and Helvella corium.

== Taxonomy ==
The species was first described by British mycologist Fred Jay Seaver in 1928, who called it Paxina nigrella in his monograph of the cup fungi of North America. The type specimens were found in 1914 in Tolland, Colorado, by mycologist Lee Oras Overholts; further collections were reported from Colorado and California in 1930. The species has also been referred to as Macropodia nigrella, Helvella nigrella, and Macroscyphus nigrellus.

In 1957 Richard P. Korf transferred the species to its current name, changing the specific epithet in the process as Plectania nigrella was already in use (it is a synonym of Pseudoplectania nigrella). The name chosen by Korf honors the Swedish mycologist John Axel Nannfeldt, responsible for some early advances in the understanding of this fungus and other cup fungi. P. nannfeldtii is classified in Korf's section Plectania of the genus Plectania because of its ellipsoid ascospores. Vernacular names for the species include the "black felt cup", "Nannfeldt's Plectania", or the "black snowbank cup fungus".

== Description ==
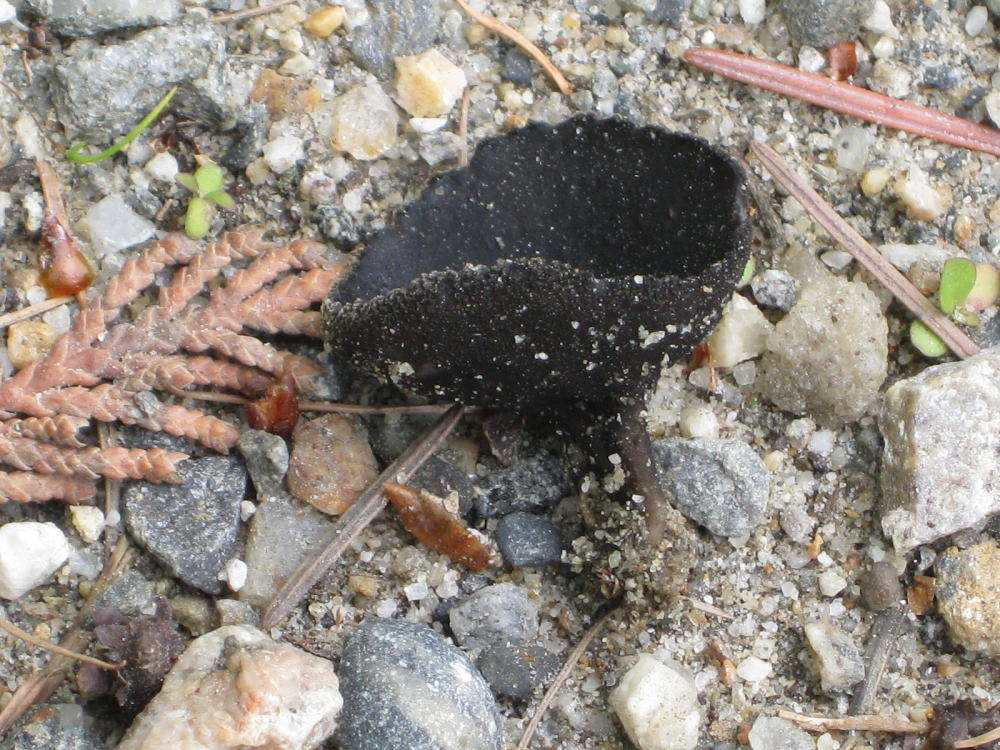
Fruit bodies grow on rotting wood.

The fruit body is shallowly cup- or goblet-shaped and may be up to 3 cm (1 1/8 in) in diameter. The edges of the cup are somewhat wavy, and remain curled inward until they flare out when they are very old. The external surface is covered with delicate blackish-brown hairs, while the color of the surface underneath is also brownish-black. The surface wrinkles when the fruit body is dry. The internal, convex surface of the cup contains the spore-producing tissue layer known as the hymenium; it is black. The stem is thin and may be up to 4 cm (1 5/8 in) long with a diameter of 2–3 mm, tapering towards the base. Like the fruit body, it is covered in delicate brownish-black hairs, and it is similar in color to the outer surface of the cup. The dense, coarse mycelium at the base of the stem is black. The flesh is thin and blackish-gray.

Edibility has not been determined for this species.

=== Microscopic features ===
In mass, the spores are white. The spores are hyaline (translucent), ellipsoid, with dimensions of 30–35 by 15 μm. Opinions are divided about the distribution of oil droplets in the spores: Miller says that the spores typically have two oil droplets at either end, Trudell and Ammirati, in their field guide to mushrooms of the Pacific Northwest, says that the spores "lack large oil drops", while Evenson claims that there are "numerous tiny oil drops." The walls of the spores have thin horizontal ridges that are cyanophilic, that is, they are visible with light microscopy when stained with methyl blue. The spore-bearing cells, the asci, are about 500 μm long and 20 μm wide. The asci are operculate, that is, with a flap at one end that opens to discharge the spores. Interspersed between the asci are numerous sterile, filamentous dark-brown cells called paraphyses that are slightly enlarged on one end, and 380–420 μm long by 4–5 μm wide.

=== Similar species ===
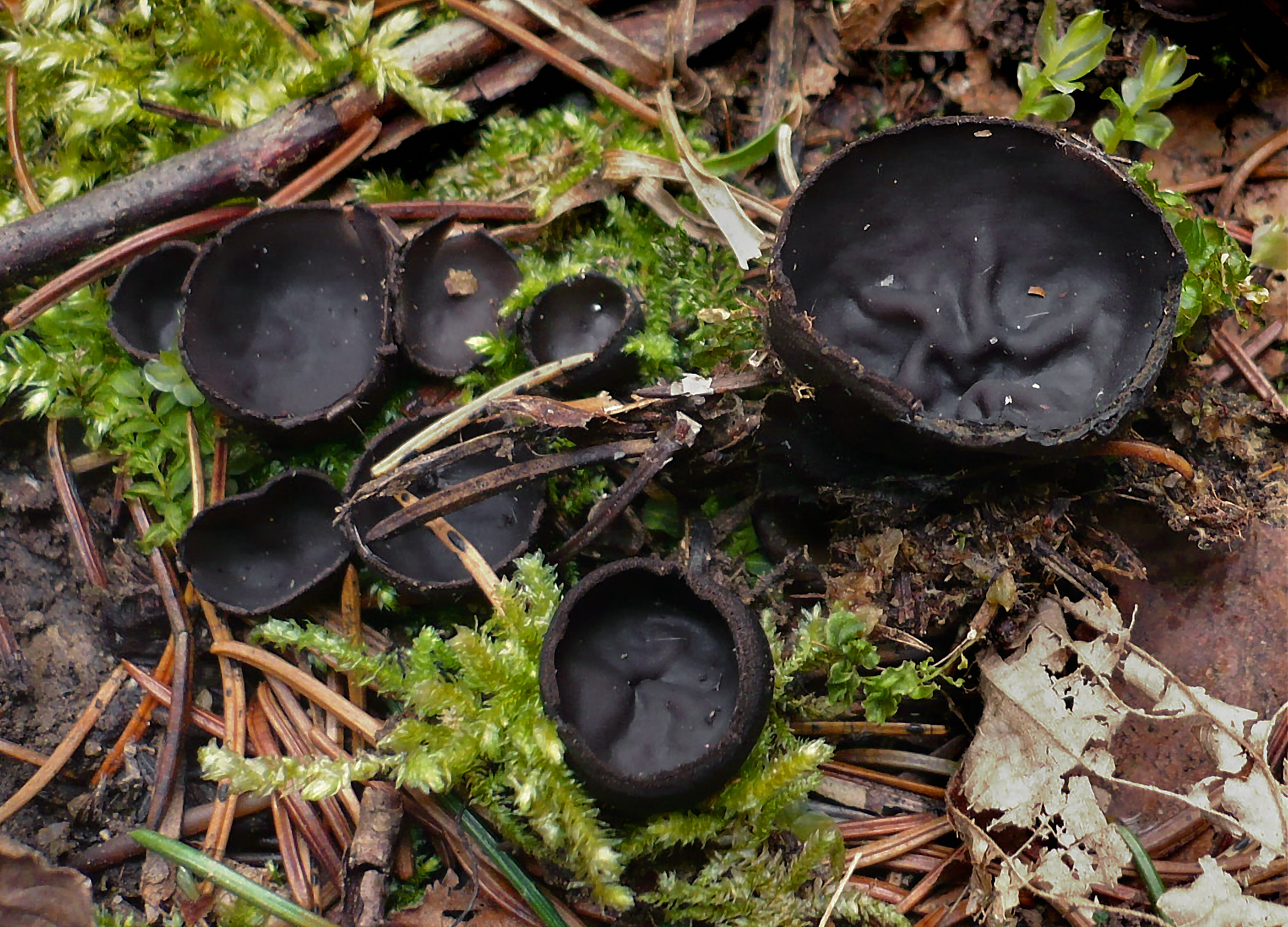
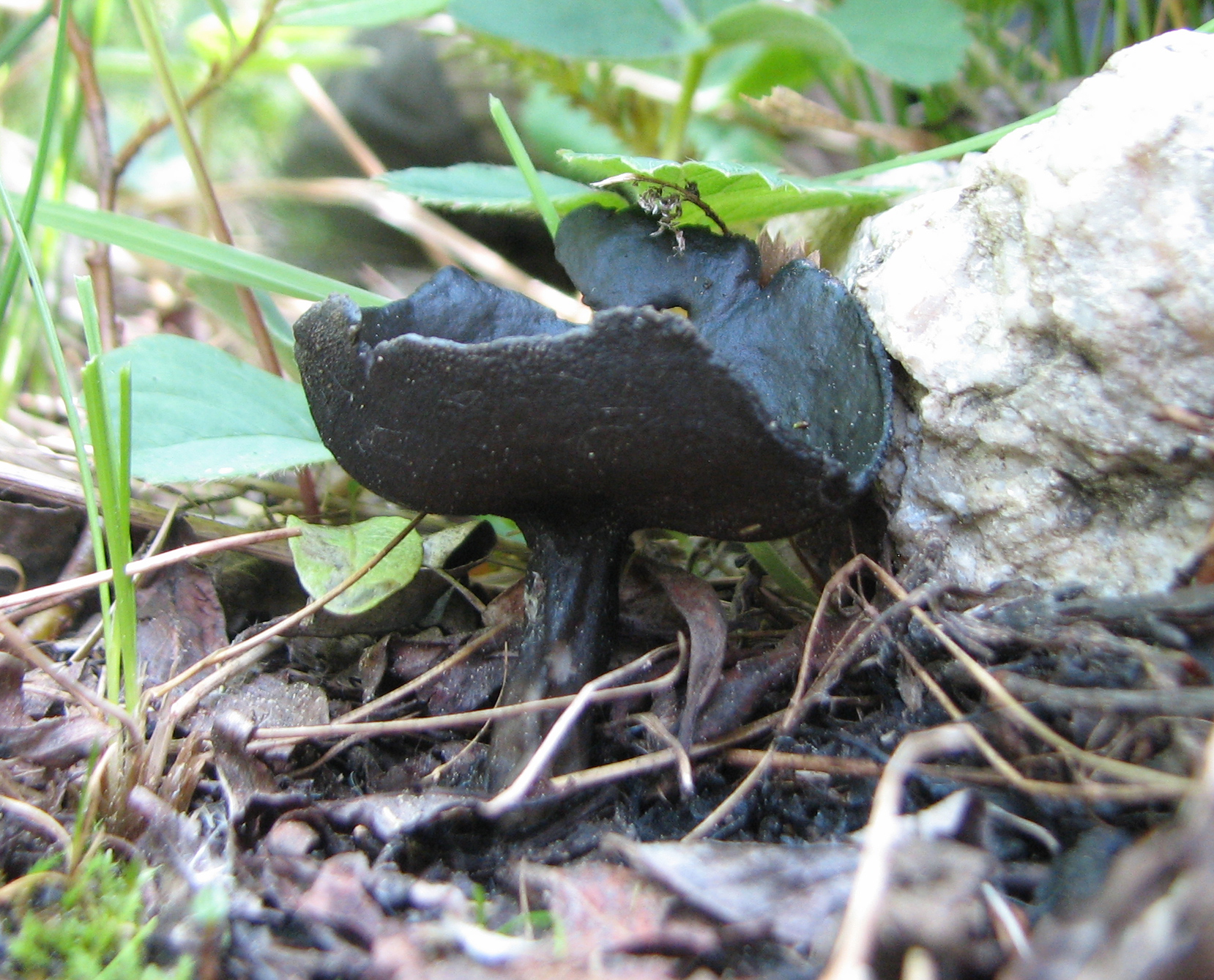
Pseudoplectania nigrella (left) and Helvella corium (right) are lookalike species.

Based on external appearance, Plectania nannfeldtii is similar to Pseudoplectania vogesiaca. Although this latter species may be difficult to distinguish by its less hairy external fruit body surface, its microscopic characters identify it more definitively: P. vogesiaca has spores that are much smaller, typically with widths of 12–14 μm. Helvella corium is another black cup fungus that appears in the spring; it has smaller spores, whitish margins on the cup edges, and shorter stems than P. nannfeldtii. P. melastoma and P. milleri have, at most, short stipes. Pseudoplectania nigrella is smaller, with a hairier outer surface, a darker inner cup surface, and a rudimentary stem.

== Habitat and distribution ==
Plectania nannfeldtii is typically found at higher elevations in coniferous forests growing on wet twigs or other rotting woody debris, often in or near snow. It often begins its development underneath the snow, reaching maturity as the snowbank recedes to expose it; one source suggests that its metabolic heat may help it melt a path through snow as it grows. It may grow singly, scattered or in clusters, and has been noted to have a preference for the wood of Picea engelmannii and Abies lasiocarpa as well as other conifers. In North America, it is found in the Western United States and Canada, where it fruits from late May to early August; it is common in the Sierra Nevada and in higher elevations of the Pacific Coast Ranges. Its distribution also includes China and Japan.

== See also ==
- Snowbank fungus
