= Selenaspora =

Scientific classification
- Kingdom: Fungi
- Division: Ascomycota
- Class: Pezizomycetes
- Order: Pezizales
- Family: Sarcosomataceae
- Genus: Selenaspora; R. Heim & Le Gal

Type species
- Selenaspora batava R. Heim & Le Gal

Genus of fungi

Selenaspora is a genus of fungi in the family Sarcosomataceae. The genus is monotypic, containing the single species Selenaspora batava, found in Europe and North America.
