= Strumella =

Strumella may refer to:

- Strumella (moth), a genus of moth in the family Lasiocampidae
- Strumella (fungus), a genus of fungi in the family Sarcosomataceae
