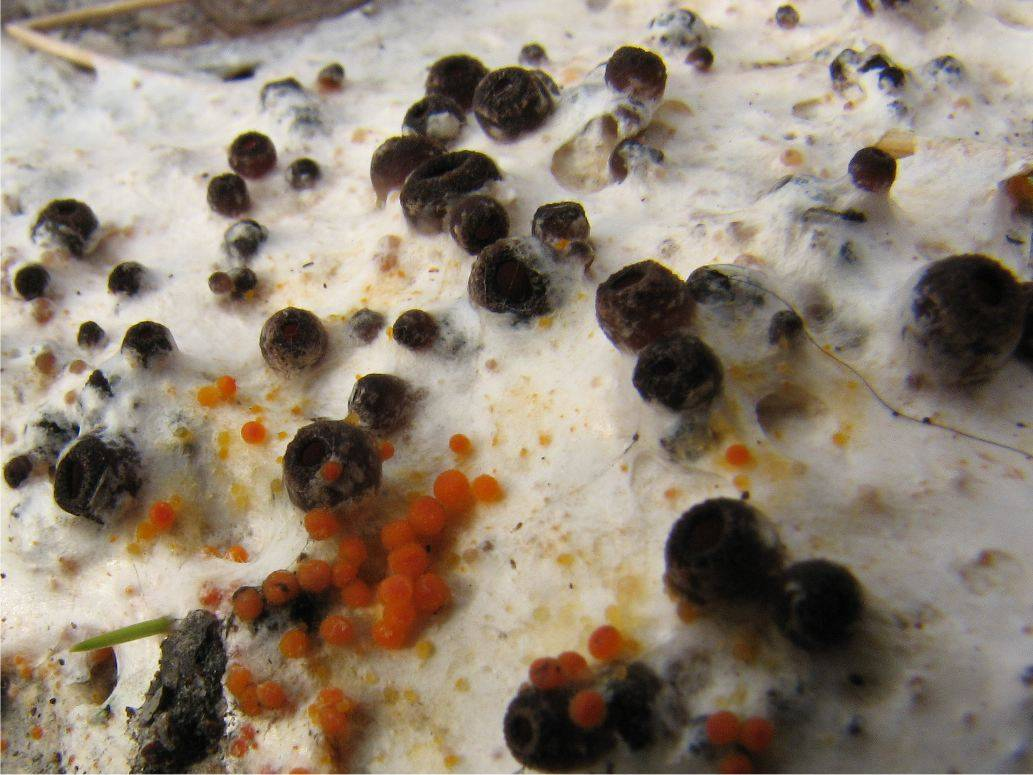
- Pseudombrophila aggregata

Scientific classification
- Kingdom: Fungi
- Division: Ascomycota
- Class: Pezizomycetes
- Order: Pezizales
- Family: Pseudombrophilaceae
- Genus: Pseudombrophila; Boud. (1885)

Type species
- Pseudombrophila pedrottii Boud. (1885)

Species
- 28 species

Synonyms
- Ramulina Velen. (1947); Nannfeldtiella Eckblad (1968); Svrcekomyces J.Moravec (1976); Pseudombrophila sect. Nannfeldtiella (Eckblad) Brumm. ex Y.J.Yao & Spooner (2006)

= Pseudombrophila =

Genus of fungi

Pseudombrophila is a genus of fungi in the family Pseudombrophilaceae. The widely distributed genus contains 28 species.

== Species ==
- Pseudombrophila aggregata
- Pseudombrophila cervaria
- Pseudombrophila deerrata
- Pseudombrophila equina
- Pseudombrophila hepatica
- Pseudombrophila leporum
- Pseudombrophila merdaria
- Pseudombrophila misturae
- Pseudombrophila pedrottii
- Pseudombrophila pluvialis
- Pseudombrophila porcina
- Pseudombrophila ramosa
- Pseudombrophila theioleuca
