= Strumella (fungus) =

Scientific classification
- Kingdom: Fungi
- Division: Ascomycota
- Class: Pezizomycetes
- Order: Pezizales
- Family: Sarcosomataceae
- Genus: Strumella; Fr.

Type species
- Strumella cucurbitacearum Fr.

Species
- Strumella cucurbitacearum Strumella griseola Strumella hysterioidea

Genus of fungi

Strumella is a genus of fungi in the family Sarcosomataceae. Species in this genus are anamorphic forms of the genus Urnula.
