= Plectasin =

Fungal protein

Plectasin is an antibiotic protein from the mushroom Pseudoplectania nigrella. It was initially discovered in 2005 and commercialised by Novozymes. Plectasin belongs to the antimicrobial peptide class called fungal defensins, which is also present in invertebrates such as flies and mussels.

== Clinical trials ==
Pre-clinical tests in mice have shown promising results in that multiresistant bacteria have problems mutating resistance against plectasin, which acts by directly binding the bacterial cell-wall precursor Lipid II in a supramolecular complex.

At the end of 2008, Novozymes signed a global licensing agreement with Sanofi-Aventis for the further development and marketing of NZ2114, a derivative of plectasin, as a treatment for gram-positive bacterial infections, e.g. Streptococcus and Staphylococcus which are resistant to all existing antibiotics.
