= Marcelleina =

Scientific classification
- Kingdom: Fungi
- Division: Ascomycota
- Class: Pezizomycetes
- Order: Pezizales
- Family: Pezizaceae
- Genus: Marcelleina; Brumm., Korf & Rifai (1967)

Type species
- Marcelleina persoonii (P.Crouan & H.Crouan) Brumm. (1967)

Species
- see text

Genus of fungi

Marcelleina is a genus of fungi within the Pezizaceae family. The genus was circumscribed in 1967.

The genus name of Marcelleina is in honour of Marcelle Louise Fernande Le Gal (1895-1979), who was a French mycologist and lichenologist.

== Species ==
According to a standard reference text, Marcelleina is widespread in distribution and contains nine species; two new species were since published in 2010 and 2011.

- Marcelleina atroviolacea
- Marcelleina benkertii
- Marcelleina brevicostatispora
- Marcelleina chopraiana
- Marcelleina donadinii
- Marcelleina georgii
- Marcelleina mediterranea
- Marcelleina parvispora
- Marcelleina persoonii
- Marcelleina pseudoanthracina
- Marcelleina rickii
- Marcelleina tuberculispora
