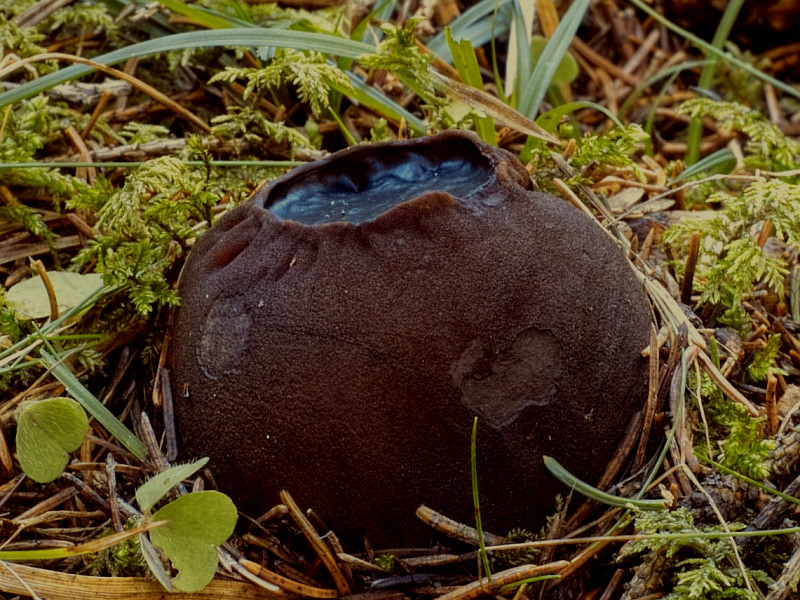
- Sarcosoma globosum

Conservation status
- Near Threatened (IUCN 3.1)

Scientific classification
- Kingdom: Fungi
- Division: Ascomycota
- Class: Pezizomycetes
- Order: Pezizales
- Family: Sarcosomataceae
- Genus: Sarcosoma
- Species: S. globosum

Binomial name
- Sarcosoma globosum (Schmidel) Casp. (1891)

Synonyms
- Burcardia globosa Schmidel (1793); Bulgaria globosa (Schmidel) Fr. (1822); Sarcosoma globosum var. platydiscus Casp. (1891); Sarcosoma platydiscus (Casp.) Sacc. (1892)

= Sarcosoma globosum =

Species of fungus

Sarcosoma globosum, or witches cauldron, is a species of fungus in the family Sarcosomataceae. It was first described in 1793 by Casimir Christoph Schmidel. Johann Xaver Robert Caspary transferred it to the genus Sarcosoma in 1891.

Also known as the charred-pancake cup, it is a near-threatened fungus native to Northern Europe. It is rarely found in some parts of northeastern North America, particularly in the Great Lakes region. To biologists' surprise, in 2021 it was found in Northern British Columbia.

The witches cauldron is an ascomycete or sac fungus, meaning that its microscopic structure utilizes the ascus, a spore-bearing cell, for sexual reproduction. It is a detritivore, and survives on decomposing plant matter, most commonly leaf litter. It is found in spruce forests and does not currently have any human uses.

== Description and range ==
Sarcosoma globosum is most commonly studied in Northern Europe, particularly Sweden. However, its population has been in decline for the past 50 years. The organism's preference of well-drained, nutrient-rich soil near rivers and streams within light spruce forests has caused the fungus to go extinct in several central European countries.

It is native to Canada, Czech Republic, Estonia, Finland, Latvia, Norway, Poland, Russia, Sweden, Ukraine, and the United States. It has been classified as extirpated in Germany, Lithuania, and Slovakia.

== Ecology ==
The witches cauldron is found along streams and brooks in Northern Europe, where it has been studied and observed most thoroughly in Estonia, Finland, and Sweden, while in Norway it has become nearly extinct. The fruit bodies of the Sarcosoma globosum are described as big, round, and barrel-like, 5–10 centimetres (2–4 in) in diameter. Dark brown and even blackish in color, the witches cauldron can be glossy and velvety with a gelatinous substance inside. Its fruit bodies flatten and wrinkle with time.

The striking appearance of the fungus has made it easy to spot for tourists, who later report their findings to museums and researchers.

== Conservation threats to habitat ==
Some of the habitats of this fungus have been destroyed due to human activity associated with urban sprawl, such as the building of roads and houses, or forestry. However, some anthropogenic habitat degradation has actually allowed the species to flourish. Dense forest is not suitable for the Sarcosoma globosum, and the introduction of grazing cattle into the agroforest actually allowed the fungus to flourish in the 1950s. The species seems to grow well in selective logging zones, but it is unable to persist in forests that have ever been clear-cut.

This ascomycete fungus is nationally red-listed or classified as rare in 12 countries and regions in Europe. The Swedish EPA developed a Species Action plan for Sarcosoma globosum from 2010 to 2014.
