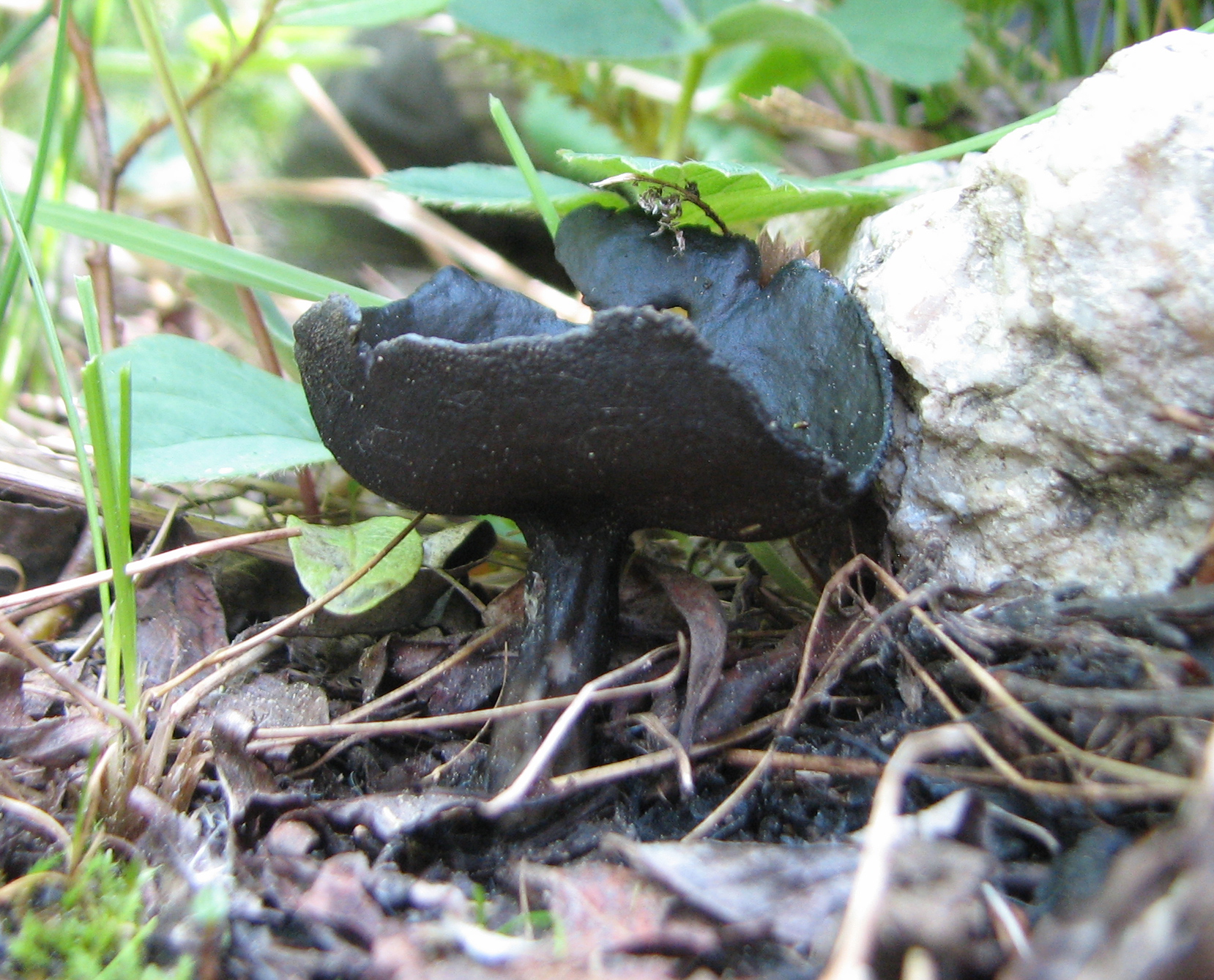

Scientific classification
- Domain: Eukaryota
- Kingdom: Fungi
- Division: Ascomycota
- Class: Pezizomycetes
- Order: Pezizales
- Family: Helvellaceae
- Genus: Helvella
- Species: H. corium

Binomial name
- Helvella corium (O.Weberb.) Massee (1895)

Synonyms
- Peziza corium O.Weberb. (1873); Scypharia corium (O.Weberb.) Quél. (1886); Cyathipodia corium (O.Weberd.) Boud. (1907); Helvella corium var. macrosperma (J.Favre) Bizio, Franchi & M.Marchetti (1998)

= Helvella corium =

Species of fungus

Helvella corium Mycological characteristics
- Smooth hymenium
- Cap is infundibuliform
- Hymenium attachment is not applicable
- Stipe is bare
- Ecology is mycorrhizal
- Edibility is unknown

Helvella corium is a species of fungus in the family Helvellaceae of the order Pezizales. This inedible cup-shaped fungus is black, and grows on the ground often near willows in deciduous or mixed forests.

== Description ==
The black fruit body (technically called an apothecium) is cup-shaped, covered with either scales or small silk-like surface fibrils (fibrillose), and up to 5 centimetres (2 inches) in diameter. The upper margin of the fruit body cup may be rounded with scalloped or lobed edges (crenate). The short, slender stipe (typically 0.6 to 1.8 cm (1/4 to 3/4 in) tall) is black on the upper part, but gray at the base; it is cylindrical and tapering (terete) with rounded ribs at its base. The odor and taste are not distinctive.

The spores are ellipsoid in shape, and measure 17–21 by 10–12 μm. They are hyaline (translucent), and contain a single central oil drop (guttulate). The spore-bearing cells, the asci, are 225–250 by 12–17 μm.

=== Similar species ===
Plectania nannfeldtii is a similar-looking fungus with a black-colored stalked cup, but this species has a longer stipe, up to 5 centimetres (2.0 in); microscopically, it has larger spores (typically 23–28 by 11–14 μm).

== Distribution and habitat ==
Helvella corium has been collected from Asia, Europe, and North America. It is uncommon despite the scope of its distribution. Fruit bodies grow solitary, scattered, or clustered in groups. It is often found in association with the trees Populus tremuloides or Thuja plicata, or with shrubs from genus Salix (such as Salix herbacea and Salix glauca), Shepherdia canadensis or shrubs from the genus Dryas. Jordan notes a preference for growing on sandy soils or in dunes.

This mushroom appears to have a high tolerance for otherwise inhospitable growing conditions, as it has been found growing on caustic spoil mounds (the end-product of many mining and manufacturing operations) of a alkali factory in Kraków, Poland, as well as on abandoned uranium tailings in Ontario, Canada.

== Potential toxicity ==
The edibility of the species is unknown, and its consumption is not recommended as similar species in the family Helvellaceae contain the toxin gyromitrin.
