= Korfiella =

Scientific classification
- Kingdom: Fungi
- Division: Ascomycota
- Class: Pezizomycetes
- Order: Pezizales
- Family: Sarcosomataceae
- Genus: Korfiella; D.C.Pant & V.P.Tewari (1970)

Type species
- Korfiella karnika D.C.Pant & V.P.Tewari (1970)

Genus of fungi

Korfiella is a fungal genus in the family Sarcosomataceae. A monotypic genus, it contains the single species Korfiella karnika, found in India and described as new to science in 1970.

== Discovery ==
The first scientifically documented collections of Korfiella karnika were made in November, 1965. Fruitbodies of the fungus were found growing on the rotting stump of a tree in Nainital, India. Specimens were sent to the Royal Botanic Gardens, Kew, where mycologist R.W.G. Dennis noted their similarity to Plectania melastoma. After further consultation with Discomycetes authority Richard P. Korf, the authors Pant and Tewari erected a new genus, naming it in honour of Korf. The specific epithet karnika—derived from the Sanskrit karna, ("ear")—refers to the fruitbody shape.

Pant and Tewari considered the fungus aligned with the tribe Urnuleae of the family Sarcoscyphaceae, according to the taxonomy of the time. Korfiella is now classified in the Sarcosomataceae. The phylogenetics of the family was examined using molecular techniques in a 2013 paper, but "Unfortunately, Korfiella has not been included due to the temporary absence of available samples."

== Description ==
The genus Korfiella has the following characteristics. Fruitbodies are leathery, with a split on one side that extends all the way to the base. They tend to grow in groups or scattered, attached to the substrate either directly, or, more rarely, by a short stipe-like base. The outer fruitbody surface is brown, while the surface of the hymenium is black. Microscopically, the excipulum (the tissue making up the walls of the apothecium) comprises two distinct layers. The medullary excipulum is made of textura intricata, containing brown hyphae running parallel to the outside. The ectal excipulum is dark chestnut-brown, with textura angularis tissue. Asci (spore-sproducing cells) do not turn blue when stained with iodine. They are long, with a cylindrical shape, and suboperculate. Spores produced by Korfiella karnika are hyaline (translucent), oval to elliptical, and contain one or two oil droplets.

In addition to having the general characteristics of the genus, Korfiella karnika is further defined by more specific measurements. The ear-shaped fruitbodies tend to be 12–30 mm (0.5–1.2 in) wide and 10–20 mm (0.4–0.8 in) tall. The hymenium measures 234–468 μm, including a subhymenium of 58–117 μm. The long, cylindrical asci measure 234–429 by 9.5–11 μm thick, and have narrow, flexuous, forked bases. Spores are 16–21 by 8–10.5 μm.

== Habitat and distribution ==
Korfiella is known only from its type collection in Ayar Pata, Nainital, India. It was found growing among mosses atop a rotting stump.
