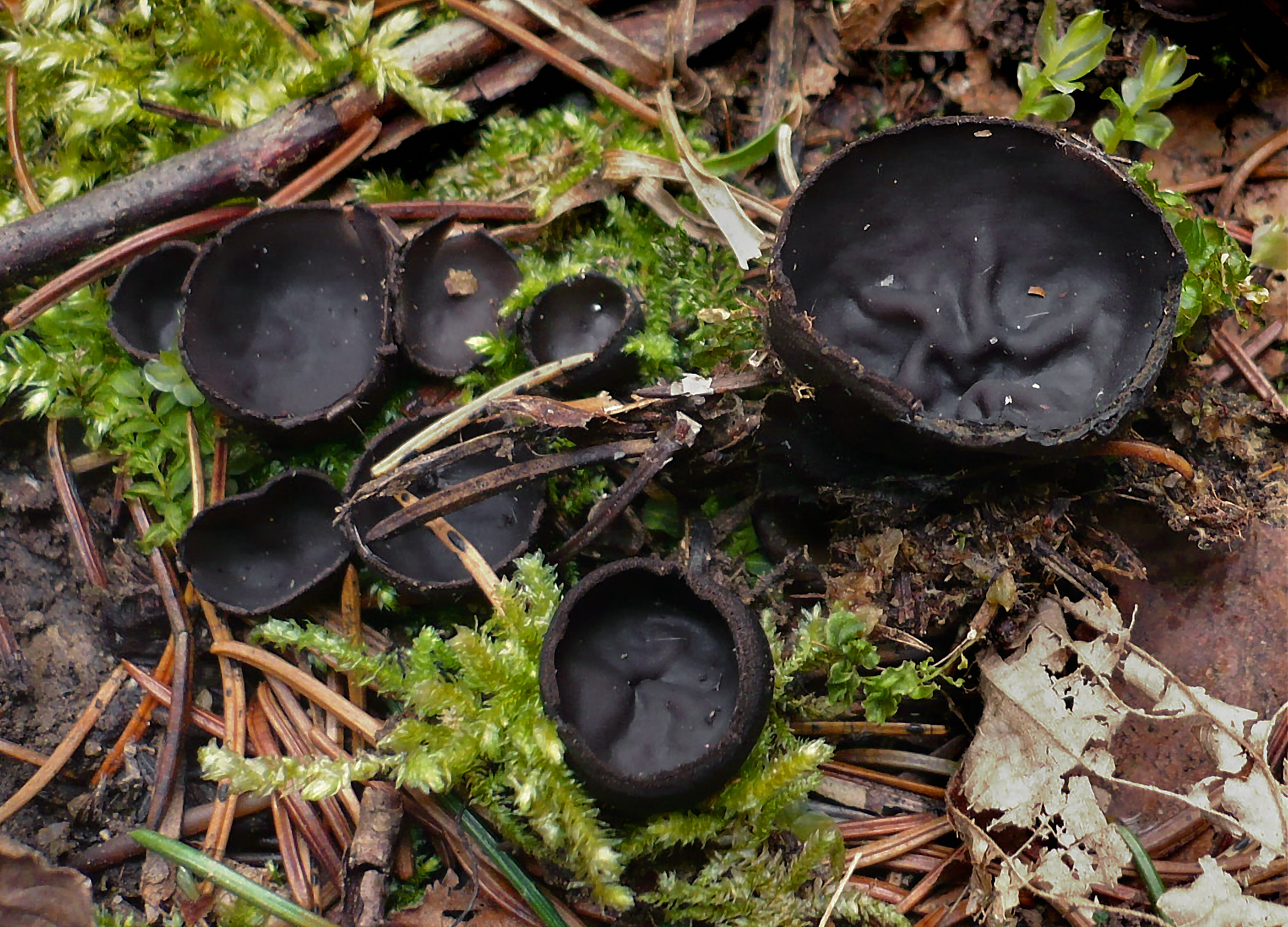

Scientific classification
- Domain: Eukaryota
- Kingdom: Fungi
- Division: Ascomycota
- Class: Pezizomycetes
- Order: Pezizales
- Family: Sarcosomataceae
- Genus: Pseudoplectania
- Species: P. nigrella

Binomial name
- Pseudoplectania nigrella (Pers.) Fuckel

Synonyms
- Crouania nigrella (Pers.) Hazsl. Peziza nigrella Pers. Plectania nigrella (Pers.) P. Karst.

= Pseudoplectania nigrella =

Species of fungus

Pseudoplectania nigrella, commonly known as the ebony cup, the black false plectania, or the hairy black cup, is a species of fungus in the family Sarcosomataceae. The fruit bodies of this saprobic fungus are small blackish cups, typically up to 2 cm (3/4 in) broad.

P. nigrella has a worldwide distribution, and has been found in North America, the Caribbean, Eurasia, Madagascar, and New Zealand. It grows in groups on soil or mossy rotting wood, often amongst pine needles. The fungus produces a unique chemical compound, plectasin, that has attracted research interest for its ability to inhibit the growth of the common human pathogenic bacterium Streptococcus pneumoniae.

== Taxonomy ==
Christian Hendrik Persoon named the species Peziza nigrella in his Systema Mycologia in 1801, and it was sanctioned under this name in Elias Magnus Fries' Systema Mycologicum in 1821. In 1870, German mycologist Fuckel transferred it to his newly described genus Pseudoplectania, and made it the type species. The species was ulteriorly placed in Crouania by Friedrich August Hazslinszky von Hazslin, and in Plectania by Petter Karsten (1885), but neither placement is considered correct.

The fungus is commonly known as the "ebony cup", the "black false plectania", or the "hairy black cup".

== Description ==
The fruit bodies (technically called apothecia) typically grow in groups, or sometimes crowded closely together, with small stems or missing them entirely. Initially, the fruit bodies are closed and roughly spherical, but as they develop they expand to become cup-shaped, or almost flat. The inner surface of the cups bear the reproductive spore-bearing layer, or hymenium; it is brownish-black, with an edge that is often wavy and curved slightly inwards, and covered with fine hairs. The cups may reach up to 2 cm (3/4 in) in diameter. The hairs are long but usually closely coiled and twisted, which gives the cap's exterior a slightly tomentose appearance of nearly uniform thickness. They are pale brown and 4–6 μm in diameter. The fungus has no distinctive taste or odor and is considered inedible.

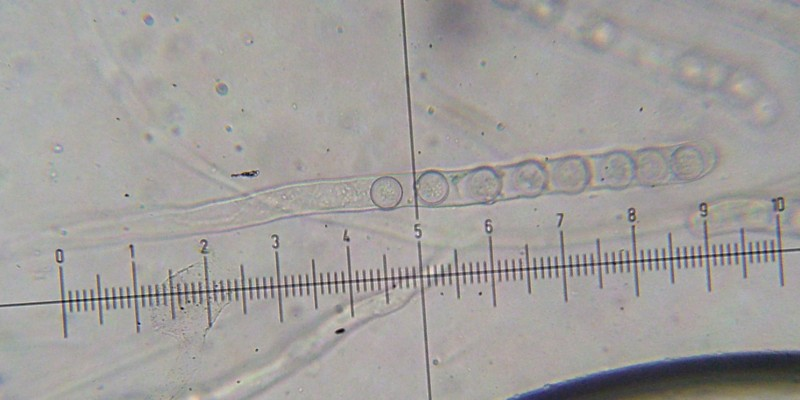
Ascus with spores

The asci are roughly cylindrical with a long stem-like base; the entire ascus is often as long as 300–325 μm and about 15 μm in diameter at the thickest point. The spores are round, smooth, translucent (hyaline), and have diameters of about 12–14 μm. They are filled with many small oil droplets. The paraphyses (sterile filamentous hyphae in the hymenium) are enlarged at their tips and filled with brown colored matter, about 4 μm thick.

=== Similar species ===
Pseudoplectania sphagnophila resembles P. nigrella, but has a more deeply and persistently cup-shaped fruit body, a short but distinct stem, and only grows amongst sphagnum moss. Plectania melastoma has elliptical to spindle-shaped spores measuring 20–28 by 8–12 μm, while Pseudoplectania milleri has elliptical spores, and the margin of its cups have star-shaped points.

Bulgaria inquinans may appear similar but the tops tend to flatten in maturity and the outsides may be lighter brown.

== Distribution and habitat ==
P. nigrella has a worldwide distribution, and has been found in North America, the Caribbean, Europe, India, Madagascar, New Zealand, Israel, and Japan.

This species is saprobic, and is found growing in groups on the ground or on moss-covered decaying wood, especially amongst fallen pine needles. In North America, fruit bodies appear in the spring and summer, and are fairly common; in Britain, the fungus fruits from winter to spring, and is rare. Its small size and dark color makes it easy to overlook.

== Research ==
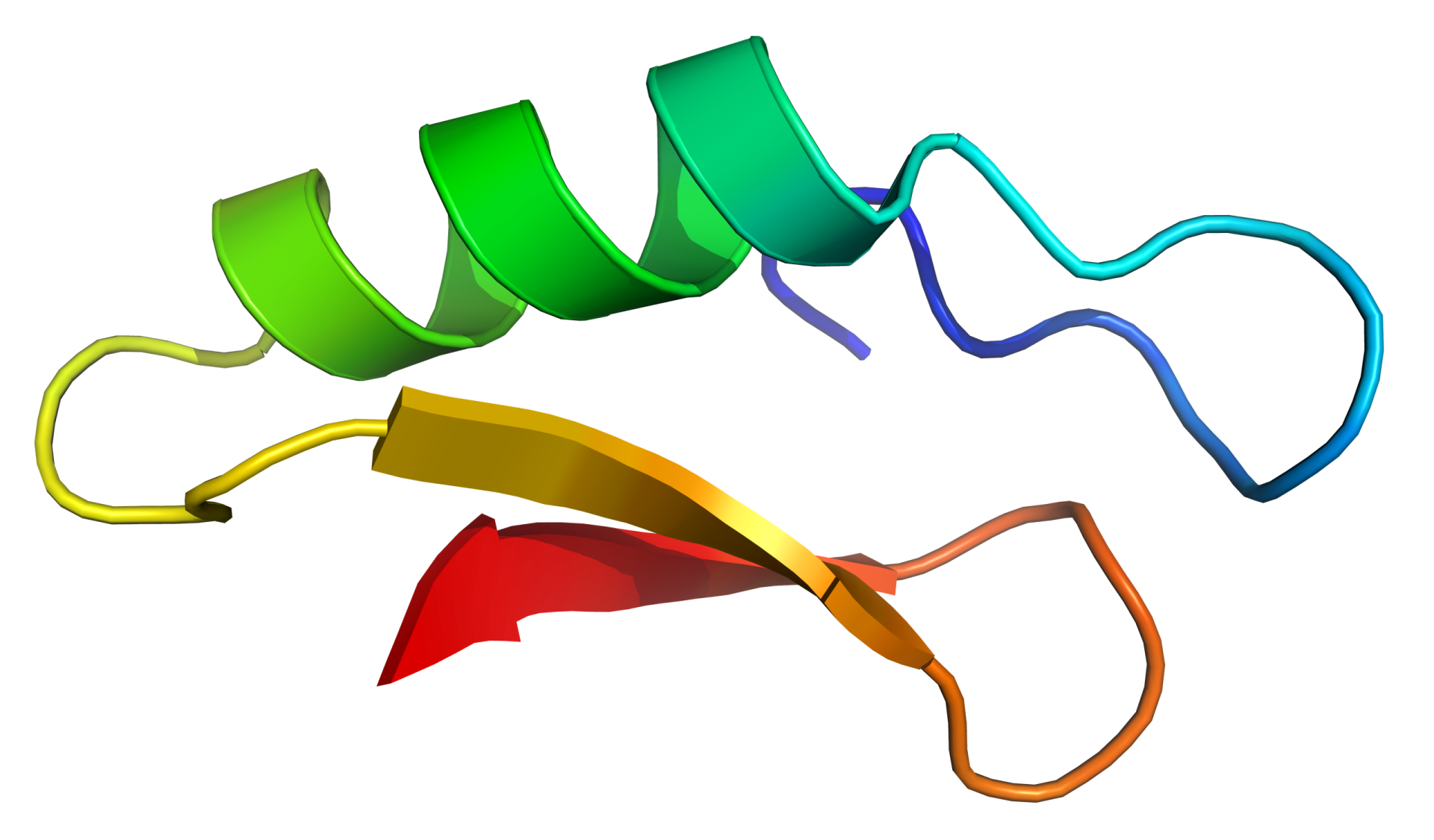
Ribbon diagram of plectasin. From PDB: 3E7R.

Defensins are antibiotics made from peptides and are typically found in animals and higher plants. Plectasin, found in P. nigrella, is the first defensin to be isolated from a fungus. Plectasin has a chemical structure resembling defensins found in spiders, scorpions, dragonflies and mussels. In general, defensins have commonalities in their molecular structure, such as cysteines in the peptide stabilized with disulfide bonds. In particular, defensins from P. nigrella, invertebrates, and plants and share a conformation that has been named the CSαβ motif. In laboratory tests, plectasin was especially active in inhibiting the growth of the common human pathogen Streptococcus pneumoniae, including strains resistant to conventional antibiotics. Plectasin has a low toxicity in mice, and cured them of peritonitis and pneumonia caused by S. pneumoniae as efficiently as vancomycin and penicillin, suggesting that it may have therapeutic potential. In 2010, Chinese scientists announced a method for high-level production of plectasin using transgenic E. coli.
