= Elsie Kupfer =

German-American botanist and mycologist

- Born: September 5, 1877; Bayreuth, Kingdom of Bavaria
- Died: May 15, 1974 (aged 96); New York, New York
- Education: Columbia University
- Scientific career
- Thesis: Studies in plant regeneration (1907)

Elsie Mabel Kupfer (September 5, 1877 - May 15, 1974) was a German American botanist and mycologist.

== Life ==
In 1899, Kupfer graduated with a Bachelor of Science degree in Biology and then in 1901 with a Master of Science, both from Columbia University. She worked as a teacher at Wadleigh High School for Girls in New York. In 1907, she received her doctorate from Columbia with a thesis entitled "Studies in Plant Regeneration." She was a member of the Torrey Botanical Club and the New York Biology Teachers' Association.

As a Ph.D. student under the mentorship of Lucien Marcus Underwood, Kupfer reviewed the 1896 findings of German mycologist Heinrich Rehm. She proposed that Rehm’s transfer of Urnula craterium to Geopyxis be reversed, and Fries’ original classification be restored. Additionally, she determined that the fungal specimen collected by Underwood in 1893 and which Charles Horton Peck called Urnula geaster, be placed in a new genus, which she named Chorioactis.

The standard author abbreviation Kupfer is used to indicate this person as the author when citing a botanical name.

== Publications ==
- Linville, Henry B.; Bedford, Edgar A.; Goddard, Martha F.; Kupfer, Elsie M.; Sage, Lillian B.; Gruenberg, Benj. C. (1909). "The Practical Use of Biology". School Science and Mathematics. 9 (2): 121–130. doi:10.1111/j.1949-8594.1909.tb01383.x. ISSN 1949-8594.
- Kupfer, Elsie M. (December 1903). "Anatomy and Physiology of Baccharis genistelloides". Bulletin of the Torrey Botanical Club. 30 (12): 685–696. doi:10.2307/2478586. ISSN 0040-9618. JSTOR 2478586.
