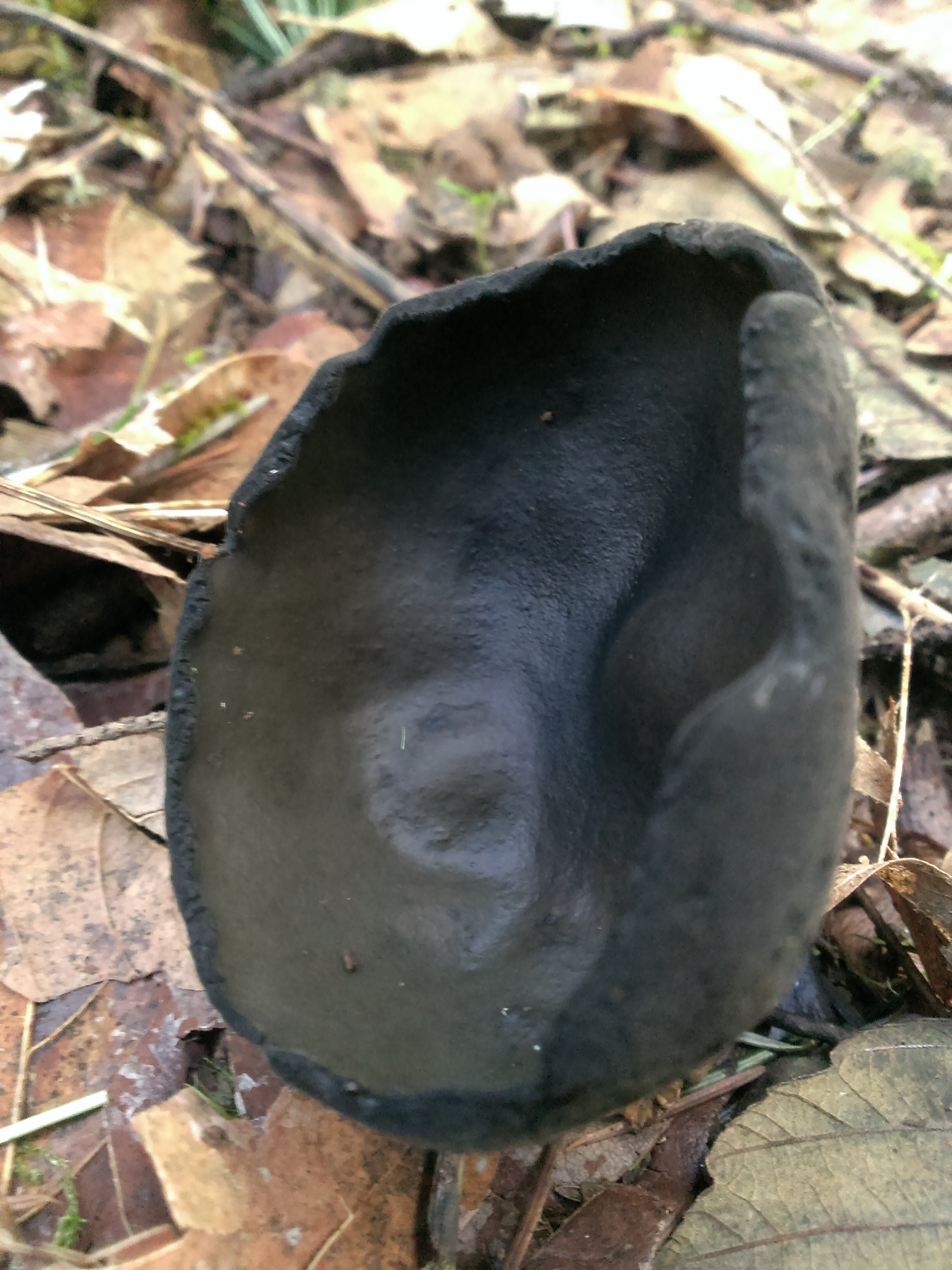

Scientific classification
- Domain: Eukaryota
- Kingdom: Fungi
- Division: Ascomycota
- Class: Pezizomycetes
- Order: Pezizales
- Family: Sarcosomataceae
- Genus: Urnula
- Species: U. padeniana

Binomial name
- Urnula padeniana M.Carbone, Agnello, A.D.Parker & P.Alvarado (2013)

= Urnula padeniana =

Species of fungus

Urnula padeniana is a species of cup fungus in the family Sarcosomataceae. It was described as new to science in 2013. It has a rubbery, black fruitbody up to 9 cm (3.5 in) in diameter and 7 cm (2.8 in) high, with gelatinous flesh. It spores typically measure 25–30 by 11–13 μm. The fungus is found in North America.
