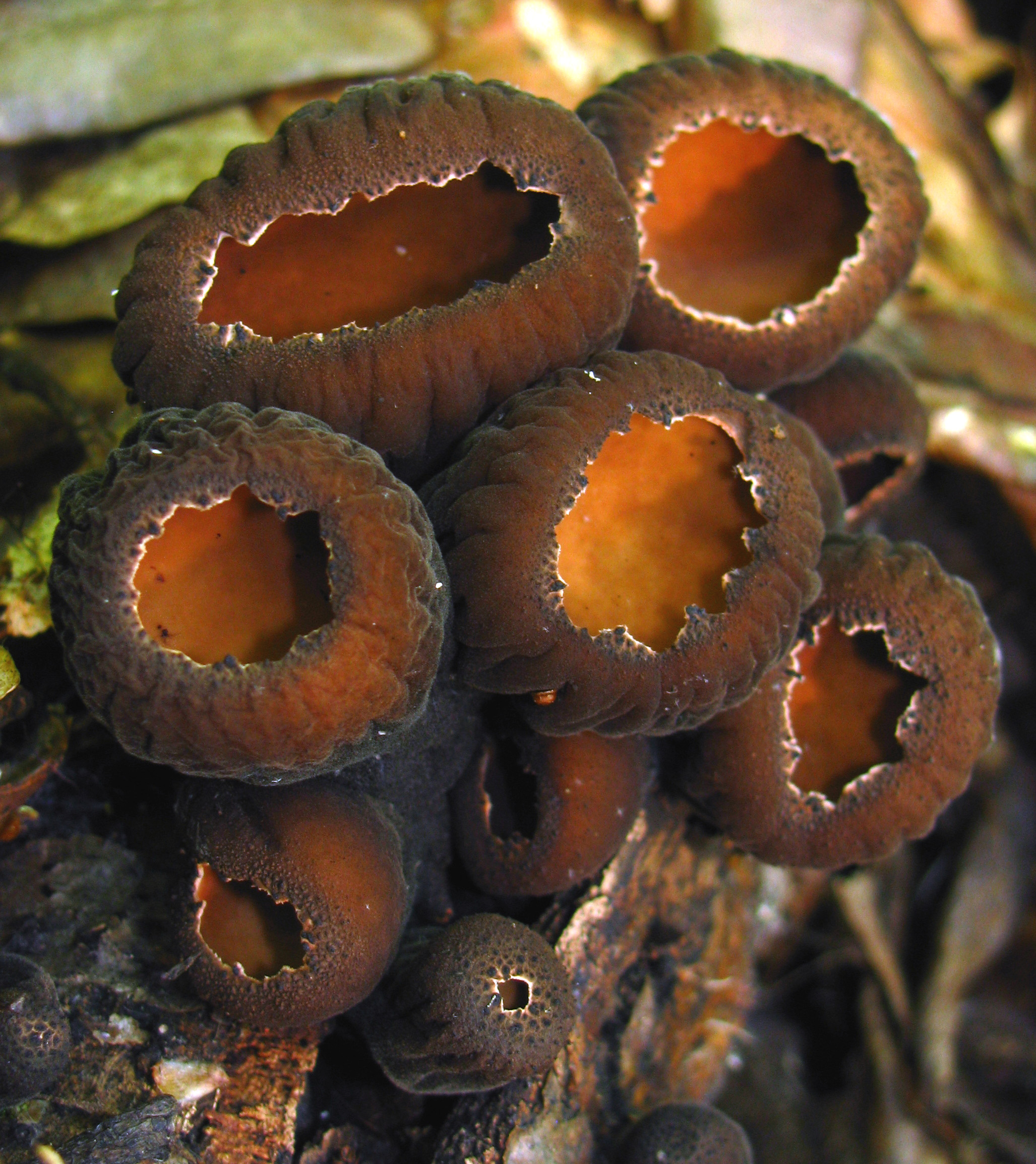
- Galiella rufa

Scientific classification
- Domain: Eukaryota
- Kingdom: Fungi
- Division: Ascomycota
- Class: Pezizomycetes
- Order: Pezizales
- Family: Sarcosomataceae
- Genus: Galiella; Nannf. & Korf (1957)

Type species
- Galiella rufa (Schwein.) Nannf. & Korf (1957)

= Galiella =

Genus of fungi

Galiella is a genus of fungi in the family Sarcosomataceae. The genus is widely distributed in northern temperate regions, and according to one estimate, contains eight species.

== Taxonomy ==
Galiella was described in 1957 by Richard P. Korf and John Axel Nannfeldt. In the early 1950s, French mycologist Marcelle Louise Fernande Le Gal used the generic name Sarcosoma to treat several species that she did not think belonged in the same genus as Sarcosoma globosum, the type species. As Korf later pointed out, this usage contravened the rules of botanical nomenclature. Korf and Nannfield proposed Galiella to accommodate these species, and set G. rufa as the type. The generic name honors French mycologist Marcelle Louise Fernande Le Gal.

== Description ==
Galiella includes bulgarioid species (those with a morphology similar to those in Bulgaria) with spores featuring surface warts that are made of callose-pectic substances that stain with methyl blue dye.

== Species ==
- Galiella amurensis
- Galiella coffeata
- Galiella japonica
- Galiella rufa
- Galiella sinensis
- Galiella spongiosa
- Galiella thwaitesii
