= Conoplea =

Scientific classification
- Kingdom: Fungi
- Division: Ascomycota
- Class: Pezizomycetes
- Order: Pezizales
- Family: Sarcosomataceae
- Genus: Conoplea; Pers.

Genus of fungi

Conoplea is a genus of fungi first described by Christian Hendrik Persoon in 1801. The eight members of the genus are anamorphic versions of Sarcosomataceae species.
