= John Axel Nannfeldt =

Swedish botanist and mycologist

- Born: 18 January 1904; Trelleborg
- Died: 4 November 1985 (aged 81); Uppsala
- Education: Uppsala University
- Scientific career
- Fields: mycology, botany
- Workplaces: Uppsala University
- Author abbrev. (botany): Nannf.

Signature
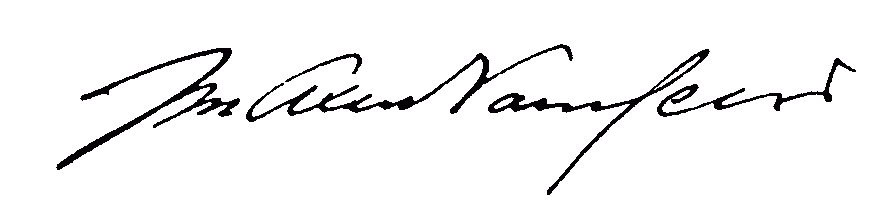

John-Axel Nannfeldt (baptized Johan Axel Frithiof Nannfeldt), born 18 January 1904 in Trelleborg and deceased 4 November 1985 in Uppsala, was a Swedish botanist and mycologist.

Nannfeldt studied natural history at the University of Uppsala and obtained a doctorate degree in 1932. He became professor of botany at Uppsala University in 1939, a position he held until his retirement in 1970. He did numerous studies on the systematics of fungi and vascular plants. Among the groups he treated were the plant pathogenic rust fungi, smut fungi and Exobasidium. He also treated taxonomy and biogeography of various groups of vascular plants, e.g. the arctic Poa laxa complex.

Nannfeldt published the exsiccata Fungi Exsiccati Suecici, praesertim Upsalienses together with Lennart Holm and others.

He was elected member no. 983 of the Royal Swedish Academy of Sciences in 1955.

The fungal genus Nannfeldtiella was named in his honour by Franz Petrak in 1947, (now listed as a synonym of Pseudombrophila aggregata (Eckblad) Harmaja.) then in 1960, mycologist Richard P. Korf circumscribed Jafnea, which is a genus of fungi in the family Pyronemataceae. The species of cup fungus, Plectania nannfeldtii was also named in 1968.

== See also ==
- Category:Taxa named by John Axel Nannfeldt
