= Nannfeldtiella =

Scientific classification
- Kingdom: Fungi
- Division: Ascomycota
- Class: Pezizomycetes
- Order: Pezizales
- Family: Pyronemataceae
- Genus: Nannfeldtiella; Eckblad (1968)

Type species
- Nannfeldtiella aggregata Eckblad (1968)

Genus of fungi

Nannfeldtiella is a genus of fungi in the family Pyronemataceae.

The genus name of Nannfeldtiella is in honour of Johan Axel Frithiof Nannfeldt (1904–1985), who was a Swedish botanist and mycologist.

The genus was circumscribed by Finn-Egil Eckblad in Nytt Mag. Bot. vol.15 on page 116 in 1968.

The GBIF list this as a synonym of Pseudombrophila aggregata (Eckblad) Harmaja.
