= Casimir Christoph Schmidel =

German naturalist

Casimir Christoph Schmidel (born 21 November 1718 in Bayreuth, Germany, died 18 December 1792 in Ansbach, Germany) was a naturalist of the 18th century who researched in botany and mineralogy.

Among genera he named are the flowering plant genera Penstemon and Proboscidea and the fern genus Thelypteris. Among species he described are the red alga Dilsea carnosa
