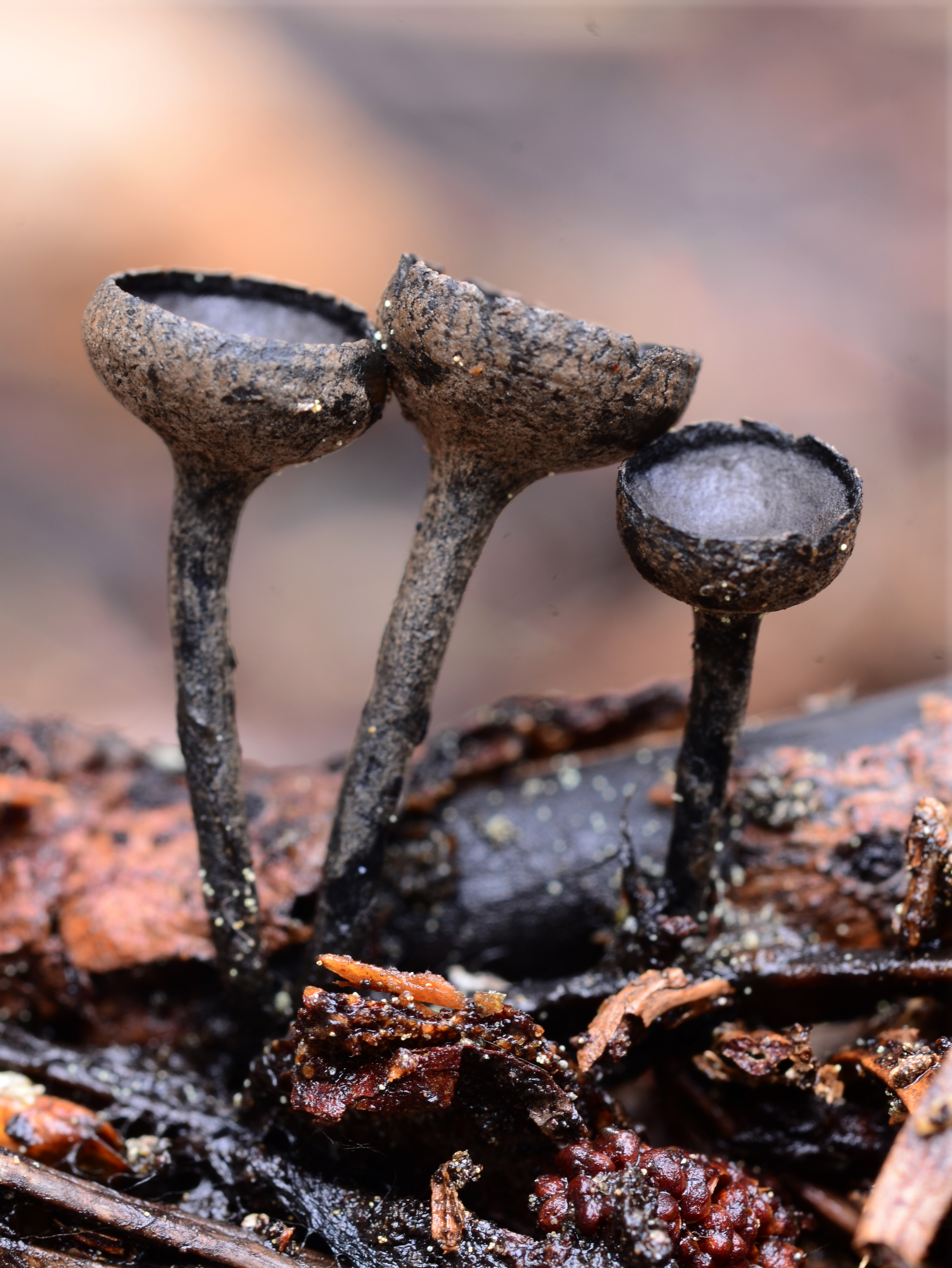
- Donadinia nigrella

Scientific classification
- Kingdom: Fungi
- Division: Ascomycota
- Class: Pezizomycetes
- Order: Pezizales
- Family: Sarcosomataceae
- Genus: Donadinia; Bellem. & Mel.-Howell (1990)

Type species
- Donadinia helvelloides (Donadini, Berthet & Astier) Bellem. & Mel.-Howell (1990)

Species
- D. seaveri; D. sibirica

= Donadinia =

Genus of fungi

Donadinia is a genus of fungi in the family Sarcosomataceae. It contains the species Donadinia sibirica from Russia, and Donadinia seaveri, found in Bermuda.
