= Marcelle Louise Fernande Le Gal =

French mycologist

- Born: February 14, 1895; Amiens, France
- Died: June 23, 1979; Amiens, France
- Education: University of Paris, Columbia University
- Scientific career
- Fields: Botany, mycology, biochemical taxonomy
- Workplaces: Muséum national d'Histoire naturelle

Marcelle Louise Fernande Le Gal (14 February 1895 – 23 June 1979) was a French mycologist and lichenologist, and a pioneer of taxonomy of the Pezizomycetes.

== Selected publications ==
- Le Gal, Marcelle (1953). "Les discomycètes de Madagascar". Prodrome Flore Mycol. Madagascar. 4 (1): 1–465.
- Le Gal, Marcelle (1941). "Les Aleuria et les Galactinia". Rev. Mycol. (Paris). 6: 56–82.
- Le Gal, Marcelle (1957). "Le genre Leucoscypha". Boud. Bull. Jard. Bot. 27: 719–728.
- Le Gal, Marcelle (1958). "Le genre Melastiza". Bull. Soc. Mycol. France. 74: 149–154.

== Awards ==
The fungal genera Marcelleina, Galiella, and Legaliana are named in her honor for her contributions to fungal taxonomy of the Pezizomycetes.
