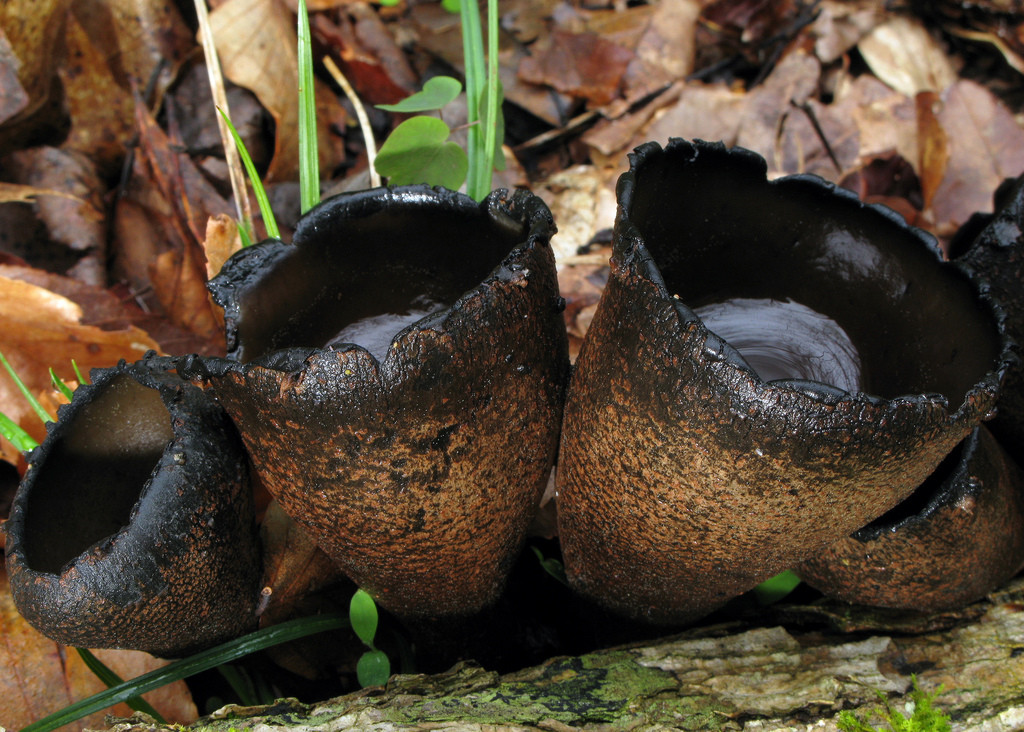
- The devil's urn, Urnula craterium

Scientific classification
- Kingdom: Fungi
- Division: Ascomycota
- Class: Pezizomycetes
- Order: Pezizales
- Family: Sarcosomataceae
- Genus: Urnula; Fr. (1849)

Type species
- Urnula craterium (Schwein.) Fr. (1851)

Species
- 10 species

= Urnula =

Genus of fungi

Urnula is a genus of cup fungi in the family Sarcosomataceae, circumscribed by Elias Magnus Fries in 1849. The genus contains several species found in Asia, Europe, Greenland, and North America. Sarcosomataceae fungi produce dark-colored (brown to black), shallow to deep funnel-shaped fruitbodies with or without a stipe, growing in spring. The type species of the genus is Urnula craterium, commonly known as the devil's urn or the gray urn. Urnula species can grow as saprobes or parasites having an anamorphic state. The anamorphic form of U. craterium causes Strumella canker, on oak trees.

== Taxonomy ==
Elias Magnus Fries circumscribed the new genus Urnula in 1849, and set what was then known as Peziza craterium as the type species. The genus name means "little urn"; the specific epithet is derived from the Latin cratera, referring to a type of bowl used in antiquity.

== Description ==
=== Imperfect states ===
The life cycle of Urnula craterium allows for both an imperfect (making asexual spores, or conidia) or perfect (making sexual spores) form; as has often happened in fungal taxonomy, the imperfect form was given a different name, because the relationship between the perfect and imperfect forms of the same species was not then known. The imperfect stage of Urnula craterium is the plant pathogenic species Conoplea globosa, known to cause a canker disease (Strumella canker) of oak and several other hardwoods.

== Species ==
- U. craterium (Schwein.) Fr. (1851)
- U. groenlandica Dissing (1981) – Greenland
- U. helvelloides Donadini, Berthet & Astier (1973)
- U. hiemalis Nannf. (1949) – Northern Europe; Alaska
- U. mediterranea (M.Carbone, Agnello & Baglivo) M.Carbone, Agnello & P.Alvarado (2013)
- U. mexicana
- U. padeniana M.Carbone, Agnello, A.D.Parker & P.Alvarado (2013)
- U. philippinarum Rehm (1914) – Philippines
- U. torrendii Boud. (1911) – Europe
- U. versiformis Y.Z.Wang & C.L.Huang (2014) – Taiwan
- U. viridirubescens (Bagnis) Boud. (1907)

The European species provisionally named Urnula brachysperma by François Brunelli in 1997 is not yet validly published.

Several species once classified in Urnula have since been transferred to other genera in the Sarcosomataceae or the Chorioactidaceae. Peck's 1894 Urnula geaster is now type species of the genus Chorioactis, while Urnula pouchetii Berthet & Riousset 1965 is now in Neournula (Chorioactidaceae). Urnula lusitanica, published in 1911 by Torrend and Boudier, is now Donadinia lusitanica. Urnula megalocrater Malençon & Le Gal 1958, Urnula platensis Speg. 1898, and Urnula rugosa Le Gal 1958 are now all classified in the genus Plectania.

== Habitat and distribution ==
Urnula species can grow as saprobes or parasites having an anamorphic state. Fruitbodies of U. craterium and U. hiemalis tend to persist in one location for many growing seasons, sometimes even for several decades.
