= Robert Caspary =

German botanist

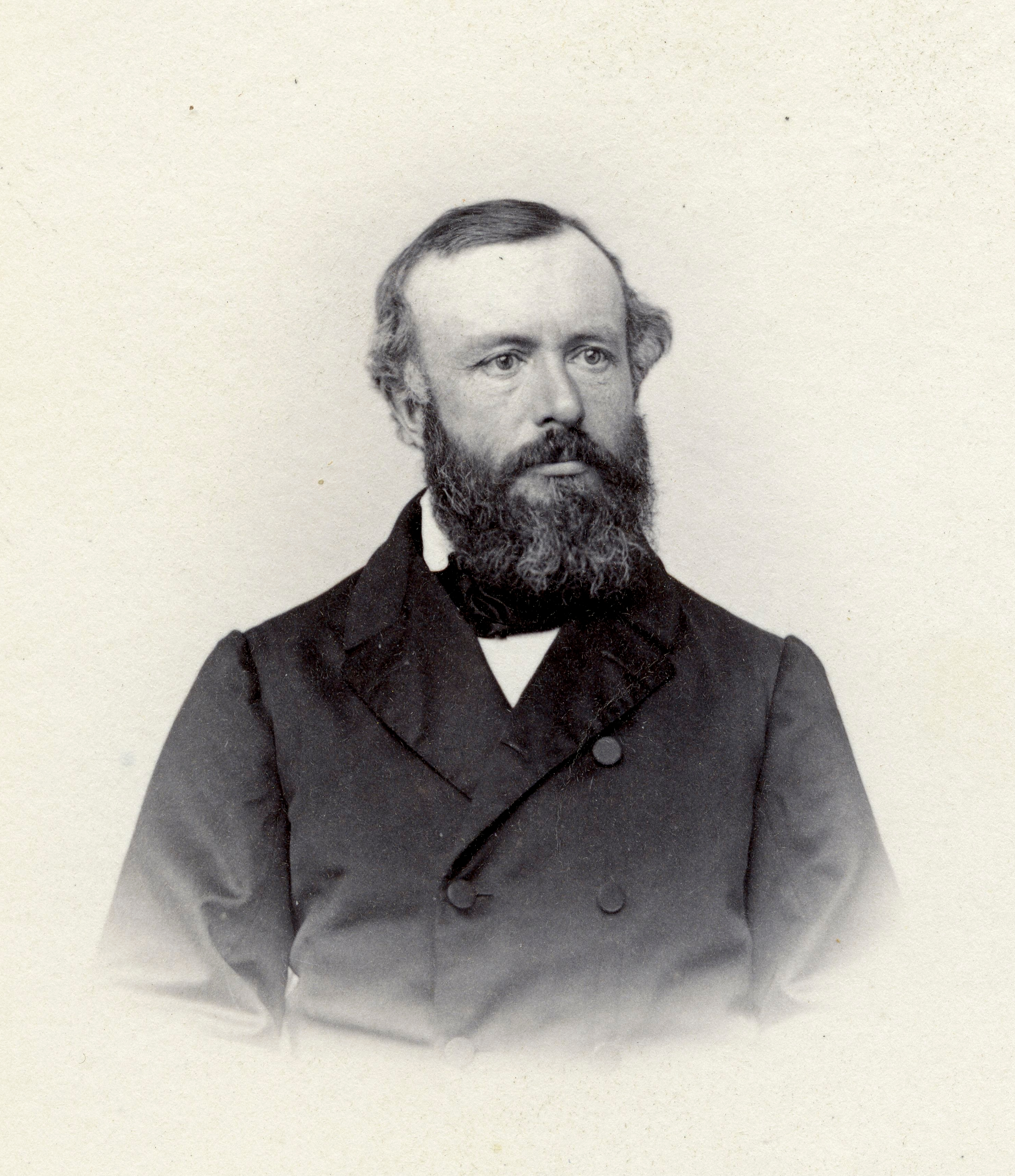
Robert Caspary

Johann Xaver Robert Caspary (29 January 1818 – 18 September 1887) was a German botanist.

Caspary was born in Königsberg. He studied theology and philosophy at the University of Königsberg and was educated in sciences at the University of Bonn. Among his influences at Bonn were zoologist Georg August Goldfuss, astronomer Friedrich Wilhelm August Argelander and botanist Ludolph Christian Treviranus. Afterwards, he spent considerable time in England studying marine and freshwater algae. From 1851 he served as a lecturer at the University of Berlin, where he worked closely with Alexander Braun. In 1859 he returned to Königsberg as a professor of botany and director of the botanical garden.

He specialized in the study of aquatic plants, including extensive systematic research involving the family Nymphaeaceae (water lilies). He made significant contributions in the fields of plant anatomy and morphology, being especially interested in growth of the trees and the structure of vascular tissue in plants. His name is associated with the "Casparian strip", defined as a secondary thickening in many endodermal cells in the form of a continuous band or strip on the radial and transverse walls.

== Selected works ==
- De nectariis ..., 1848.
- Alexander Braun's Leben, 1877 - Biography of Alexander Braun.
- Die Flora des Bernsteins und anderer fossiler Harze des ostpreussischen Tertiärs/ 1, 1. Thallophyta. 2. Bryophyta. 3. Pteridophyta. 4. Gymnospermae. (Part of the series, Preußische Geologische Landesanstalt; Abhandlungen der Preußischen Geologischen Landesanstalt) - Flora found in amber and other fossilized resin of the "East Prussian Tertiary" 1. Thallophyta. 2. Bryophyta. 3. Pteridophyta. 4. Gymnospermae.
