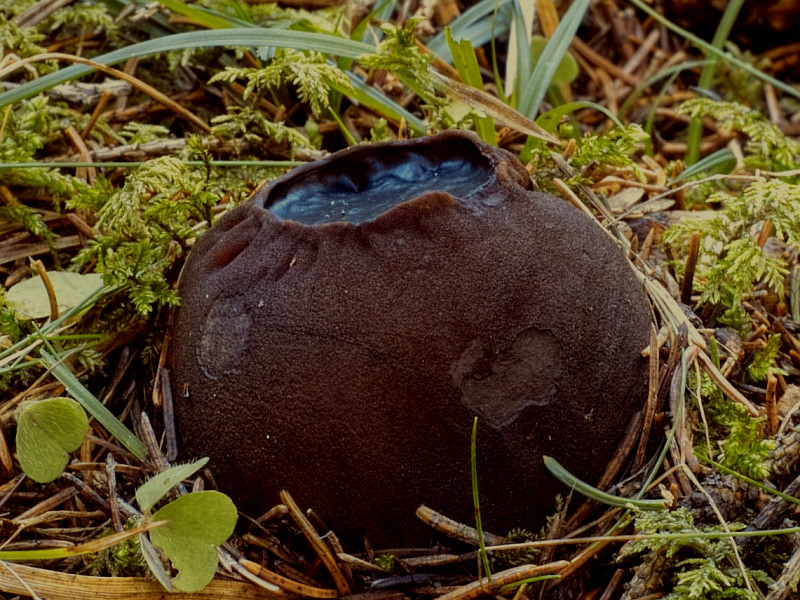
- Sarcosoma globosum

Scientific classification
- Kingdom: Fungi
- Division: Ascomycota
- Class: Pezizomycetes
- Order: Pezizales
- Family: Sarcosomataceae; Kobayasi (1937)

Type genus
- Sarcosoma Casp. (1981)

Genera
- Conoplea; Donadinia; Galiella; Korfiella; Plectania; Pseudoplectania; Sarcosoma; Selenaspora; Strobiloscypha; Strumella; Urnula

= Sarcosomataceae =

Family of fungi

The Sarcosomataceae are a family of fungi in the order Pezizales. According to a 2008 estimate, the family contains 10 genera and 57 species. Most species are found in temperate areas, and are typically saprobic on rotten or buried wood.
