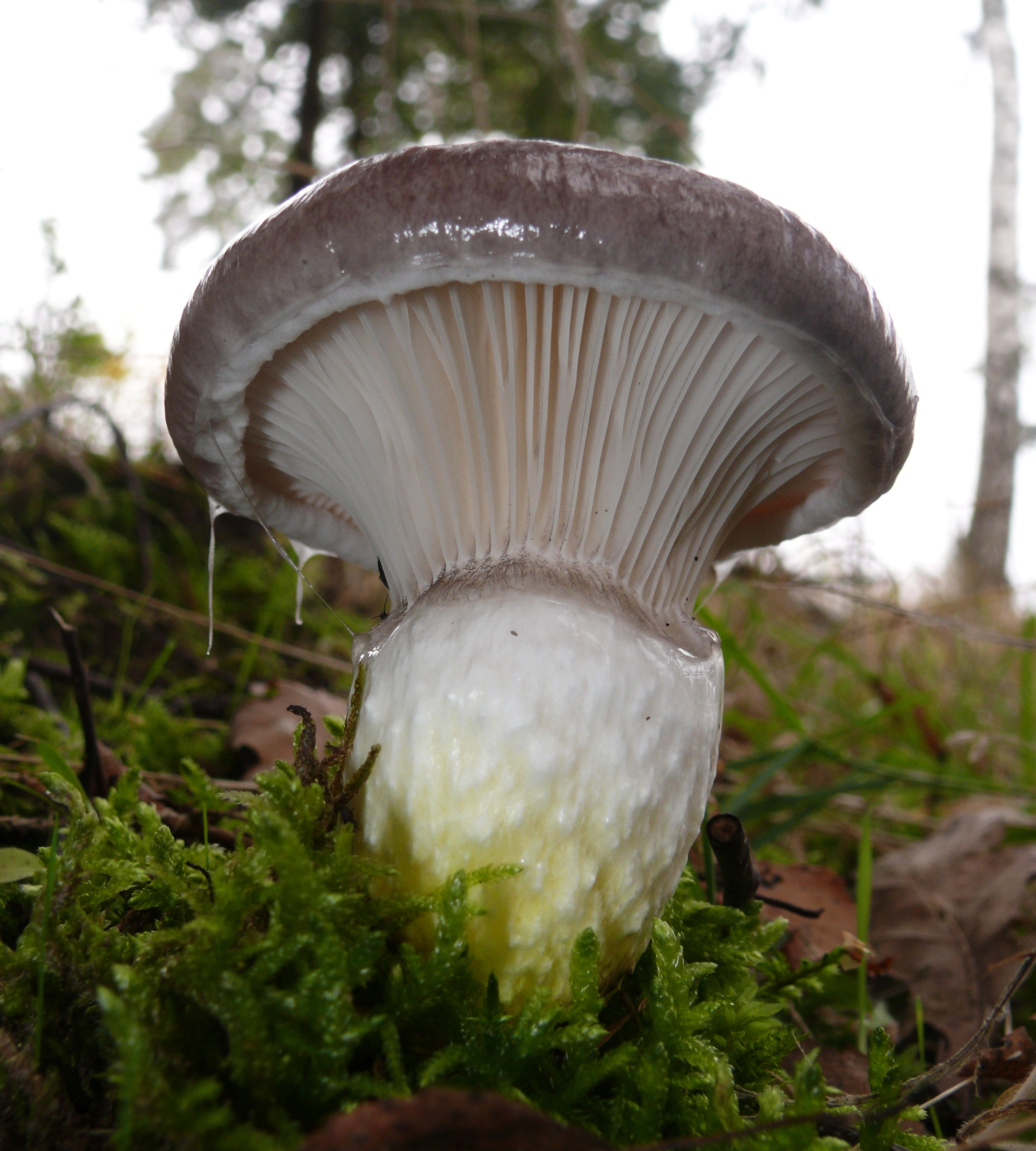

Scientific classification
- Kingdom: Fungi
- Division: Basidiomycota
- Class: Agaricomycetes
- Order: Boletales
- Family: Gomphidiaceae
- Genus: Gomphidius
- Species: G. glutinosus

Binomial name
- Gomphidius glutinosus (Schaeff.) Fr.

Synonyms
- Agaricus mucosus Bull., 1812; Cortinaria viscida Gray, 1821

= Gomphidius glutinosus =

Gomphidius glutinosus
- Mycological characteristics
- Gills on hymenium
- Cap is flat or convex
- Hymenium is decurrent
- Stipe has a ring
- Spore print is blackish-brown
- Ecology is mycorrhizal or parasitic
- Edibility is edible but not recommended

Picked mushrooms in a basket

Gomphidius glutinosus, commonly known as glutinous gomphidius, purple slime spike, slimy spike, slimy spike-cap, or hideous gomphidius, is a species of gilled mushroom. Although it has gills, it is a member of the order Boletales, along with the boletes. Initially, it is completely covered with a slimy veil, breaking through to reveal a greyish or brownish-capped mushroom with decurrent greyish gills which sometimes resembles a child's top.

The species is found in Europe and North America. It sprouts in pine, fir and spruce woodland in autumn. Opinions differ on the suitability of this mushroom for the table, with some holding it in high regard and others viewing it with caution.

== Taxonomy ==
Gomphidius glutinosus was initially described by German mycologist Jacob Christian Schäffer as Agaricus glutinosus in 1774, in his series on fungi of Bavaria and the Palatinate, Fungorum qui in Bavaria et Palatinatu circa Ratisbonam nascuntur icones. The father of mycology Elias Magnus Fries gave it its current genus and binomial name in 1838. The genus name is derived from the Greek 'γομφος' gomphos meaning "plug" or "large wedge-shaped nail". The specific epithet glutinosus is the Latin adjective "sticky".

British botanist Samuel Frederick Gray described Cortinaria viscida the "viscid curtain-stool" in his 1821 work A natural arrangement of British plants, concluded by Orson K. Miller Jr. to be the same species.

In 1971, Miller described two varieties: G. glutinosus var. purpureus from a specimen collected near Nordman, Idaho. More drab purple to wine-coloured, this taxon is native th the Rockies in Idaho, Montana and Alberta. G. glutinosus var. salmoneus was described from Kaniksu National Forest in Idaho. With a salmon-coloured cap, it is native to northern and central Idaho as far south as Payette National Forest.

Alternate common names in Germany are Kuhmaul "cow snout", and Rotzer.

== Description ==
Said to resemble a child's top, the mushroom has a dull dark purple, dark brownish or greyish cap ranging from 3–12 cm (1 1/8–4 3/4 in) in diameter; it has a central boss and an inrolled margin, and is initially convex and later flattens and may develop blackish markings. The cap surface is smooth and sticky. As with other members of the genus, the whole mushroom is often covered with slimy or sticky veil when young. The fungus tears free of the veil as it grows, leaving some strands and an indistinct ring.

The white stipe is 4–10 cm tall and 0.7–2 cm wide, and narrows toward the base, which is yellow. The yellow segment stains dark green to black with Melzer's reagent. The whitish flesh may have a wine-coloured tinge and has little taste or smell. The widely spaced decurrent gills are waxy in texture, with a hairy surface from the cystidia. Sometimes branched, they are initially whitish, then grey and later blackening with spores. The spore print is brownish-black. The large spores are spindle-shaped and measure 17–20 μm long by 5.5–6 μm wide.

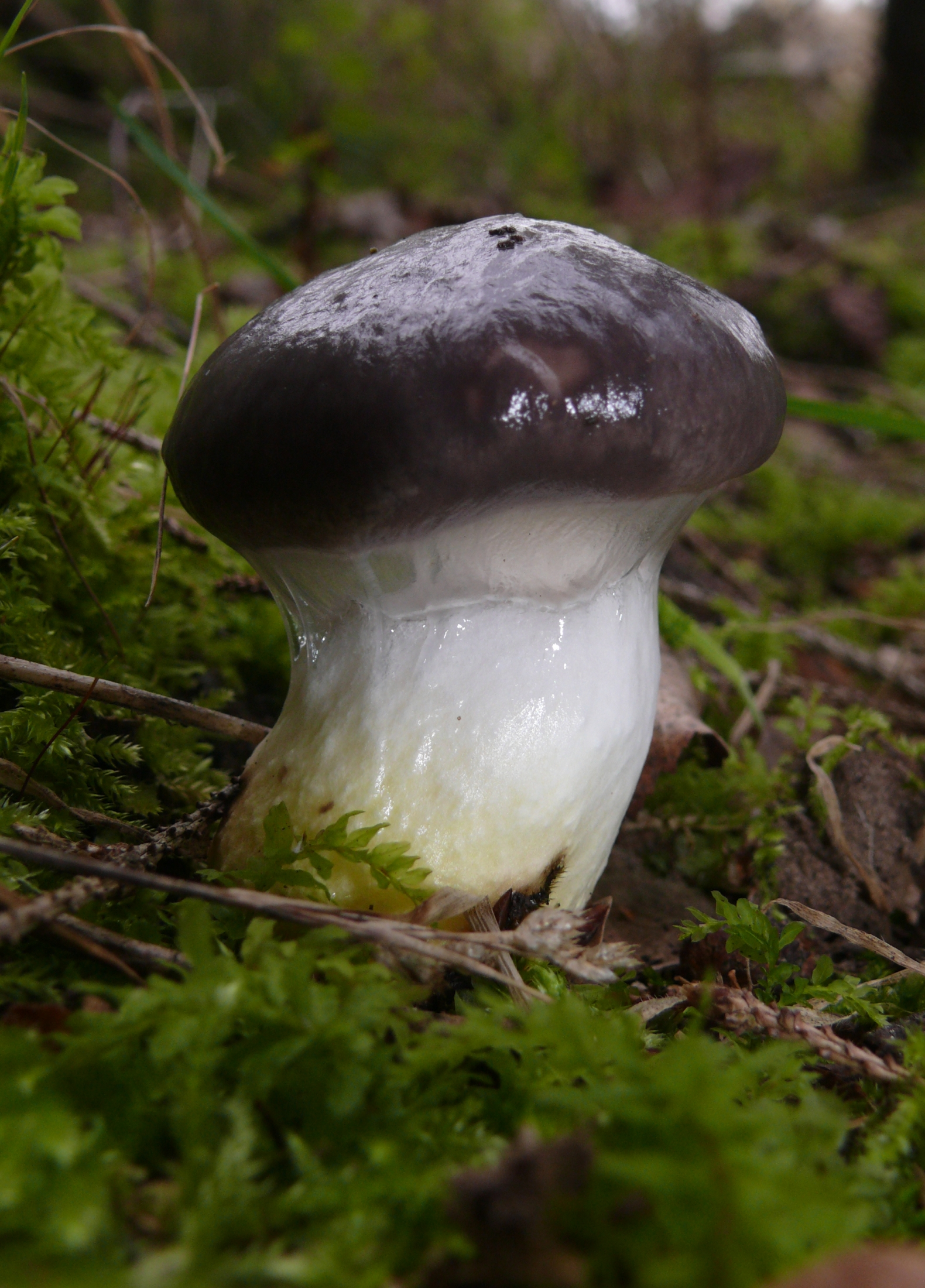
Young mushroom

A small cluster

Group of mushrooms of various ages

Very old mushrooms

=== Similar species ===
Brownish specimens may be mistaken at a glance for Suillus luteus, but a look under the cap will see there are gills rather than pores. Another similar-looking species is Hygrophorus hypothejus, found in similar habitat though with yellow gills which do not separate from the cap. The North American species Gomphidius smithii is similar but has a pale purple to wine-coloured cap.

Other similar species include Gomphidius oregonensis and Gomphidius subroseus.

== Distribution and habitat ==
Gomphidius glutinosus is found in Eurasia and North America up to elevations of 2,900 metres (9,600 ft), and is generally abundant across its range. It occurs in autumn under various species of conifer—both in natural woods and plantations—such as balsam fir (Abies balsamea), Norway spruce (Picea abies) and grand fir (Abies grandis). The mushrooms may be single, scattered, or occasionally growing in clumps. Fruiting bodies sprout in the autumn, to as late as December in northern California.

== Ecology ==
Like other members of the family Gomphidiaceae, Gomphidius glutinosus has been thought to be ectomycorrhizal, forming symbiotic relationship with their host trees. However, there is now evidence that many (and perhaps all) species in this group are parasitic upon ectomycorrhizal boletes, in relationships that are often highly species-specific, such as Gomphidius roseus upon Suillus bovinus.

Two specimens of Gomphidius glutinosus were found in Brechfa Forest on July 25, 2009. The only boletus to be found in the vicinity was Suillus grevillei.

G. glutinosus is a hyper-accumulating fungus that absorbs and concentrates elements such as cesium more than 10,000-fold over background levels. This property can be used to decontaminate sites contaminated with radioactive cesium-137.

== Edibility ==
Opinions differ on the suitability of this mushroom for the table; some guides hold it in high regard, while others view it with caution. Gomphidius glutinosus has a mild flavour well-suited for cooking with other mushrooms, and in soups and stews. It is not suited for drying. Removing the slime and skin of the cap is recommended as soon as possible after picking. Maggots only rarely attack this species. It, however, accumulates heavy metals.
