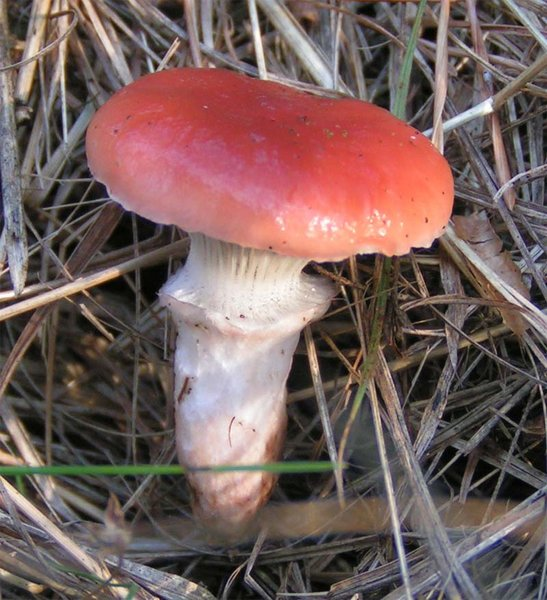

Conservation status
- Least Concern (IUCN 3.1)

Scientific classification
- Kingdom: Fungi
- Division: Basidiomycota
- Class: Agaricomycetes
- Order: Boletales
- Family: Gomphidiaceae
- Genus: Gomphidius
- Species: G. roseus

Binomial name
- Gomphidius roseus (Fr.) Oudem. (1867)

= Gomphidius roseus =

Species of fungus

Gomphidius roseus Mycological characteristics
- Gills on hymenium
- Cap is flat or convex
- Hymenium is decurrent
- Stipe has a ring
- Spore print is blackish-brown
- Ecology is parasitic
- Edibility is edible

Gomphidius roseus, commonly known as the rosy spike-cap or pink gomphidius, is a gilled mushroom found in Europe. Although it has gills, it is a member of the order Boletales, along with the boletes. It is a coral pink-capped mushroom which appears in pine forests in autumn, always near the related mushroom Suillus bovinus, on which it appears to be parasitic.

== Taxonomy ==
Gomphidius roseus was initially described by Swedish mycologist Elias Magnus Fries as Agaricus glutinosus β roseus in 1821, before he elevated it to species status and gave its current genus and binomial name in 1838. The genus name is derived from the Greek 'γομφος' gomphos meaning "plug" or "large wedge-shaped nail". The specific epithet roseus is the Latin adjective "pink".

== Description ==
The mushroom has a coral-pink cap up to 5 cm (2 in) in diameter, though sometimes larger, which is initially convex and later flattens and becomes a more brick-like colour with maturity. Often slimy or sticky as with other members of the genus, its cap lacks the blackish markings of the related G. glutinosus. The stipe is 2.5–4.5 cm (0.98–1.77 in) high and 0.4–1 cm wide and bears an indistinct ring. It is white with a pinkish or wine-coloured tint and often flushed yellow at the base. The whitish flesh may also be tinged pink and has little taste or smell. The decurrent gills are grey, and the spore print is brownish-black.

== Distribution and habitat ==
An uncommon fungus, Gomphidius roseus is found in Europe, but not in North America. A similar pinkish species, G. subroseus occurs in North America. G. roseus is found in Ukraine. It is found in pine woods, particularly Pinus sylvestris, associated with Suillus bovinus, and is often hidden in undergrowth. Fruiting bodies sprout in the autumn.

== Ecology ==
Like other members of the family Gomphidiaceae, Gomphidius roseus has been thought to be ectomycorrhizal, forming symbiotic relationship with their host trees. However, it is found exclusively with the related Jersey cow mushroom (Suillus bovinus), and is now thought to be parasitic upon its mycelium. This is evidenced by microscopic examination, which shows that G. roseus inserts haustoria in plant root cells and does not produce significant mycelium itself. Furthermore, G. roseus is never found growing in isolation, only with S. bovinus though the latter species is found without the former.

== Edibility ==
Gomphidius roseus is not known to be toxic but is reported to be of poor quality and hence not recommended for picking.
