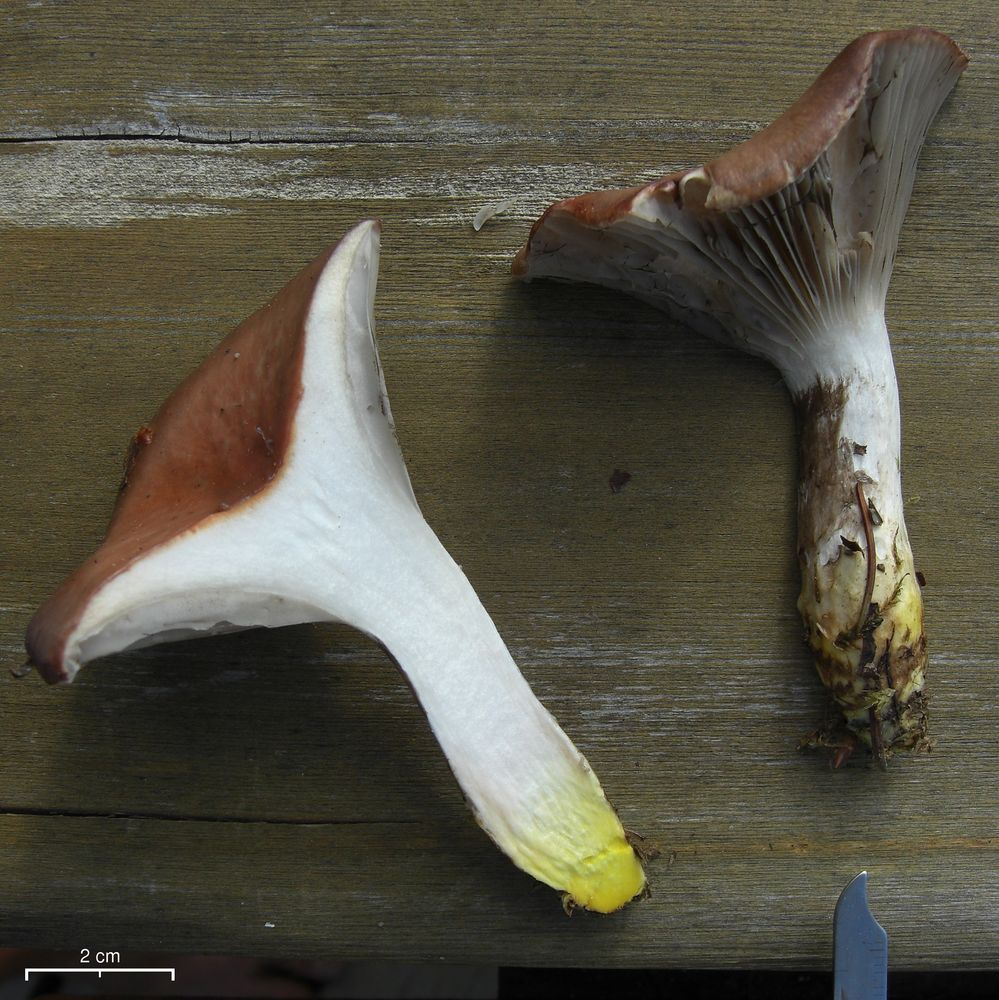

Scientific classification
- Kingdom: Fungi
- Division: Basidiomycota
- Class: Agaricomycetes
- Order: Boletales
- Family: Gomphidiaceae
- Genus: Gomphidius
- Species: G. oregonensis

Binomial name
- Gomphidius oregonensis Peck (1897)

= Gomphidius oregonensis =

Species of fungus

Gomphidius oregonensis Mycological characteristics
- Gills on hymenium
- Cap is convex or depressed
- Hymenium is decurrent
- Stipe is bare
- Spore print is black
- Ecology is parasitic
- Edibility is edible but not recommended

Gomphidius oregonensis, commonly known as insidious gomphidius or blackening slime spike, is a species of fungus. With age, the fruiting body becomes murky and "insidious" in appearance, hence its common name. G. oregonensis can be distinguished by its spores which are the shortest in its genus, typically less than 14 μm long. Earlier in its growth, it can be difficult to distinguish from other members of its genus, such as G. glutinosus, the most common and widespread species.

G. oregonensis is found only in western North America, most commonly on the Pacific Coast. It is edible.

== Taxonomy ==
Gomphidius oregonensis was first described in 1897 by botanist Charles Horton Peck. The genus name is derived from the Greek γομφος, gomphos, meaning "nail-bolt" and relates to the shape of the mushroom. Oregonensis pertains to the area in which the species was first observed. Orson K. Miller made it the type species of the section Microsorus in the genus Gomphidius.

== Description ==
The cap is initially convex and almost peg-like, reaching 2–15 centimetres (3/4–6 in) in width. The surface is smooth and slimy when damp. The color can vary from whitish to a dull pinkish or color of salmon flesh when young. With maturity, the cap flattens, possibly becoming depressed, and turns purplish to reddish-brown. The flesh is soft and white or grayish.

The gills are decurrent, fairly even, closely spaced and are somewhat waxy in appearance. They are white to grayish in color, turning black as ripening occurs.

The stalk is up to 15 cm long and 1–5 cm thick. The diameter may be equal from top to bottom or either tapered or swollen at the base. The color transitions from a whitish shade in the upper portion above the veil to a bright yellow below.

The veil is whitish with a thread-like texture, hidden beneath a layer of slime. The veil seems to disappear as it approaches the stalk, where it forms a slimy, almost hairy ring. This ring often blackens as the mushrooms age and the spores begin to release.

The spores are smooth, spindle-shaped and elliptical, with each spore measuring 10–14 μm long, the smallest in the genus Gomphidius. The spore print is dark gray to black.

== Habitat and distribution ==
Gomphidius oregonensis can be found in western North America from October to December, most commonly on the Pacific Coast. It is found on the ground under conifers, particularly Douglas-fir. Mushrooms may be solitary or in clusters and often in colonies with G. glutinosus, and frequently with species from the genus Suillus. It is likely parasitic to Suillus caerulescens and potentially S. ponderosus as well.

== Edibility ==
Gomphidius oregonensis is edible, with a mild flavor and odor. Without proper preparation (removing the cap cuticle), the mushroom is slimy in texture. This mushroom also accumulates heavy metals.
