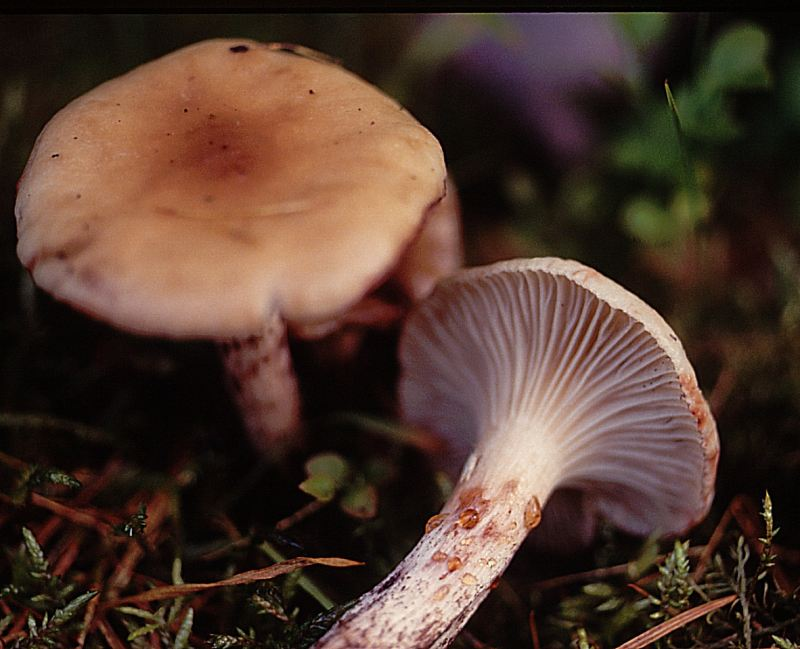

Scientific classification
- Kingdom: Fungi
- Division: Basidiomycota
- Class: Agaricomycetes
- Order: Boletales
- Family: Gomphidiaceae
- Genus: Gomphidius
- Species: G. maculatus

Binomial name
- Gomphidius maculatus (Scop.) Fr. (1838)

Synonyms
- Agaricus maculatus Scop. (1772); Gomphidius gracilis Berk (1854); Paxillus gracilis (Berk.) Quél. (1880); Gomphidius furcatus Peck (1899); Gomphidius maculatus var. furcatus (Peck) Singer (1949); Leucogomphidius maculatus (Scop.) Kotl. & Pouzar (1972)

= Gomphidius maculatus =

Species of mushroom-forming fungus

Gomphidius maculatus, commonly known as the larch slime spike, is a species of mushroom in the family Gomphidiaceae. It is widely distributed in Europe and North America, where it forms mycorrhizal associations with larch trees. It is an introduced species in New Zealand. While not known to be poisonous, it is slimy and could potentially accumulate heavy metals.

== Taxonomy ==
It was first described scientifically by naturalist Giovanni Antonio Scopoli in 1772. Elias Magnus Fries transferred it to the genus Gomphidius in 1838, giving it the name by which it is known today. The specific epithet maculatus is derived from the Latin word for "spotted". The type locality was Carniola, a historical region that now comprises parts of present-day Slovenia.

== Description ==
The cap (cap) of Gomphidius maculatus measures 2–9 cm in diameter and is initially convex, becoming plano-convex or flattened with maturity. Sometimes it may develop a slight umbo (central raised area). The cap surface is glutinous (sticky and slimy) in damp conditions and glabrous (smooth). Its colouration ranges from pinkish fawn to pale reddish-brown, often with light orange in the centre, fading to pallid pinkish fawn or dingy white towards the margins. A distinctive characteristic of this species is its tendency to readily stain black when damaged. The cap margins are strongly inrolled when young, becoming moderately inrolled at maturity.

The gills (lamellae are somewhat distant to distantly spaced, decurrent (running down the stipe), thick with bluntly rounded edges. They often branch dichotomously and may have transverse veins or wrinkles towards the margins. The gills are 2–8 mm deep, initially white, becoming dingy white and finally sooty grey at maturity.

The stipe is 3.5–10 cm long, tapering towards the base, measuring 7–11 mm in diameter at the apex and 4–7 mm at the base. It is central, solid or slightly stuffed, with longitudinal fibrils. The stem is white to dingy white, with a distinctive bright yellow colouration at the base, and readily blackens when handled. Numerous small glandular dots are present on the stem, initially reddish-brown but blackening with age. The flesh is white to brownish-white in the upper portion, slowly turning reddish when exposed to air, and yellow towards the base. The basal mycelium is yellow.

The spore print is dark grey, appearing black when deposited thickly. The spores are dark melleous (honey-coloured) to dark brown, subfusiform (somewhat spindle-shaped) with a slight depression or flattening in the suprahilar region (above the hilum), and measure 17.5–23.5 by 6.5–8 μm. They have slightly thickened walls, are smooth, and lack a germ pore.

When treated with chemical reagents, the context (flesh) of the fungus turns dull greyish-green with ferrous sulphate (FeSO_{4}) and rose pink darkening to brick red with ammonium hydroxide (NH_{4}OH). The fungus has a mild taste.

== Habitat and distribution ==
Gomphidius maculatus
- Mycological characteristics
- Gills on hymenium
- Cap is convex
- Hymenium is adnate
- Stipe is bare
- Spore print is olive to black
- Ecology is parasitic
- Edibility is not recommended or edible, but unpalatable

Gomphidius maculatus has a wide distribution in the northern hemisphere, where it forms mycorrhizal associations with larch trees. It has also been introduced to new Zealand.
