= Gomphidius borealis =

Scientific classification
- Domain: Eukaryota
- Kingdom: Fungi
- Division: Basidiomycota
- Class: Agaricomycetes
- Order: Boletales
- Family: Gomphidiaceae
- Genus: Gomphidius
- Species: G. borealis

Binomial name
- Gomphidius borealis O.K. Mill., Aime & Peintner, 2002

Species of fungus

Gomphidius borealis is a mushroom in the family Gomphidiaceae that is found in Siberia.
