= Gomphidius pseudomaculatus =

Scientific classification
- Domain: Eukaryota
- Kingdom: Fungi
- Division: Basidiomycota
- Class: Agaricomycetes
- Order: Boletales
- Family: Gomphidiaceae
- Genus: Gomphidius
- Species: G. pseudomaculatus

Binomial name
- Gomphidius pseudomaculatus O.K. Mill., 1971

Synonyms
- Leucogomphidius maculatus (O.K. Mill.) Kotl. & Pouzar (1972)

Species of fungus

Gomphidius pseudomaculatus is a mushroom in the family Gomphidiaceae that is found in Idaho in North America.
