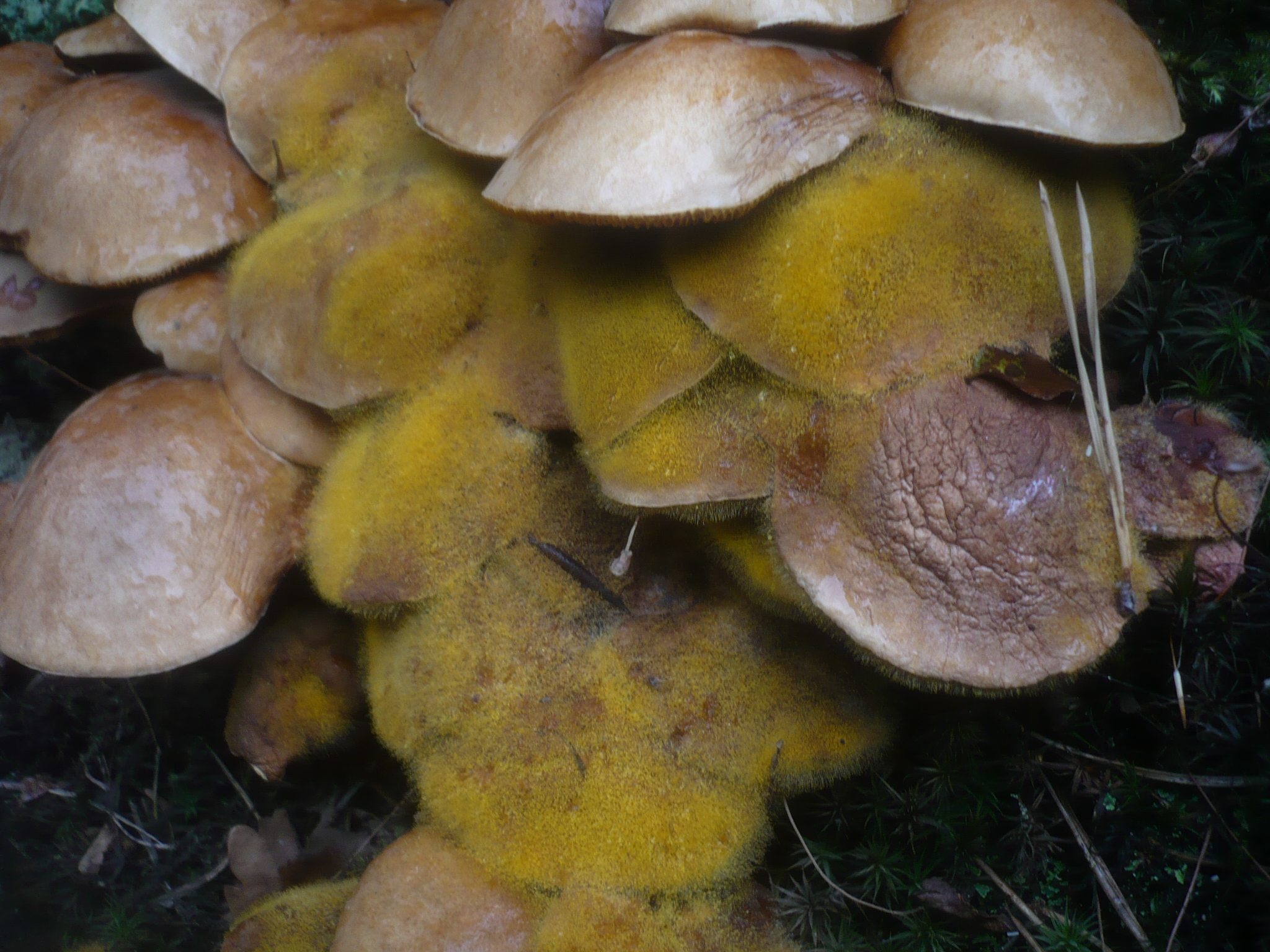
- on Suillus bovinus

Scientific classification
- Kingdom: Fungi
- Division: Mucoromycota
- Class: Mucoromycetes
- Order: Mucorales
- Family: Mucoraceae
- Genus: Dicranophora
- Species: D. fulva

Binomial name
- Dicranophora fulva J.Schröt. (1886)

Synonyms
- Thamnidium fulvum (J.Schröt.) Milko (1968)

= Dicranophora fulva =

Species of fungus

Dicranophora fulva is a mold of the family Mucoraceae. The species was described as new to science in 1886 by German mycologist Joseph Schröter, who first discovered it near Baden in 1877. Its species name is derived from the Latin fulvus "brown". The yellow mold has been reported from Europe and the United States. Although it is wide-ranging, it is not common. It grows exclusively on the decaying fruit bodies of Boletales. Known hosts include Suillus bovinus, S. cavipes, S. grevillei, Paxillus involutus, Chroogomphus rutilus, and Leccinum scabrum. It was not recorded after 1935 until Hermann Voglmayr and Irmgard Krisai-Greilhuber encountered it on a fungal field trip in southeastern Styria in 1994. Initially unable to identify it, they solved the mystery after checking older literature.

Dicranophora fulva was illustrated by botanist Charles Geoffrey Dobbs in 1938. The mold produces two types of sporangia: one type is tree-like in shape, with mostly single-spored sporangiola; the other type has a morphology more typical of the Mucorales. Zygospores produced by the fungus have irregular surface crevices. It appears to require high humidity and ample moisture, cool temperatures and abundant bolete mushrooms to flourish, a set of conditions more likely to occur in montane regions, which might explain the lack of records for this species. The mold becomes dormant in the autumn, but the circumstances that induce it to germinate are unknown.

It is unclear whether Dicranophora fulva is a mycoparasite (living off living material) or saprotrophite (living off dead or decaying material). It was initially thought to be the former, as are many Mucorales. However it is readily cultured on a wide variety of substrates such as bread and is hence suspected of being saprotrophic.
