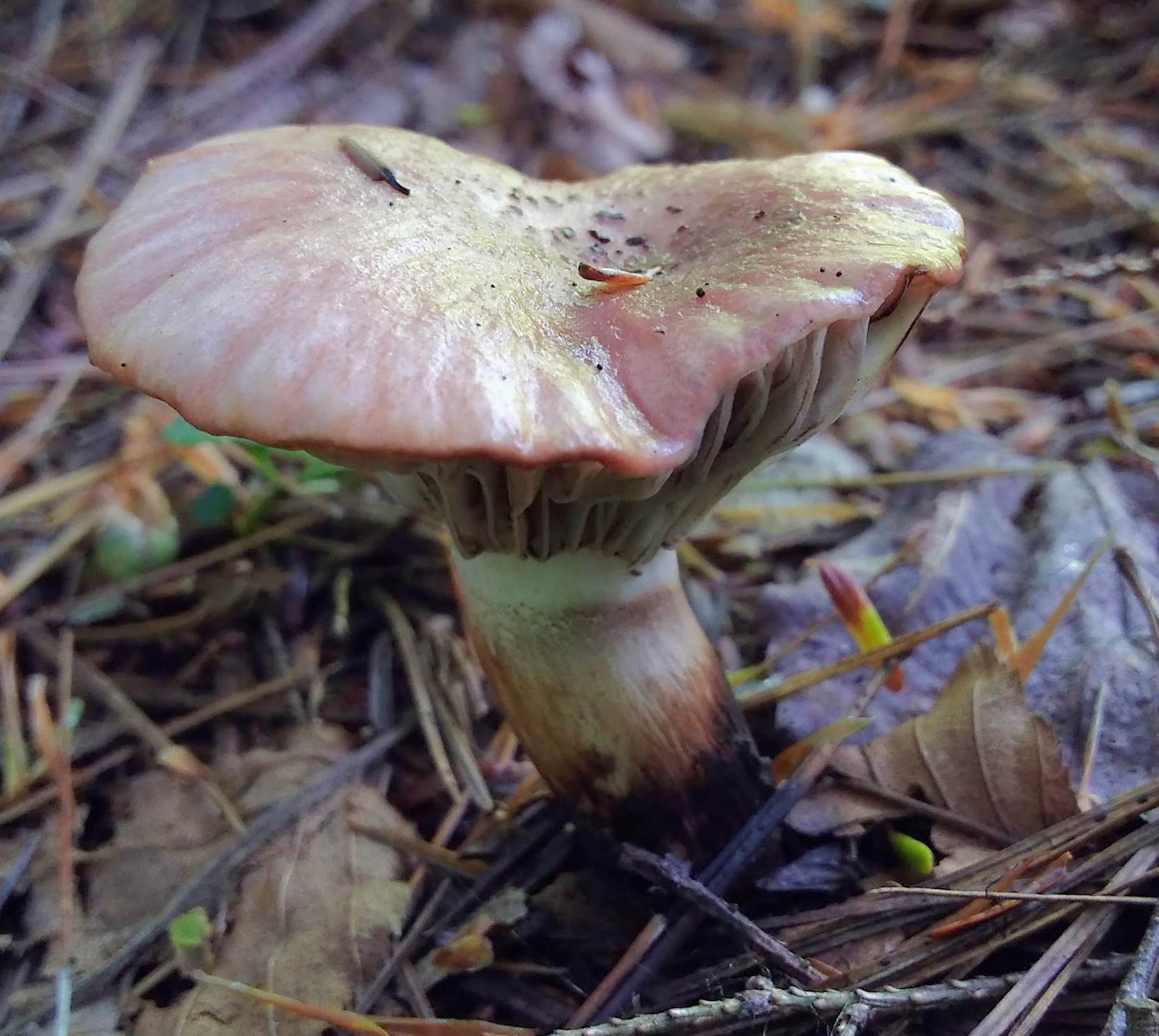

Scientific classification
- Domain: Eukaryota
- Kingdom: Fungi
- Division: Basidiomycota
- Class: Agaricomycetes
- Order: Boletales
- Family: Gomphidiaceae
- Genus: Gomphidius
- Species: G. nigricans

Binomial name
- Gomphidius nigricans Peck, 1897

Synonyms
- Leucogomphidius nigricans (O.K. Mill.) Kotl. & Pouzar (1972)

= Gomphidius nigricans =

Species of fungus

Gomphidius nigricans is a mushroom in the family Gomphidiaceae that is found in eastern North America to as far west as Michigan.
