= Gomphidius pseudoflavipes =

Scientific classification
- Domain: Eukaryota
- Kingdom: Fungi
- Division: Basidiomycota
- Class: Agaricomycetes
- Order: Boletales
- Family: Gomphidiaceae
- Genus: Gomphidius
- Species: G. pseudoflavipes

Binomial name
- Gomphidius pseudoflavipes O.K. Mill. & F.J. Camacho, 2003

Species of fungus

Gomphidius pseudoflavipes is a mushroom in the family Gomphidiaceae that is found in California in North America.
