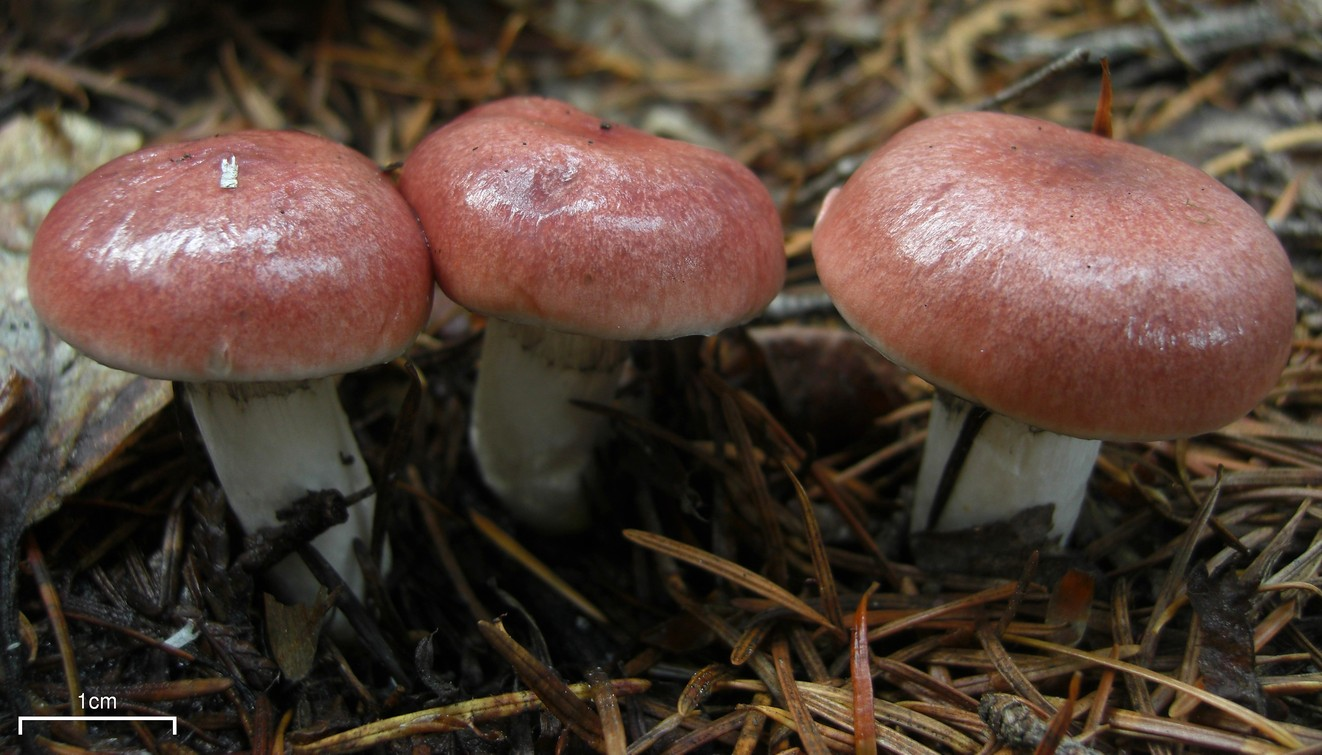

Scientific classification
- Kingdom: Fungi
- Division: Basidiomycota
- Class: Agaricomycetes
- Order: Boletales
- Family: Gomphidiaceae
- Genus: Gomphidius
- Species: G. subroseus

Binomial name
- Gomphidius subroseus Kauffman (1925)

Synonyms
- Leucogomphidius subroseus (Kauffman) Kotlába & Pouzar (1972)

= Gomphidius subroseus =

Species of fungus

Gomphidius subroseus
- Mycological characteristics
- Gills on hymenium
- Cap is convex or depressed
- Hymenium is decurrent
- Stipe is bare or has a ring
- Ecology is parasitic
- Edibility is edible but not recommended

Gomphidius subroseus, commonly known as the rosy gomphidius and rosy slimespike, is a species of gilled mushroom.

== Taxonomy ==
The species was first described by Calvin Henry Kauffman in 1925.

== Description ==
The cap is pinkish tan and up to 3–7 centimetres (1 1/4–2 3/4 in) wide. The stem is 3–7 cm long and about 1–2 cm wide. The veil may leave a ring. The gills are deeply decurrent and the spore print is dark gray to black.

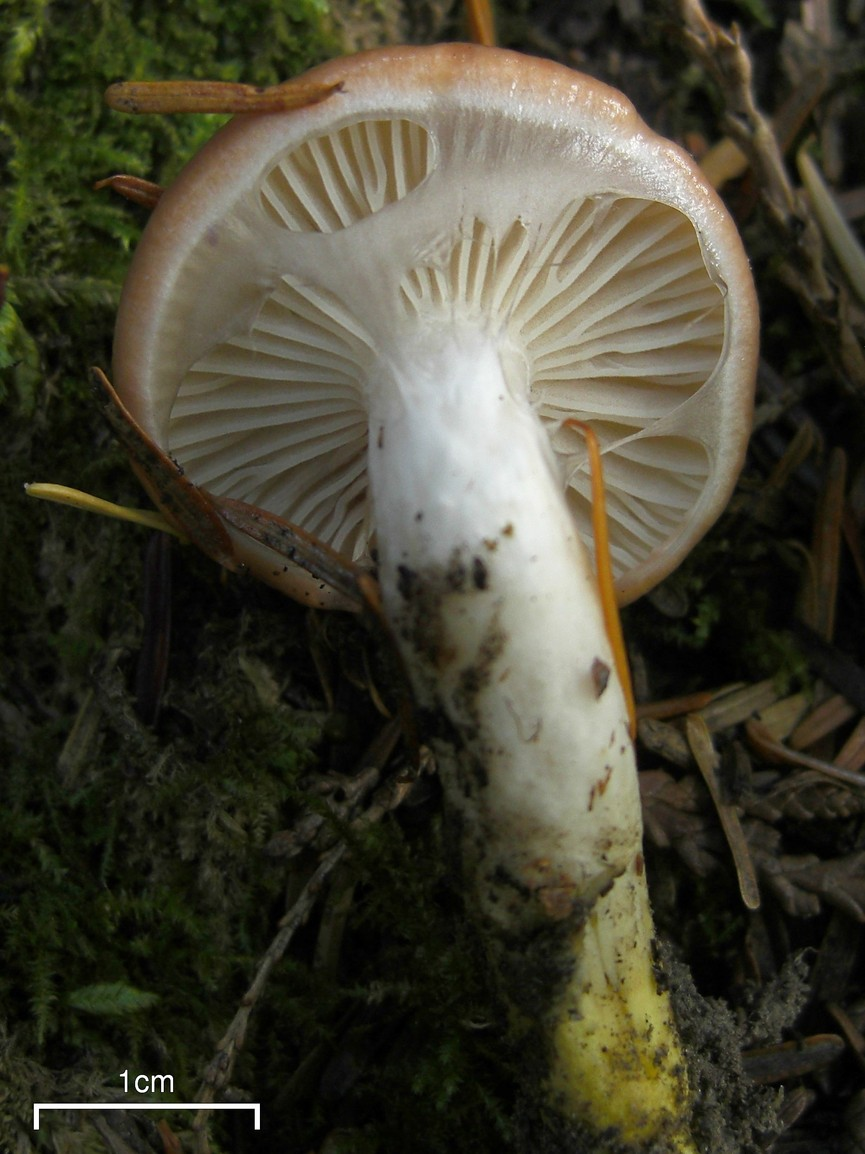
Cap underside

=== Similar species ===
Gomphidius smithii has a less pink cap. The pink pigment of Hygrophorus caps is less defined and the gills are primarily adnate.

== Distribution and habitat ==
It is found in Europe and North America. It appears from July to September in the Mountain states and September–November on the West Coast.

== Ecology ==
It was once thought to be mycorrhizal with Pinus sylvestris. However, Olson et al. (2002) found it to be more likely to be parasitic on Suillus bovinus, which is apparently mycorrhizal with P. sylvestris.

== Edibility ==
It is considered edible but of low quality. As with other species of the genus, removing the glutinous cuticle improves the taste. It is an accumulator of heavy metals.

== See also ==
- Gomphidius glutinosus
