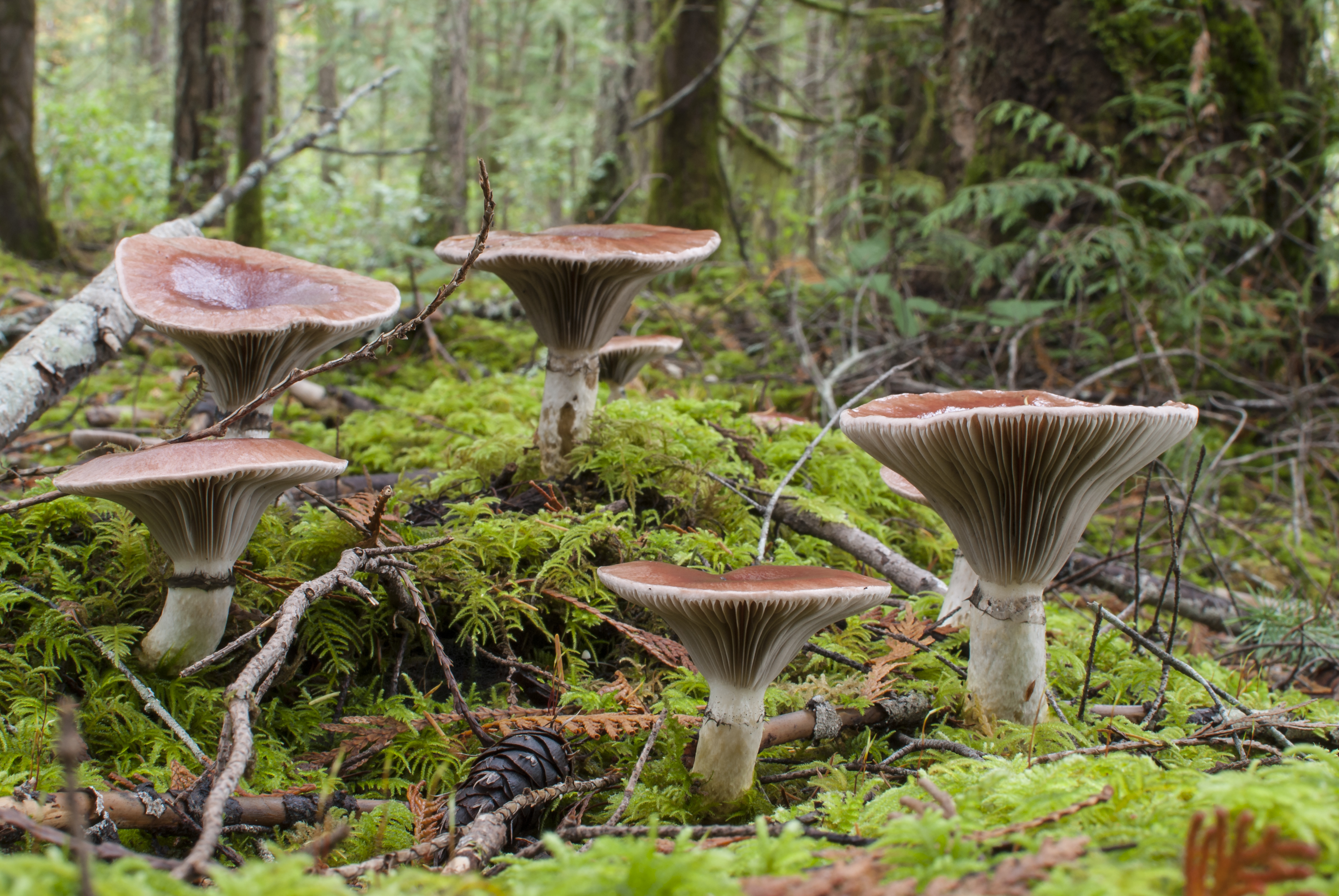

Scientific classification
- Domain: Eukaryota
- Kingdom: Fungi
- Division: Basidiomycota
- Class: Agaricomycetes
- Order: Boletales
- Family: Gomphidiaceae
- Genus: Gomphidius
- Species: G. largus

Binomial name
- Gomphidius largus O.K.Miller

= Gomphidius largus =

Species of fungus

Gomphidius largus is a fungus native to North America.
