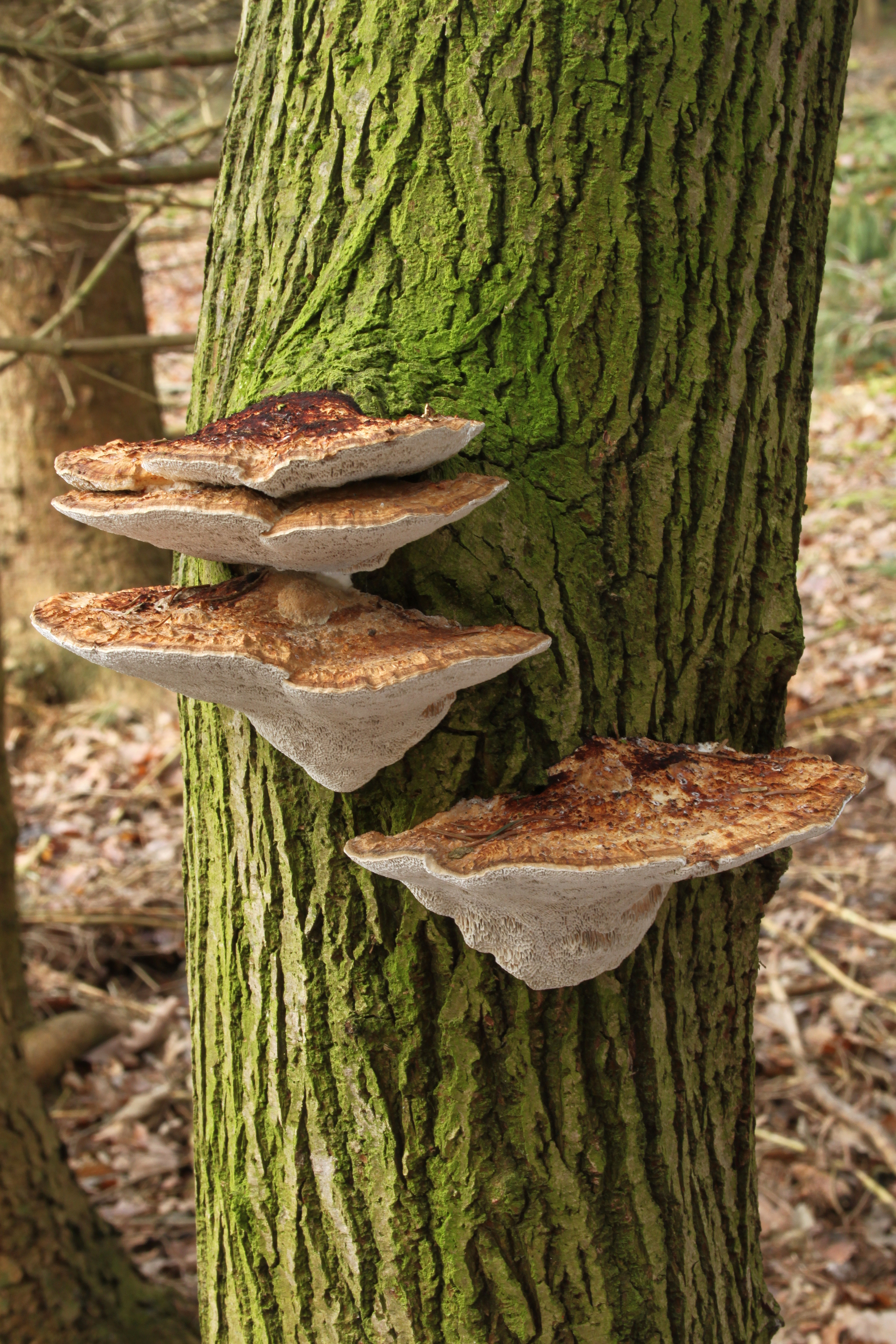
- Blushing brackets in Erbach, Germany

Scientific classification
- Kingdom: Fungi
- Division: Basidiomycota
- Class: Agaricomycetes
- Order: Polyporales
- Family: Polyporaceae
- Genus: Daedaleopsis
- Species: D. confragosa

Binomial name
- Daedaleopsis confragosa (Bolton) J.Schröt. (1888)

Synonyms
- Boletus confragosus Bolton (1791); Daedalea confragosa (Bolton) Pers. (1801); Trametes confragosa (Bolton) Rabenhorst (1844); Polyporus confragosus (Bolton) P.Kumm. (1871); Striglia confragosa (Bolton) Kuntze (1891); Lenzites confragosa (Bolton) Pat. (1900); Agaricus confragosus (Bolton) Murrill (1905); Daedalea confragosa f. bulliardii (Fr.) Domański, Orloś & Skirg. (1967); Ischnoderma confragosum (Bolton) Zmitr. (2001)

= Daedaleopsis confragosa =

Species of fungus

Daedaleopsis confragosa
- Mycological characteristics
- Pores on hymenium
- No distinct cap
- Hymenium is decurrent
- Lacks a stipe
- Spore print is white
- Ecology is parasitic
- Edibility is inedible

Daedaleopsis confragosa, commonly known as the thin-walled maze polypore or the blushing bracket, is a species of polypore fungus in the family Polyporaceae. The species was first described from Europe in 1791 as a form of Boletus, and has undergone several changes of genus in its taxonomic history. It acquired its current name when Joseph Schröter transferred it to Daedaleopsis in 1888.

A plant pathogen, it causes a white rot of injured hardwoods, especially willows. The fruit bodies are semicircular and tough, have a concentrically zoned brownish upper surface, and measure up to 20 cm (8 in) in diameter. The whitish underside turns gray-brown as the fruit body ages, but bruises pink or red. It is found all year and is common in northern temperate woodlands of Eurasia and eastern North America.

== Taxonomy ==
Daedaleopsis confragosa was first described scientifically under the name Boletus confragosus by English naturalist James Bolton, in his 1791 work An History of Fungusses, growing about Halifax. He reported finding specimens on old trees near Fixby Hall, and having specimens sent to him from Darlington. The species has been shuffled between several genera in its taxonomic history: Daedalea by Christian Hendrik Persoon in 1801; Trametes by Gottlob Ludwig Rabenhorst in 1844; Polyporus by Paul Kummer in 1871; Stigila by Otto Kuntze in 1891; Lenzites by Patouillard in 1900; Agaricus by William Alphonso Murrill in 1905; and Ischnoderma by Ivan Zmitrovich in 2001. It was transferred to its current genus, Daedaleopsis, by German mycologist Joseph Schröter in 1888. D. confragosa is the type species of the genus Daedaleopsis.

Several varieties have been described. L. Ljubarskii published var. bulliardi and var. rubecens in 1975. Both of these varieties were published invalidly are not considered to have independent taxonomic significance: variety rubescens is folded into synonymy with the main variety, while variety bulliardi is now considered synonymous with Trametes suaveolens. Variety tricolor, proposed by Appollinaris Semenovich Bondartsev and Rolf Singer in 1953, is now the independent species Daedaleopsis tricolor. Bondartsev described the form sibirica in 1953, but this is also no longer independent.

The polypore has acquired several vernacular names, including "thin-maze flat polypore", "thin walled maze polypore", "blood-stained bracket", and "blushing bracket". The latter name refers to its characteristic bruising reaction. James Bolton referred to it as the "rugged boletus".

== Description ==
The shelflike or bracketlike fruit body is fan-shaped to semicircular, and typically measures 5–15 cm (2–6 in) in diameter, and up to 2 cm (0.8 in) thick. Its upper surface is broadly convex to flat, dry, smooth to somewhat hairy, and usually has concentric zone lines. Its color ranges from reddish brown to brown to grayish, sometimes becoming blackish in maturity. The cap surface may have an umbo at the point of attachment to the substrate. Fruit bodies are leathery to corky when moist, but become hard and rigid when dry. The flesh is white to pinkish to brownish and tough. The underside of the fruit bodies features tiny pores measuring about 0.5–1.5 mm in diameter. They are white to tan to brown, but will develop pinkish or reddish tones if bruised. Pore shape is highly variable, ranging from circular to elongated, to mazelike, to gill-like. The tubes are up to 1.5 cm (0.6 in) long. The fruit body lacks a stalk, as the shelf attaches directly to the substrate. The fruit bodies have no distinctive odor and a slightly bitter taste.

The spore print is white; spores are cylindrical, smooth, and measure 7–11 by 2–3 μm. The basidia (spore-bearing cells) have a shape ranging from cylindrical to club-shaped, and dimensions of 20–40 by 3–5 μm. The hymenium features numerous hyphidia (modified terminal hyphae), which measure 2–3 μm. The hyphal system of Daedaleopsis confragrosa is trimitic, meaning that there are three types of hyphae in the fruit body: skeletal hyphae, which provide structural support, are thick walled, measuring 3–7 μm in diameter; generative hyphae, responsible for new growth, can be either thin- or thick-walled, may contain clamps, and measure 2–6 μm; binding hyphae, thick-walled and much branched, are 2–5 μm.

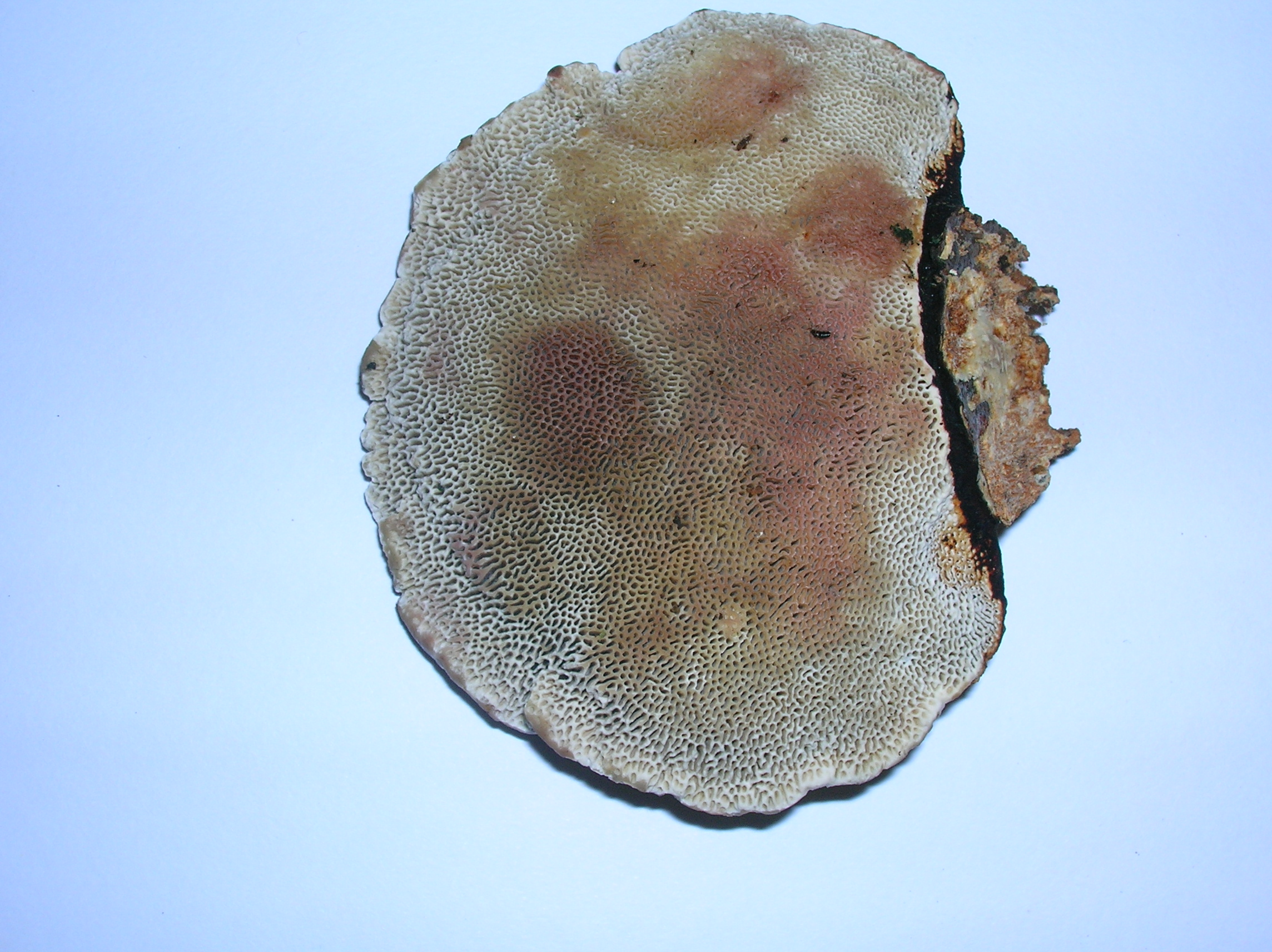
Bruising on pore surface

=== Similar species ===
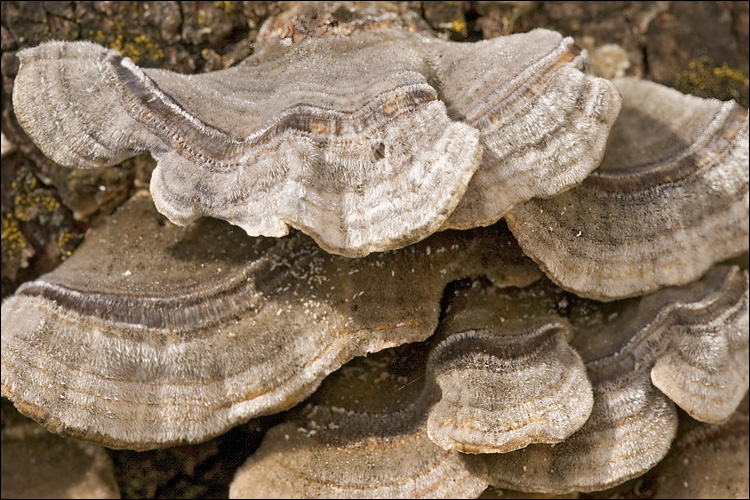
Cerrena unicolor

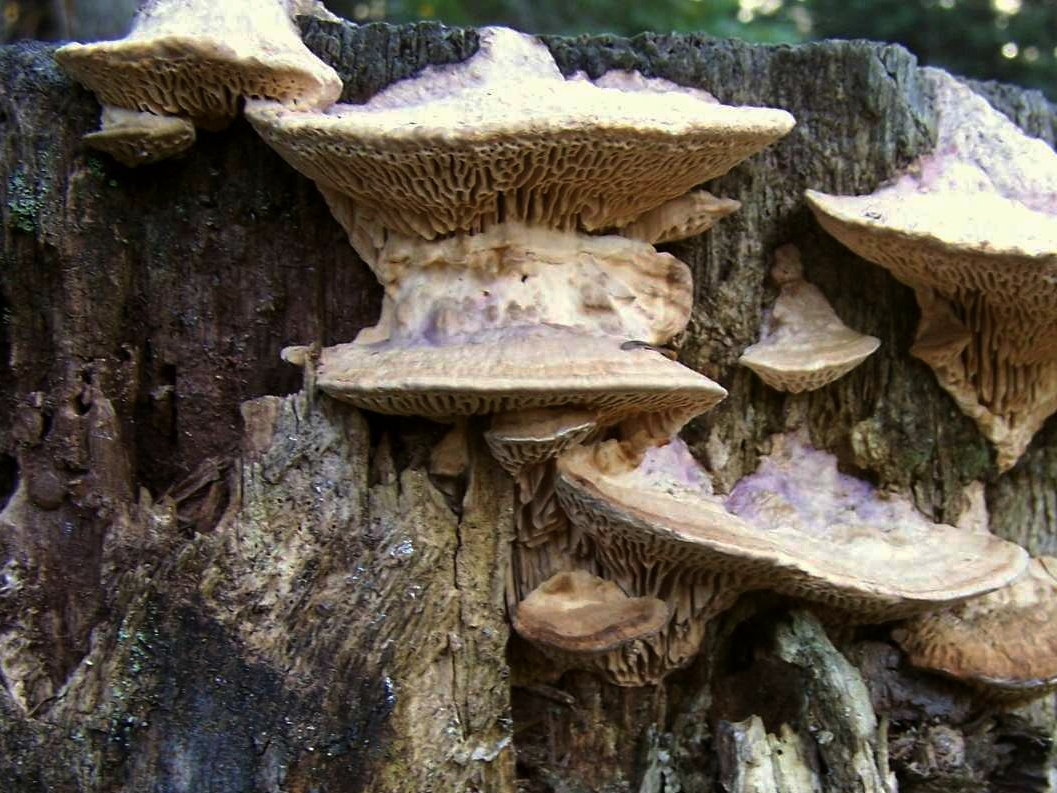
Daedalea quercina

Cerrena unicolor (formerly Daedalea unicolor) is a common polypore species with a maze-like pore surface that can resemble D. confragosa. It can be distinguished by its thinner fruit bodies, a black line in the flesh, and the way that the tubes often break into irregular flattened teeth in maturity. Daedalea quercina, common on oak, has a larger fruit body up to 20 cm (8 in) in diameter and 1–8 cm (0.4–3.1 in) thick, and its pore surface is more distinctively labyrinthine (maze-like). It causes a brown heart rot, where carbohydrates are removed from the inner heartwood, leaving brownish, oxidized lignin.

== Ecology and distribution ==
Daedaleopsis confragosa is a lignicolous fungus that produces a decay of sapwood. It causes white rot, a type of wood decay in which lignin is degraded and cellulose remains as a light-colored residue. The fruit bodies grow singly or in groups, sometimes in tiers, in the wounds of living trees. Its preferred host is willow, but it has also been found on birch and other hardwoods. Fruiting usually occurs from June to December, but the hard shelves can persist year-round. In North America, the species is most common in eastern locales, but rare in western regions. It is common in Europe, and is one of the 100 most common fungi in the United Kingdom. Its European range extends east to the Urals. In Asia it is widely distributed, having been recorded from China, western Maharashtra (India), Iran, and Japan.

The fruit bodies are popular among fungus-loving beetles. In a Russian study, 54 species from 16 families in the Coleoptera complex were recorded using the fungus; the most common were Cis comptus, Sillcacis affinis (Ciidae), Tritoma subbasalis, Dacne bipustulata (Erotylidae), Mycetophagus multipunctatus, M. piceus (Mycetophagidae), and Thymalus oblongus (Trogossitidae).

== Bioactive compounds ==
The triterpenes 3α-carboxyacetoxyquercinic acid, 3α-carboxyacetoxy-24-methylene-23-oxolanost-8-en-26-oic acid, and 5α,8α-epidioxyergosta-6,22-dien-3β-ol (ergosterol peroxide) have been isolated from D. confragosa. Lectins from D. confragosa, tested against rabbit and human erythrocytes, were determined to have anti-H serological specificity.

Analysis of the lipid and fatty acid composition revealed that D. confragosa contains 20.1% total lipids (mg/g dry weight), 32.9% neutral lipids, 53.8% phospholipid, and 13.3% glycolipids. An analysis of hydroxy fatty acid content showed that D. confragosa contains, as a percentage of total fatty acids, 0.02% 7-hydroxy-8,14-dimethyl-9-hexadecenoic acid and 0.01% 7-hydroxy-8,16-dimethyl-9-octadecenoic acid.

== Uses ==
The polypore is used in ornamental paper making, whereby the fruit bodies are pulped, pressed, and dried to produce sheets with unusual textures and colors.

It is inedible.
