= Cystogomphus =

Scientific classification
- Kingdom: Fungi
- Division: Basidiomycota
- Class: Agaricomycetes
- Order: Boletales
- Family: Gomphidiaceae
- Genus: Cystogomphus; Singer (1942)

Type species
- Cystogomphus humblotii Singer (1942)

Genus of fungi

Cystogomphus is a fungal genus in the family Gomphidiaceae. Circumscribed by American mycologist Rolf Singer in 1942, the genus is monotypic, containing the single species Cystogomphus humblotii, originally described from France.
