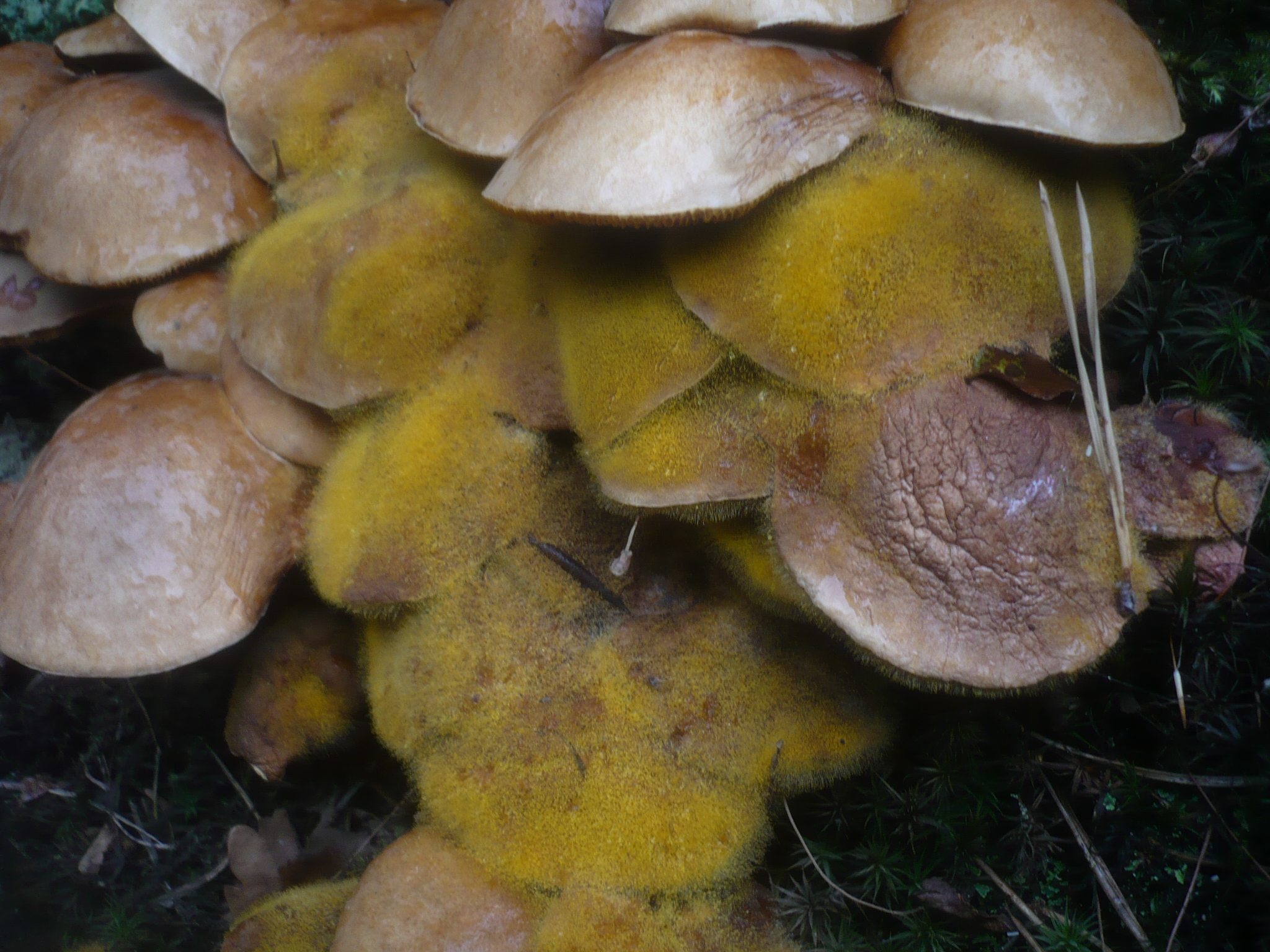
- Dicranophora fulva on Suillus bovinus

Scientific classification
- Kingdom: Fungi
- Division: Mucoromycota
- Class: Mucoromycetes
- Order: Mucorales
- Family: Mucoraceae
- Genus: Dicranophora; J.Schröt. (1886)

Type species
- Dicranophora fulva J.Schröt. (1886)

Species
- D. fulva D. paradoxa

= Dicranophora (fungus) =

Genus of fungi

Dicranophora is a genus of two mold species in the family Mucoraceae. It was circumscribed by German mycologist Joseph Schröter in 1886. The type species is Dicranophora fulva, a yellow mold that grows on the fruit bodies of bolete mushrooms.
