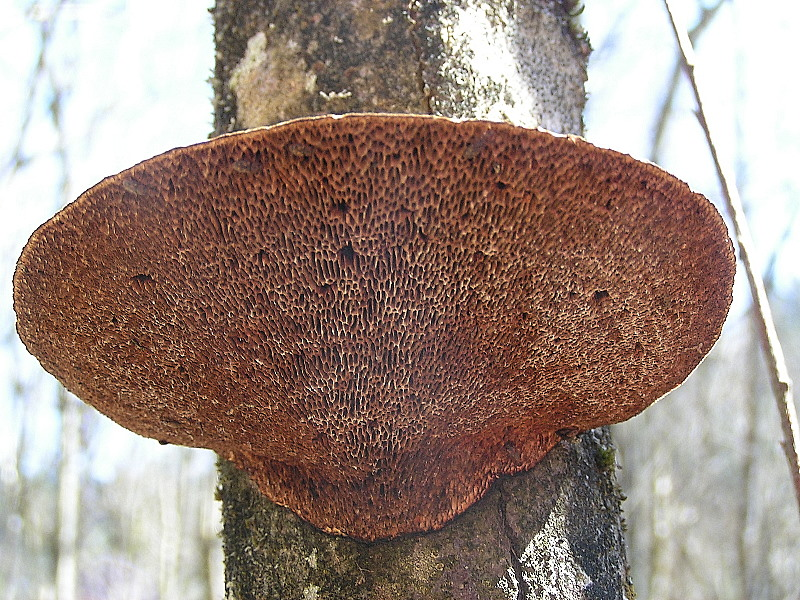
- Daedaleopsis confragosa

Scientific classification
- Domain: Eukaryota
- Kingdom: Fungi
- Division: Basidiomycota
- Class: Agaricomycetes
- Order: Polyporales
- Family: Polyporaceae
- Genus: Daedaleopsis; J.Schröt. (1888)

Type species
- Daedaleopsis confragosa (Bolton) J.Schröt. (1888)

= Daedaleopsis =

Genus of fungi

Daedaleopsis is a genus of fungi in the family Polyporaceae. The name Daedaleopsis is a reference to Daedalus, the labyrinth-maker of myth. Similarly, the maze-like pattern of pores is taxonomically described as being daedaloid. DNA was recovered and sequenced from fragments of a nearly 7000-year-old fruit body of D. tricolor found in an early Neolithic village in Rome.

== Taxonomy ==
The genus was circumscribed by German mycologist Joseph Schröter in 1888.

== Description ==
Daedaleopsis fungi have basidiocarps that are annual, with a cap or effused-reflexed (crust-like with the edges forming cap-like structures). Their colour is pale brown to deep red, zonate, with a mostly smooth cap surface, lamellate to tubular hymenophore, and a pale brown context. Microscopic features include a trimitic hyphal system with clamped generative hyphae, and the presence of dendrohyphidia. Daedaleopsis has hyaline, thin-walled, and slightly curved cylindrical spores that are negative in Melzer's reagent and Cotton Blue.

== Habitat and distribution ==
Daedaleopsis fungi cause white rot, and are widely distributed in the Northern Hemisphere.

== Species ==
A 2008 estimate placed six species in the genus. As of October 2016, Index Fungorum accepts 10 species of Daedaleopsis:

- Daedaleopsis conchiformis Imazeki (1943) – Japan
- Daedaleopsis confragosa (Bolton) J.Schröt. (1888)
- Daedaleopsis dickinsii (Berk. ex Cooke) Bondartsev (1963)
- Daedaleopsis hainanensis Hai J.Li & S.H.He (2016) – China
- Daedaleopsis nipponica Imazeki (1943) – Japan
- Daedaleopsis nitida (Durieu & Mont.) Zmitr. & Malysheva (2013)
- Daedaleopsis papyraceoresupinata (S.Ito & S.Imai) Imazeki (1943)
- Daedaleopsis pergamenea (Berk. & Broome) Ryvarden (1984)
- Daedaleopsis septentrionalis (P.Karst.) Niemelä (1982)
- Daedaleopsis sinensis (Lloyd) Y.C.Dai (1996) – China
- Daedaleopsis tricolor (Bull.) Bondartsev & Singer (1941)
