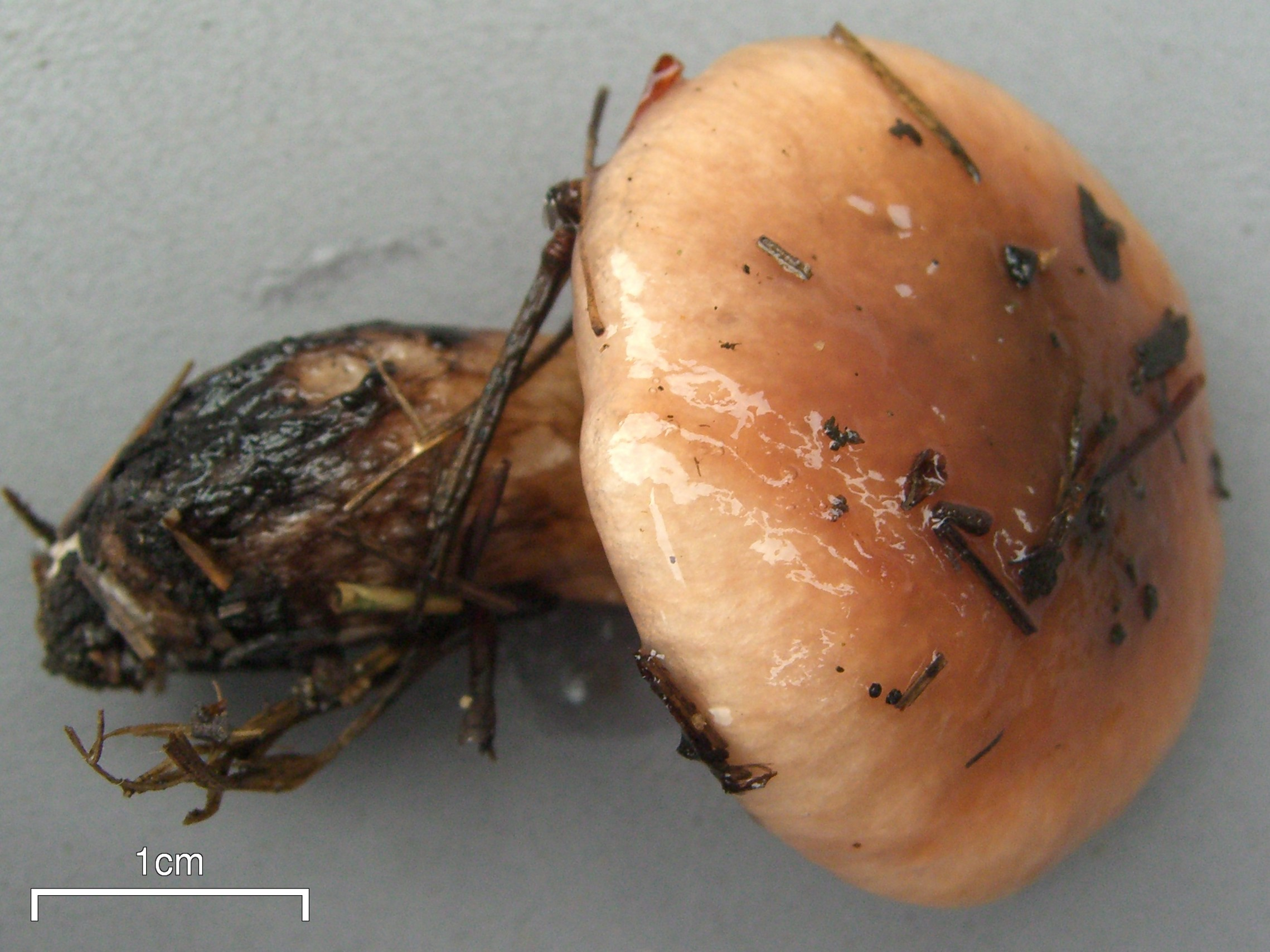

Scientific classification
- Kingdom: Fungi
- Division: Basidiomycota
- Class: Agaricomycetes
- Order: Boletales
- Family: Gomphidiaceae
- Genus: Gomphidius
- Species: G. smithii

Binomial name
- Gomphidius smithii Singer, 1948

Synonyms
- Leucogomphidius smithii (Singer) Kotl. & Pouzar (1972)

= Gomphidius smithii =

Species of mushroom

Gomphidius smithii, commonly known as Smith's slime spike, is a species of mushroom in the family of Gomphidiaceae. It is found in the Pacific Northwest. It accumulates heavy metals.

== Description ==
The cap of Gomphidius smithii is about 1.5-7 centimeters in diameter. It starts out rounded, before becoming convex and eventually flat. The surface of the cap is slimy. The stipe is about 4-7 centimeters long and 0.5-1 centimeters wide, with a veil. Unlike many other Gomphidius species, G. smithii is not yellow at the base of the stipe. The gills are decurrent and start out white, before graying with age. The spore print is dark gray, sometimes almost black.

== Habitat and ecology ==
Gomphidius smithii is found under douglas fir trees. It grows in association with and is likely parasitic to Suillus lakei, a mycorrhizal fungus that grows in association with douglas fir. It may also grow in association with other Suillus species.
