= Daedaleopsis hainanensis =

Scientific classification
- Domain: Eukaryota
- Kingdom: Fungi
- Division: Basidiomycota
- Class: Agaricomycetes
- Order: Polyporales
- Family: Polyporaceae
- Genus: Daedaleopsis
- Species: D. hainanensis

Binomial name
- Daedaleopsis hainanensis Hai J.Li & S.H.He (2016)

Species of fungus

Daedaleopsis hainanensis is a species of white rot poroid fungus that is found in tropical China. It was described as a new species in 2016 by mycologists Hai-Jiao Li and Shuang-Hui He. The type was collected in Jianfengling Nature Reserve (Ledong County, Hainan), where it was found growing on a fallen angiosperm trunk. It is one of five Daedaleopsis species that have been recorded in China.

== Description ==
The fungus is characterized by fruit bodies that are annual, sessile, fan-shaped, dimidiate, or semicircular. The cap surface is smooth, yellowish-brown, and has concentric parallel grooves. Fresh specimens have a rose to pink margin around the pore surface; the pores are round, numbering 3–4 per millimetre. D. hainanensis has a trimitic hyphal system, and the generative hyphae have clamp connections. There are dendrohyphidia and hyphal pegs in the hymenium. spores are sausage shaped to cylindrical, measuring 6–8 by 1.7–2.2 μm.
