= Gomphogaster =

Scientific classification
- Kingdom: Fungi
- Division: Basidiomycota
- Class: Agaricomycetes
- Order: Boletales
- Family: Gomphidiaceae
- Genus: Gomphogaster; O.K.Mill. (1973)

Type species
- Gomphogaster leucosarx O.K.Mill. (1973)

Genus of fungi

Gomphogaster is a fungal genus in the family Gomphidiaceae. Circumscribed in 1972 by American mycologist Orson K. Miller, Jr., the genus is monotypic, containing the single gasteroid species Gomphogaster leucosarx, found in the United States.
