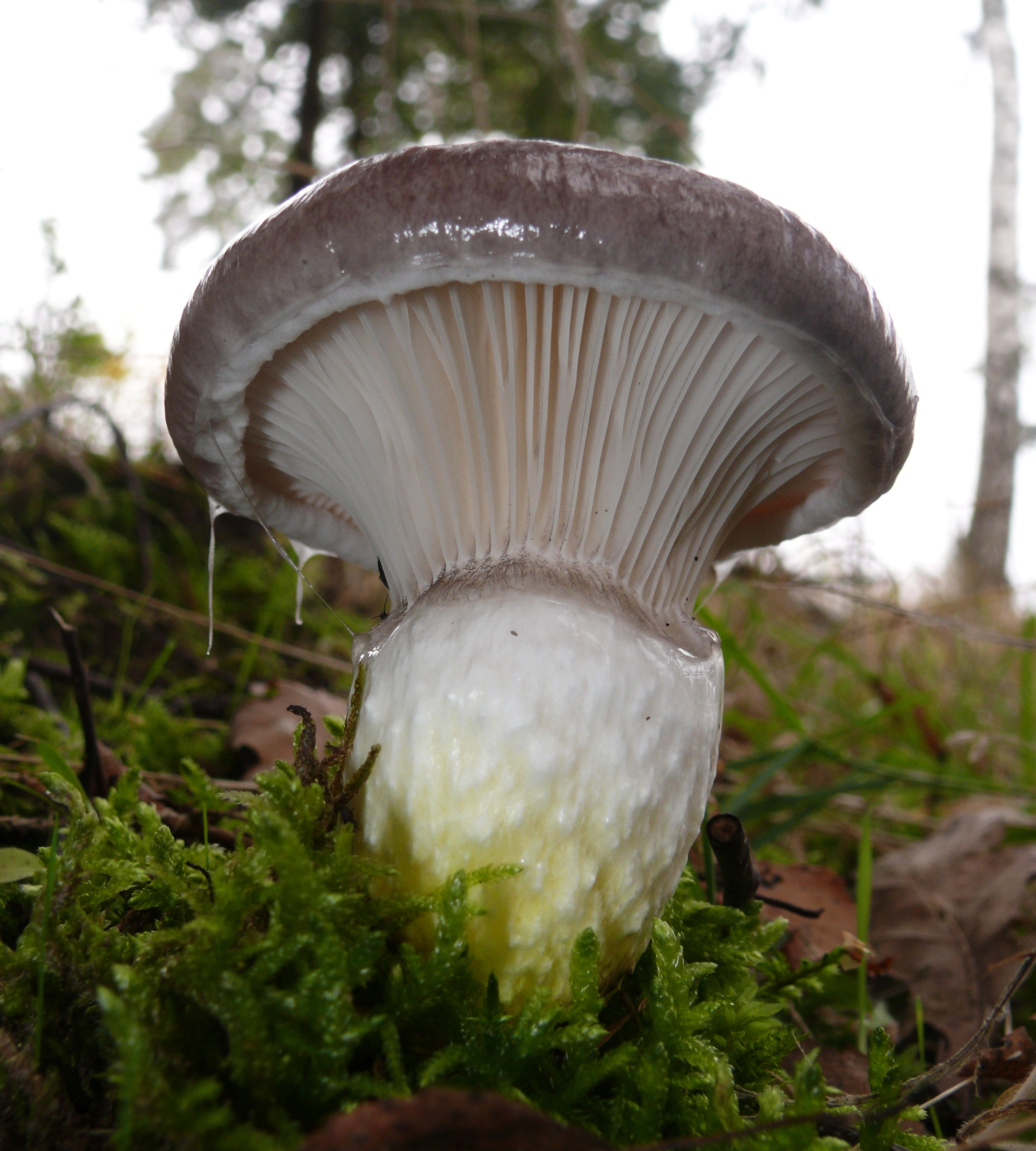
- Gomphidius glutinosus

Scientific classification
- Kingdom: Fungi
- Division: Basidiomycota
- Class: Agaricomycetes
- Order: Boletales
- Family: Gomphidiaceae
- Genus: Gomphidius; Fr. (1836)

Type species
- Gomphidius glutinosus (Schaeff.) Fr. (1838)

= Gomphidius =

Genus of mushrooms

Gomphidius is a genus of mushrooms, commonly known as spike-caps, that are members of the Boletales (suborder Suillineae), or pored fungi. They appear to have gill-like structures which resemble those of agarics, however the similarity is superficial only. The best-known member is the slimy spike-cap (Gomphidius glutinosus). The genus has a widespread distribution, especially in north temperate areas, and contains 10 species.

== Taxonomy ==
Elias Magnus Fries initially described the genus as Agaricus subgenus Gomphus in 1821, before renaming it Gomphidius in 1825.

The genus gives its name to the family Gomphidiaceae. Despite being agaricoid (bearing gills) the genus (and family) belong to the Boletales (suborder Suillineae). The related genus Chroogomphus (whose species were once classified in Gomphidius), is distinguished by the lack of a partial veil.

The genus name is derived from the Greek 'γομφος' gomphos meaning 'plug' or 'large wedge-shaped nail'.

Fries did not designate a type species, but G. glutinosus was later designated the lectotype as it was the first species listed.

Miller subdivided the genus into three sections, section Microsporus, typified by small spores, with G. oregonensis as the type, section Roseogomphus, typified by large spores and pink cap, with G. subroseus as its type, and section Gomphidius.

Miller published a molecular analysis of the Gomphidiaceae in 2003, though material was not available from all taxa. The results showed G. flavipes and G. pseudoflavipes were sister taxa and their lineage was sister to a Japan-provenance material of G. roseus. G. glutinosus and G. oregonensis were sister taxa with G. smithii, G. subroseus and G. nigricans as progressively earlier offshoots. G. maculatus diverged from the ancestor of these eight species, and Gomphidius borealis may be an early offshoot that is basal to the split between Chroogomphus and Gomphidius. Miller suggested that the gasteroid species Gomphogaster leucosarx may lie within Gomphidius but did not analyse that taxon genetically.

=== List of species ===
Image	Scientific name	Year	Distribution
	Gomphidius alachuanus Murrill	1939	Florida
	Gomphidius albipes Yu Li & L.L. Qi	2017	northeastern China
	Gomphidius borealis O.K. Mill., Aime & Peintner	2002	Siberia
	Gomphidius flavipes Peck	1900	North America
	Gomphidius glutinosus (Schaeff.) Fr. Slimy spike-cap	1838	Europe & North America.
	Gomphidius griseovinaceus Kalamees	1986	
	Gomphidius largus O.K. Mill.	1971	North America
	Gomphidius maculatus (Scop.) Fr.	1838	North America
	Gomphidius nigricans Peck	1897	North America
	Gomphidius oregonensis Peck	1898	North America
	Gomphidius pseudoflavipes O.K. Mill. & F.J. Camacho	2003	North America
	Gomphidius pseudoglutinosus K. Das, Hembrom, A. Parihar & Vizzini	2020	
	Gomphidius pseudomaculatus O.K. Mill.	1971	North America
	Gomphidius roseus (Fr.) Oudem.	1867	Europe
	Gomphidius smithii Singer	1948 [1946]	North America
	Gomphidius subroseus Kauffman	1925	North America
	Gomphidius tyrrhenicus D. Antonini & M. Antonini	2004	Italy and Spain

== Description ==
The members of the genus have pink- to purple-, grey- or brown-tinted caps that have a sticky surface and a varnished appearance when dry. They have white gills.

== Distribution and habitat ==
The genus occurs in coniferous forests throughout North America, Eurasia and North Africa. Gomphidius species associate with members of the subfamilies Piceoideae (Picea), Laricoideae (Larix and Pseudotsuga) and Abietoideae (Abies and Tsuga) within the Pinaceae.
