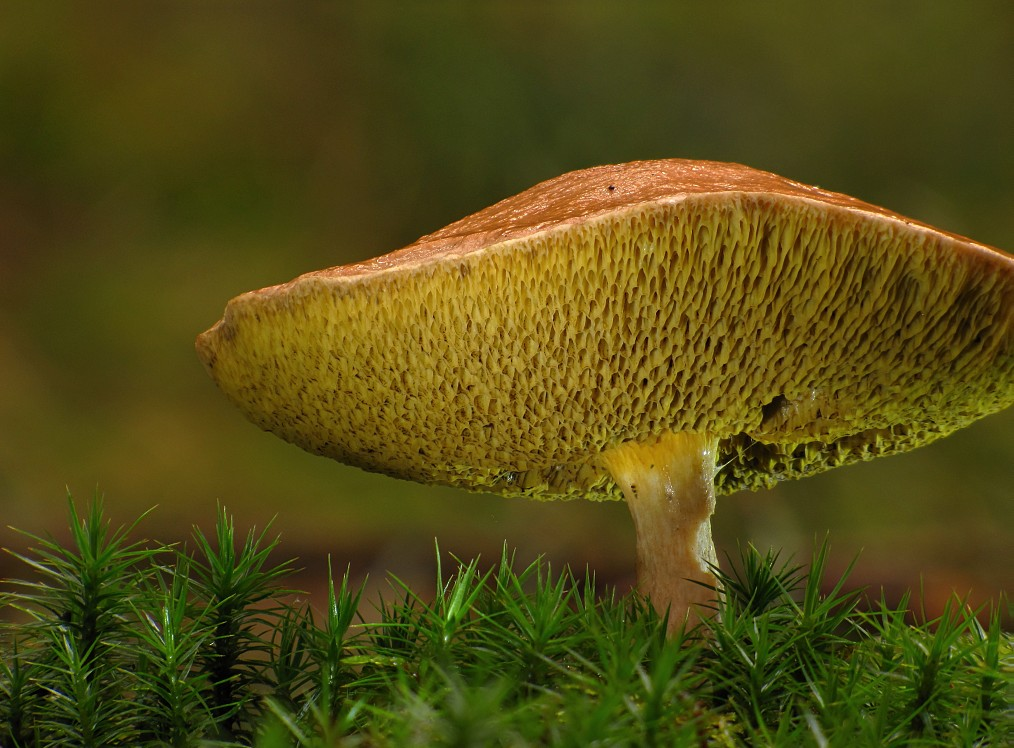
- Suillus bovinus Pine woods, Galicia

Conservation status
- Least Concern (IUCN 3.1)

Scientific classification
- Kingdom: Fungi
- Division: Basidiomycota
- Class: Agaricomycetes
- Order: Boletales
- Family: Suillaceae
- Genus: Suillus
- Species: S. bovinus

Binomial name
- Suillus bovinus (L.) Roussel (1806)

Synonyms
- Boletus bovinus L. (1753); Agaricus bovinus (L.) Lam. (1783); Ixocomus bovinus (L.) Quél. (1888); Mariaella bovina (L.) Šutara (1987)

= Suillus bovinus =

Species of edible fungus in the family Suillaceae native to Europe and Asia

Suillus bovinus
- Mycological characteristics
- Pores on hymenium
- Cap is convex
- Hymenium is adnate or decurrent
- Stipe is bare
- Spore print is olive-brown
- Ecology is mycorrhizal
- Edibility is edible

Suillus bovinus, also known as the Jersey cow mushroom or bovine bolete, is a pored mushroom of the genus Suillus in the family Suillaceae. It was initially described as Boletus bovinus by Carl Linnaeus in 1753, and given its current binomial name by Henri François Anne de Roussel in 1806.

Suillus bovinus produces spore-bearing fruit bodies, often in large numbers, above ground. The mushroom has a convex grey-yellow or ochre cap reaching up to 10 cm (4 in) in diameter, which flattens with age. Like other boletes, it has tubes extending downward from the underside of the cap, rather than gills; spores escape at maturity through the tube openings, or pores. The pore surface is yellow. The stipe, more slender than those of other Suillus boletes, lacks a ring.

A common fungus native to Eurasia, it has been introduced to North America and Australia. The fungus grows in coniferous forests in its native range, and pine plantations in countries where it has become naturalised. It forms symbiotic ectomycorrhizal associations with living trees by enveloping the tree's underground roots with sheaths of fungal tissue, and is sometimes parasitised by the related mushroom Gomphidius roseus. Suillus bovinus is edible, but not highly regarded.

== Taxonomy ==
Suillus bovinus was one of the many species first described in 1753 by the "father of taxonomy" Carl Linnaeus, who, in the second volume of his Species Plantarum, gave it the name Boletus bovinus. The specific epithet is derived from the Latin word bos, meaning "cattle". The fungus was reclassified in (and became the type species of) the genus Suillus by French naturalist Henri François Anne de Roussel in 1796. Suillus is an ancient term for fungi, and is derived from the word "swine". Lucien Quélet classified it as Viscipellis bovina in 1886.

In works published before 1987, the species was written fully as Suillus bovinus (L.:Fr.) Kuntze, as the description by Linnaeus had been name sanctioned in 1821 by the "father of mycology", Swedish naturalist Elias Magnus Fries. The description starting date for all the mycota had been set by general agreement as 1 January 1821, the date of Fries's work. Furthermore, as Roussel's description of Suillus predated this as well, the authority for the genus was assigned to Otto Kuntze. The 1987 edition of the International Code of Botanical Nomenclature changed the rules on the starting date and primary work for names of fungi, and names can now be considered valid as far back as 1 May 1753, the date of publication of Linnaeus's work.

Common names include Jersey cow mushroom, bovine bolete, and euro cow bolete. One proposed origin for the scientific name is that medieval knights—who revered Tricholoma equestre—considered this mushroom fit only for cattle-drovers as it was not highly valued. The mushroom's colour is similar to that of a Jersey cow.

A limited genetic sampling of species in a 1996 study by Annette Kretzer and colleagues showed Suillus bovinus was related to a lineage that diverged to S. punctipes, S. variegatus and S. tomentosus. A 2001 study found it was not closely related to other European species, and that all populations tested were closer to each other than any other and hence it was a cohesive species.

Czech mycologist Josef Šutara circumscribed the genus Mariaella in 1987, assigning Mariaella bovina as the type species. Mariaella contained Suillus species in section Fungosi. Molecular studies do not support the existence of Mariaella, and so it is considered synonymous with Suillus. Older synonyms for S. bovinus include those resulting from generic transfers to Agaricus by Jean-Baptiste Lamarck in 1783, and the now-obsolete Ixocomus by Lucien Quélet in 1888.

In 1951, Arthur Anselm Pearson described the variety Boletus bovinus var. viridocaerulescens, which was later transferred to Suillus by Rolf Singer in 1961. This variant, collected in Western Cape Province, South Africa, differs from the main form by the staining reaction of the cap flesh, which turns dark or light greenish-blue upon injury. Index Fungorum does not, however, recognize the variety as having independent taxonomic significance.

Chemical analysis of pigments and chromogens showed that Suillus was more closely related to Gomphidius and Rhizopogon than to other boletes, and hence Suillus bovinus and its allies were transferred from the Boletaceae to the newly circumscribed family Suillaceae in 1997. Molecular studies have reinforced how distantly related these fungi are from Boletus edulis and its allies.

== Description ==
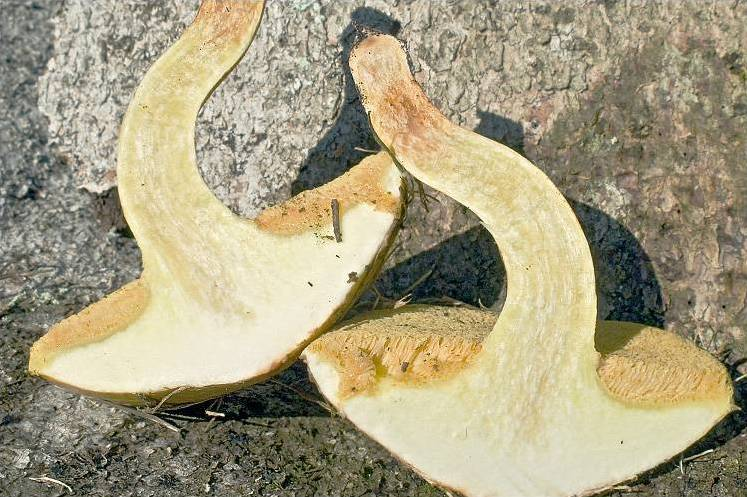
Bisected fruit body

The fruit body—colloquially called a mushroom—of Suillus bovinus is a basidiocarp which is smaller and daintier than most other boletes. The cap is initially convex, then flat with a wavy margin and a grey-yellow or ochre with pink tinge in some specimens. It ranges from 3–10 cm (1 1/4–4 in) in diameter and has a sticky skin. The flesh is whitish, yellowish or clay-coloured and has a fruity smell. Sometimes turning a pink tinge when bruised, the flesh is spongy and rubbery. Like other boletes, it has pores instead of gills that make up the hymenophore on the underside of the cap. Suillus bovinus has a characteristic compound pore layer, consisting of an outer layer of coarse, angular pores overlaying an inner layer of finer pores. The pores are grey- to olive-yellow and generally decurrent, comprising yellow to olive-yellow tubes that measure 0.3–1 cm (1/8–3/8 in) long. The stipe is 4–6 cm (1 1/2–2 1/4 in) tall, similar in colour to the cap, and tends to be narrower towards the base. With a diameter of 0.5–0.8 cm (1/4–3/8 in), it is more slender than those of other boletes.

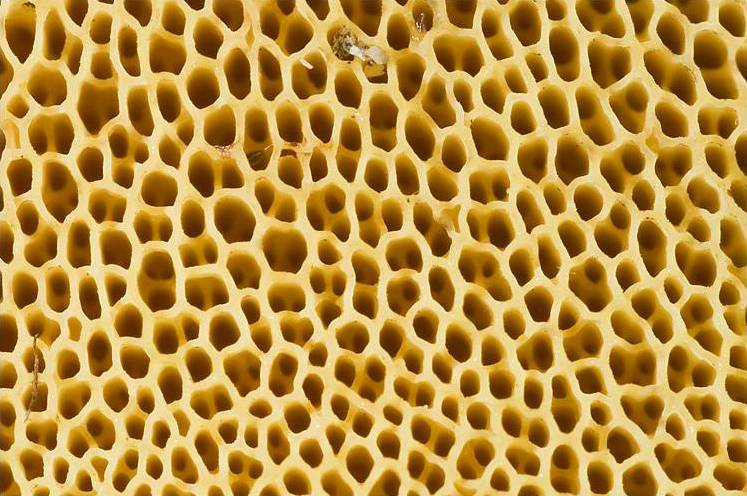
Closeup of pore surface

The spore print is an olive-brown colour. The oval to spindle-shaped spores have dimensions of 8–10 by 3.5–4.5 μm. Basidia (spore-bearing cells) are cylindrical to narrowly club-shaped, measuring 22.4–33.4 by 5.8–8.0 μm. They bear four sterigmata (each holding a single spore), which are up to 6.8 μm long. Cystidia are present on both the tube ends (cheilocystidia) and tube faces (pleurocystidia). There are no clamp connections in the hyphae of Suillus bovinus. The cap cuticle comprises filamentous, gelatinized hyphae with a diameter of 2.6–5.0 μm. The mycelium has a pink tinge.

The distinctive colour of the cap and pores make it hard to confuse with other species. Often found in similar habitats is S. variegatus, though this species has a granular cap and dark olive pores, which are smaller and not decurrent. It can also bruise blue.

== Distribution and habitat ==
Suillus bovinus is found in conifer woods and plantations across Europe, including subalpine regions in the Alps, up to altitudes of 800 m (2500 ft). It is common in Lithuania, where it associates with Scots pine (Pinus sylvestris), the only naturally occurring pine in that country. Preferred soils of S. bovinus are often acidic, sand-based, or sometimes calcareous (chalky) and moraine. In Asia, it has been recorded in Taiwan, and in Japan, where it associates with Japanese red pine (Pinus densiflora). In China, it has been recorded from provinces Anhui, Fujian, Guangdong, Hunan, Jiangxi, and Zhejiang.

Suillus bovinus has been introduced into other areas. In North America, where it is thought to have been introduced with Scots pine, it is found in the eastern United States, including North Carolina, Pennsylvania, Vermont, and the Adirondack Mountains of New York. It has been recorded infrequently under Scots pine in Australia, where it has been found as far north as southern Queensland, and in more southerly locations including New South Wales and Kuitpo Forest. It has been recorded in New Zealand. In South Africa, it grows with Pinus radiata.

== Ecology ==
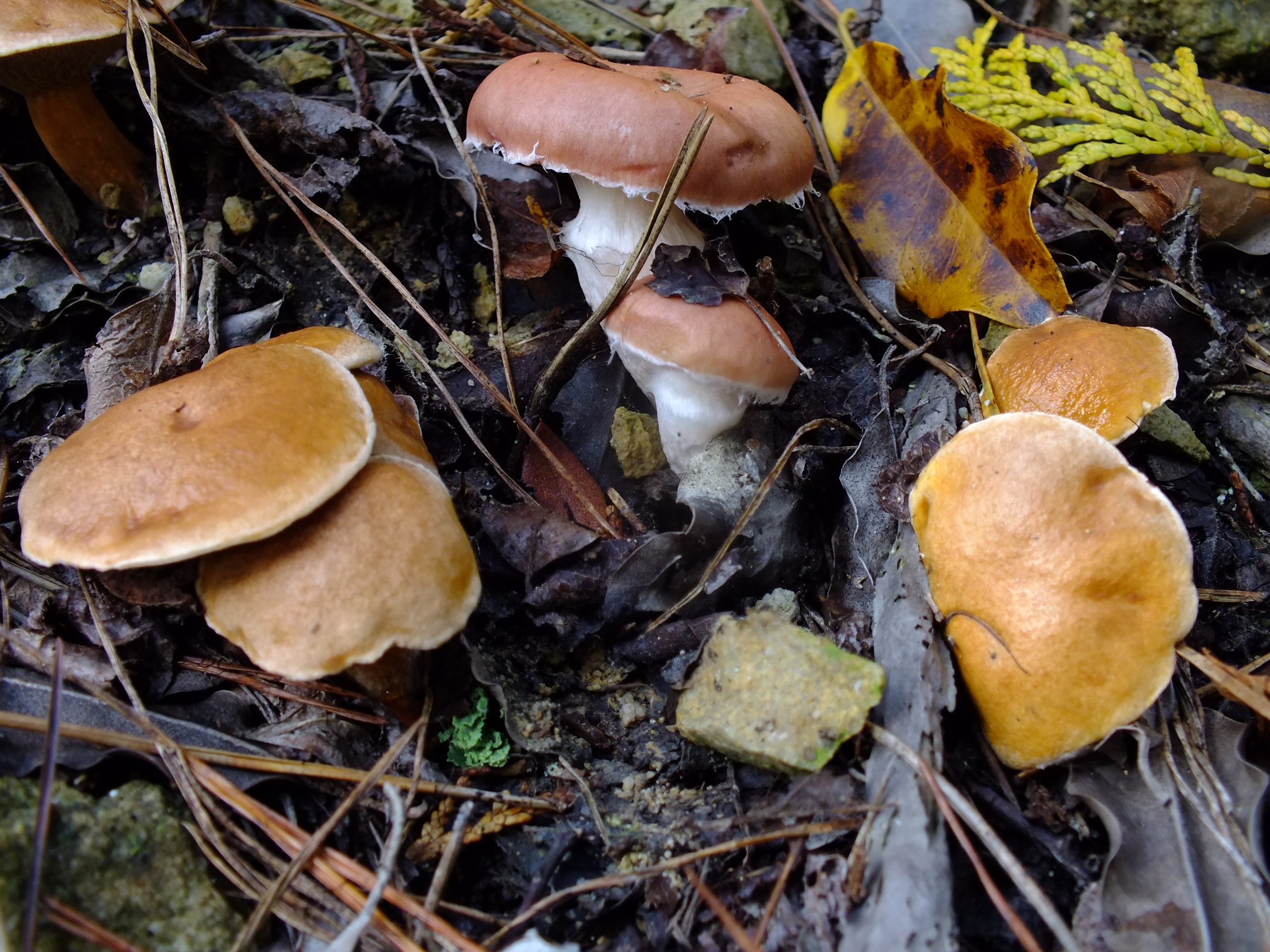
Gomphidius roseus growing alongside Suillus bovinus

Suillus bovinus is mycorrhizal, forming symbiotic associations with living trees by enveloping the tree's underground roots with sheaths of fungal tissue. Field work in pine forests in Sweden analysing the population structure of Suillus bovinus found that mushrooms were more abundant in younger forests and forests with disturbed areas, which contained a higher number of genets (colonies)—700 to 5700 per hectare—compared with 30 to 120 genets per hectare in mature stands. Older colonies in mature forests could be 17.5 m (57 1/2 ft) in diameter against 1.7–5.3 m (5 1/2–17 1/2 ft) diameter in young forests. Spore-bearing mushrooms (sporocarps) produce a huge number of spores (estimated in a Finnish study at 240 million to 1.2 billion per mushroom), of which only a small number grow successfully; this large number is thought to explain the larger numbers of colonies in disturbed and young forests, while the fungus' vegetative spread becomes more important in established forests. Colonies of S. bovinus do not overlap, which indicates they suppress each other's growth. The median lifespan of a colony was estimated to be 36 years. Field work conducted in Swedish pine forests suggested that S. variegatus suppressed the growth of S. bovinus, as there was a negative correlation in occurrence.

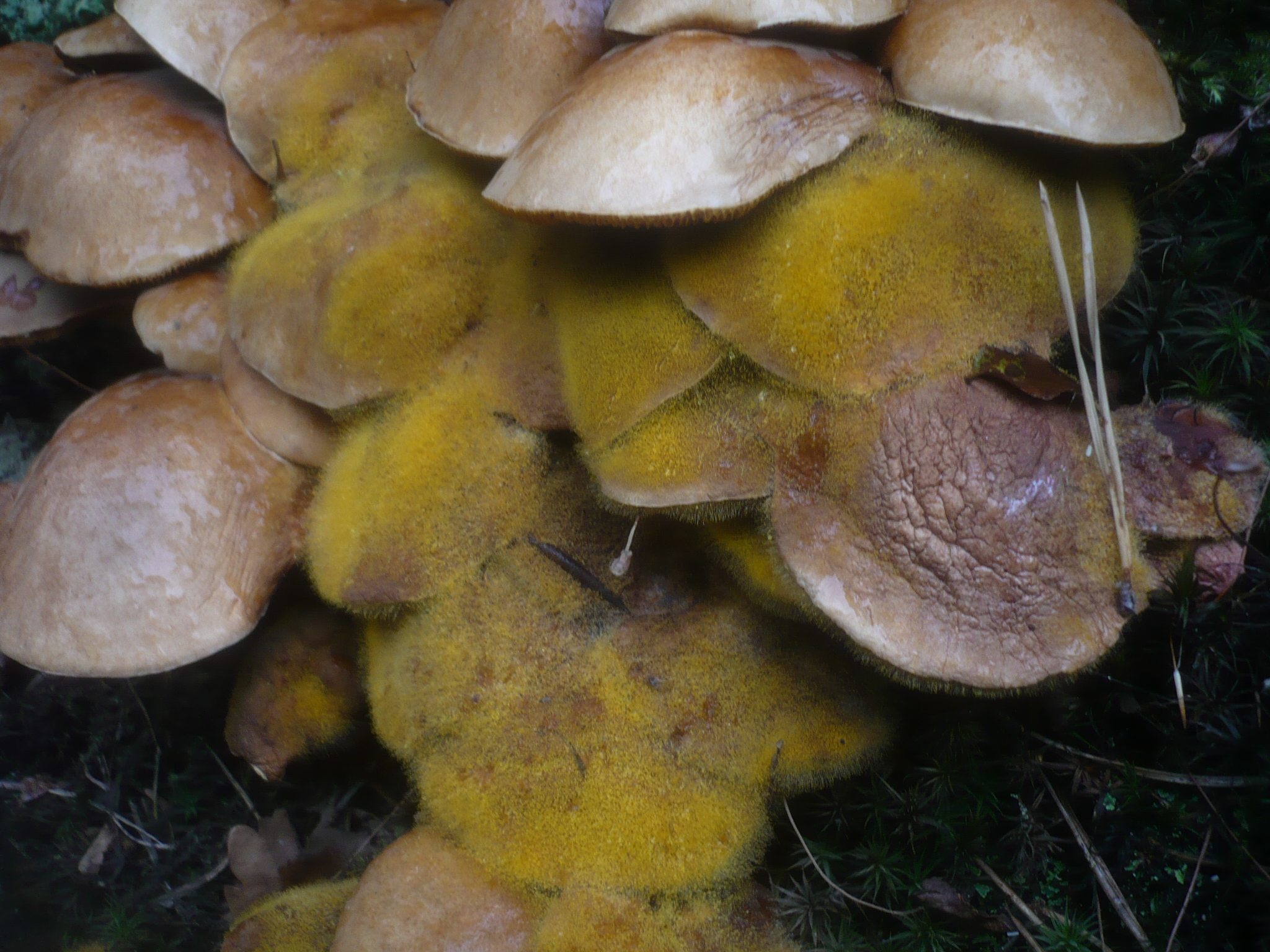
Suillus bovinus fruit bodies attacked by the yellow mould Dicranophora fulva

A Finnish study published in 1997 found that bacterial communities under P. sylvestris without mycorrhizae metabolised organic and amino acids, while communities among S. bovinus metabolised mannitol, a sugar alcohol. The mycelia also extended the environment in the soil that the bacteria were able to grow in. An experimental study in Portugal showed that Pinus pinaster trees grew better after being inoculated with mycelium from S. bovinus, Laccaria laccata and Lactarius deterrimus and spores of Pisolithus tinctorius and Scleroderma citrinum. These fungi were proposed as an alternative for chemical fertiliser in arboriculture of pine trees. Suillus bovinus has been shown to improve the tolerance of its host Pinus sylvestris to metal pollutants such as cadmium and zinc, though not to hazardous organic compounds such as m-toluate.

Experimental work in 1986 showed that Suillus bovinus could metabolise proteins and peptides directly, causing a drop in nitrogen in growth media, which suggested the species has some saprophytic activity.

The related rosy spike-cap (Gomphidius roseus) is found exclusively with this species, and is now thought to be parasitic upon the mycelium of Suillus bovinus. This is evidenced by microscopic examination, which shows that G. roseus inserts haustoria in plant root cells and does not produce significant mycelium itself. Furthermore, G. roseus is never found growing in isolation, only with S. bovinus though the latter species is found without the former. Dicranophora fulva is a yellow mould that has been found growing on decaying S. bovinus fruit bodies in Europe and the United States.

== Edibility ==
Suillus bovinus tastes mild and is edible, although it is not highly regarded. When cooked, it releases a lot of fluid, which can be collected and reduced or strained to make a sauce. Its flavour is made more intense by drying. The soft and rubbery consistency of older specimens—as well as their proneness to maggot infestation—renders them almost inedible. Fruit bodies are part of the later summer diet of the red squirrel in Eurasia, which collects the mushrooms and stores them in tree forks for a ready food supply after the onset of frost. There are several fly species that often use S. bovinus fruit bodies to rear their young, including Bolitophila rossica, Exechia separata, Exechiopsis indecisa, Pegomya deprimata, and Pegohylemyia silvatica.
