= Joseph Schröter =

German mycologist, doctor and scientist (1837–1894)

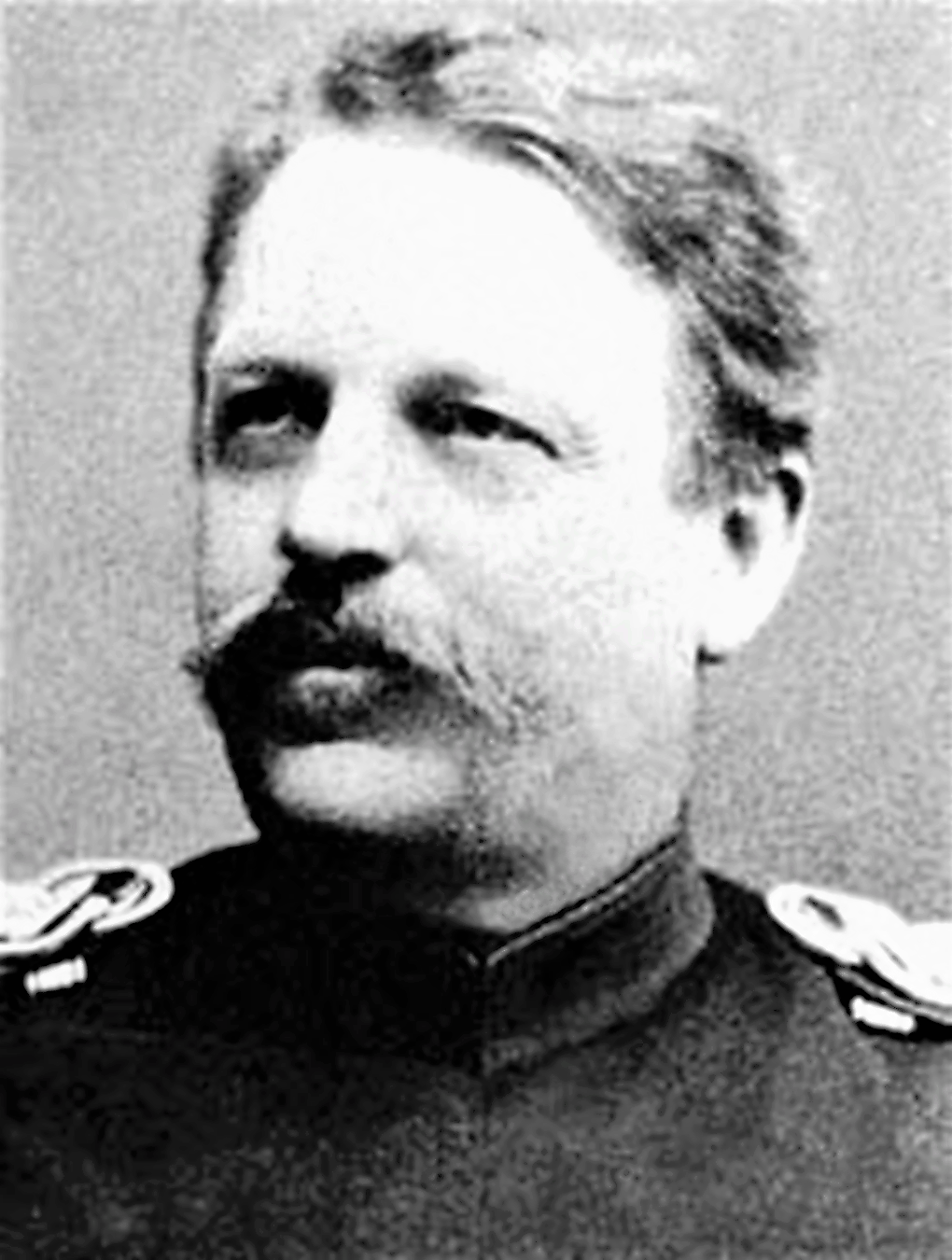
Joseph Schröter (1837-1894), physiotherapist and mycologist as a military doctor

Joseph Schröter (14 March 1837 – 12 December 1894) was a German mycologist and medical doctor. He wrote several books and texts, and discovered and described many species of flora and fungi. He also spent around fifteen years, from 1871 to 1886, as a military doctor, particularly in the Franco-Prussian War, in places such as Spandau, Rastatt and Breslau, and rising to the rank of colonel.

== Life ==
In 1855 Schröter chose to study medicine in Breslau, Lower Silesia (Wrocław, Poland since 1945), but in 1856, he transferred to the Friedrich-Wilhelm Academy in Berlin, Prussia (Germany did not unite into a single nation state until 1871). In 1859 he earned his Doctor of Medicine degree. In the same year, he enlisted in the Prussian army, serving as a doctor in the Franco-Prussian War. He occupied this post to the end of the war, in 1871, before being stationed at Spandau, and later Rastatt. For his efforts as a doctor, as well as the various other contributions he made to the military (particularly during the Franco-Prussian War), Schröter was promoted to the rank of colonel in 1880. He was then stationed at Breslau, where he had been schooled.

Six years later, he began a career at the University of Breslau, in 1886, when he was appointed as a lecturer. He stayed at the university teaching for several years, and became a professor in 1890. Schröter distributed the exsiccata Pilze Schlesiens. He died in 1894, after returning from a scientific expedition to Turkey.

== Genera described by Schröter ==
Schröter described many genera, including:

- Aleurodiscus
- Ceratiomyxa
- Clavulina
- Daedaleopsis
- Dicranophora
- Hygrophoropsis
- Plasmopara
- Sclerospora
- Sorosphaera
- Synchephalastrum

== See also ==
- List of mycologists
- Category:Taxa named by Joseph Schröter
