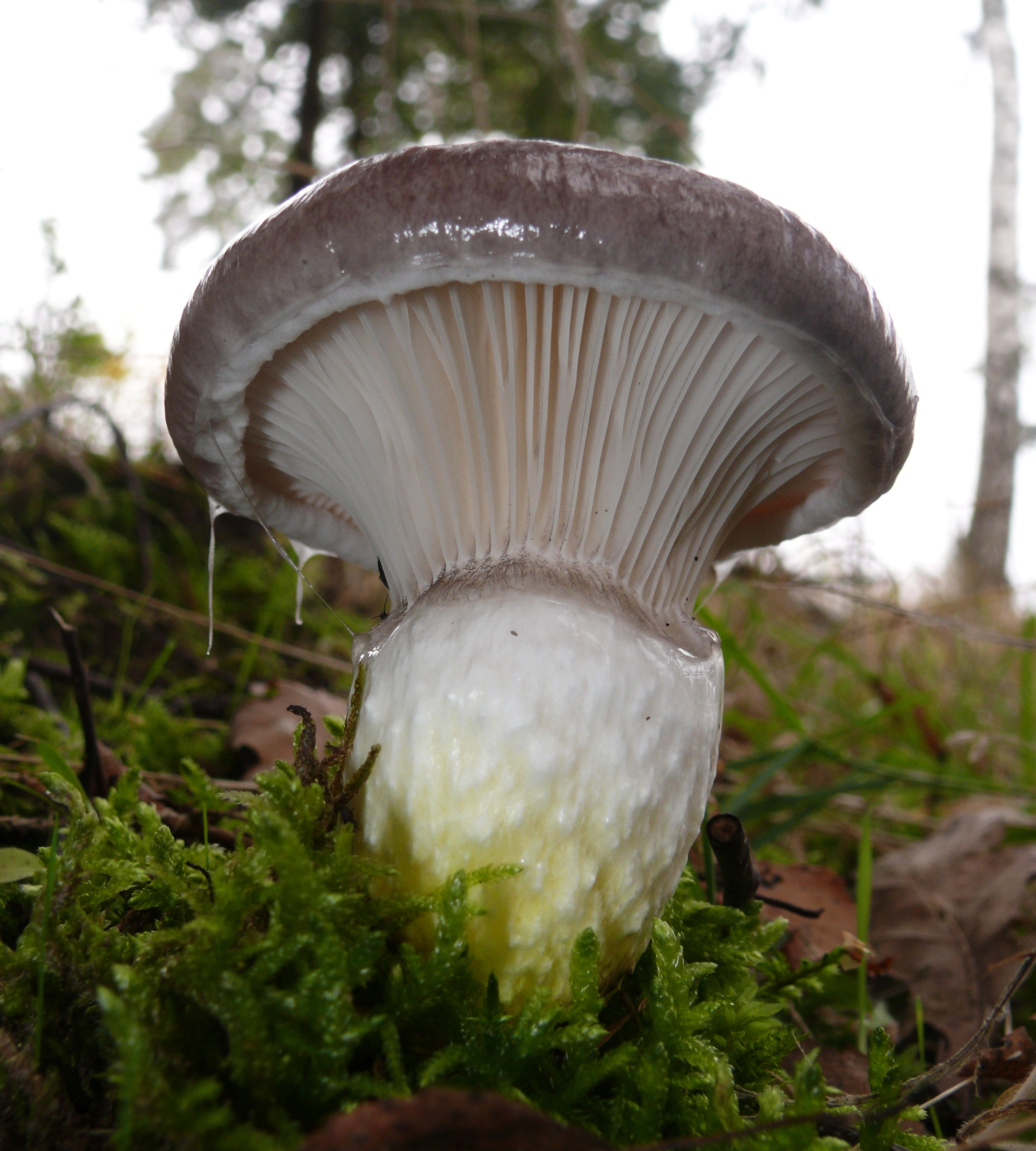
- Gomphidius glutinosus

Scientific classification
- Kingdom: Fungi
- Division: Basidiomycota
- Class: Agaricomycetes
- Order: Boletales
- Family: Gomphidiaceae; Maire ex Jülich (1982)

Type genus
- Gomphidius Fr. (1836)

Genera
- Brauniellula A.H. Sm. & Singer 1959; Chroogomphus (Singer) O.K. Mill. (1964); Cystogomphus Singer 1942; Gomphidius Fr. 1836; Gomphogaster O.K. Mill. 1973

= Gomphidiaceae =

Family of fungi

The Gomphidiaceae are a family of mushroom-forming fungi in the order Boletales. Unlike other boletes, all members of Gomphidiaceae (except for Gomphogaster) are agarics, having gills instead of pores. Member genera include Chroogomphus, Cystogomphus, Gomphidius and Gomphogaster, the last being a monotypic genus (i.e. with a single species) that may be incorporated into Gomphidius in the future after molecular assessment. The similarly named genus Gomphus is unrelated to this family. Another genus Brauniellula has since been sunk into Chroogomphus.

Like all agarics, this group was formerly classified in Agaricales. Nonetheless, many of the microscopic features of these fungi, such as spore shape, strongly suggested an affinity with Boletales. This was later confirmed through molecular phylogenetic investigation, which demonstrated that Gomphidiaceae are more closely related to boletes than the "true" agarics of the Agaricales and that the development of gills in this group was an independent evolutionary event from the development of gills in the Agaricales. Molecular phylogenetic investigations have also demonstrated Gomphidiaceae are nested well within Boletales, being more closely related to Suillaceae than to Boletaceae, a finding that is supported by chemotaxonomic investigation of these groups.

This family of fungi has been thought to be ectomycorrhizal, forming symbiotic relationship with their host trees, however, there is now evidence that many (and perhaps all) species in this group are parasitic upon ectomycorrhizal boletes, in relationships that are often highly species-specific.
