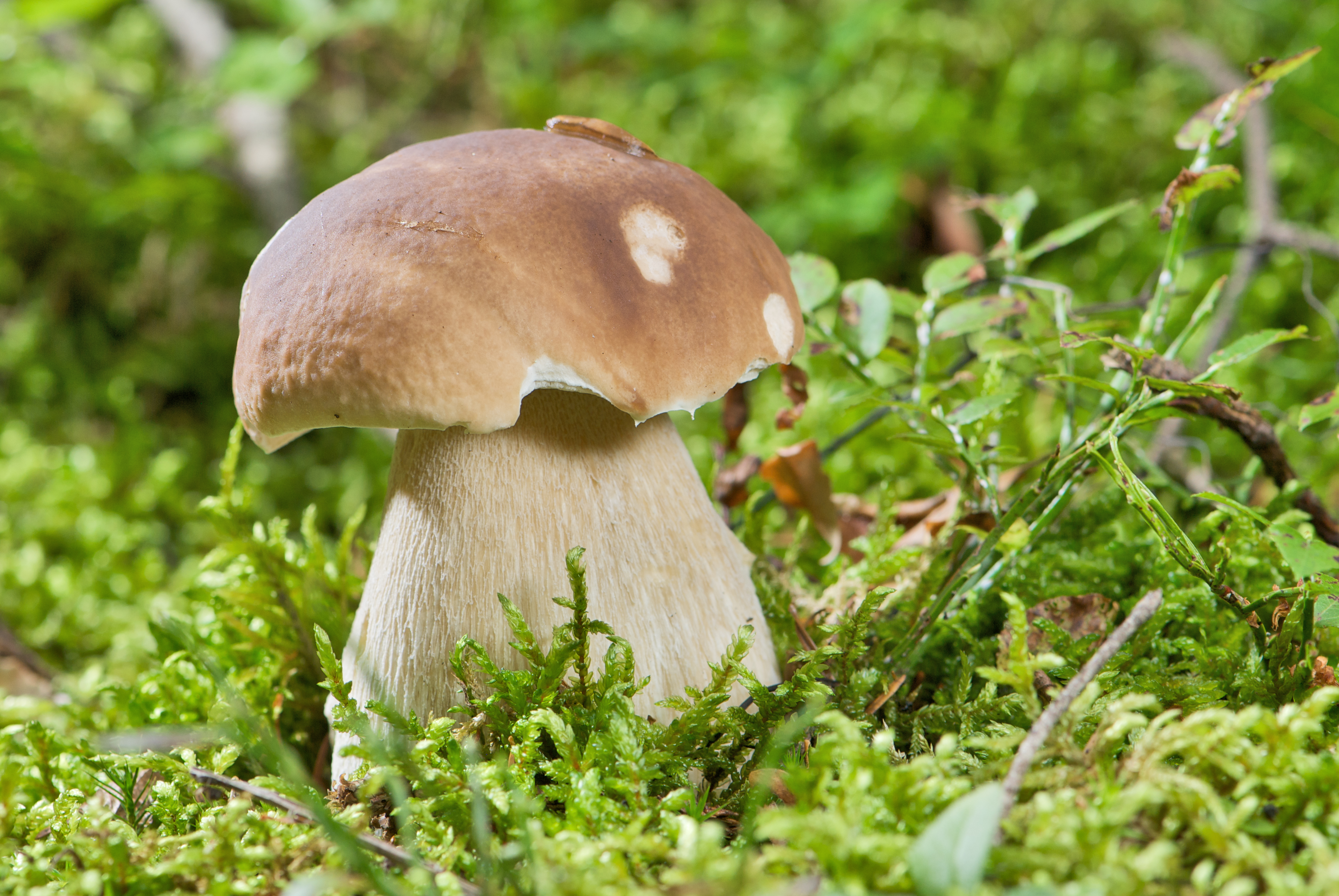
- Boletus edulis

Scientific classification
- Kingdom: Fungi
- Division: Basidiomycota
- Class: Agaricomycetes
- Subclass: Agaricomycetidae
- Order: Boletales; E.-J.Gilbert (1931)

Families
- Boletaceae Boletinellaceae Coniophoraceae Diplocystaceae Gasterellaceae Gomphidiaceae Gyroporaceae Hygrophoropsidaceae Paxillaceae Protogastraceae Rhizopogonaceae Sclerodermataceae Serpulaceae Suillaceae Tapinellaceae

= Boletales =

Order of fungi

The Boletales are an order of Agaricomycetes containing over 1300 species with a diverse array of fruiting body types. The boletes are the best known members of this group, and until recently, the Boletales were thought to only contain boletes. The Boletales are now known to contain distinct groups of agarics, puffballs, and other fruiting-body types.

== Taxonomy ==
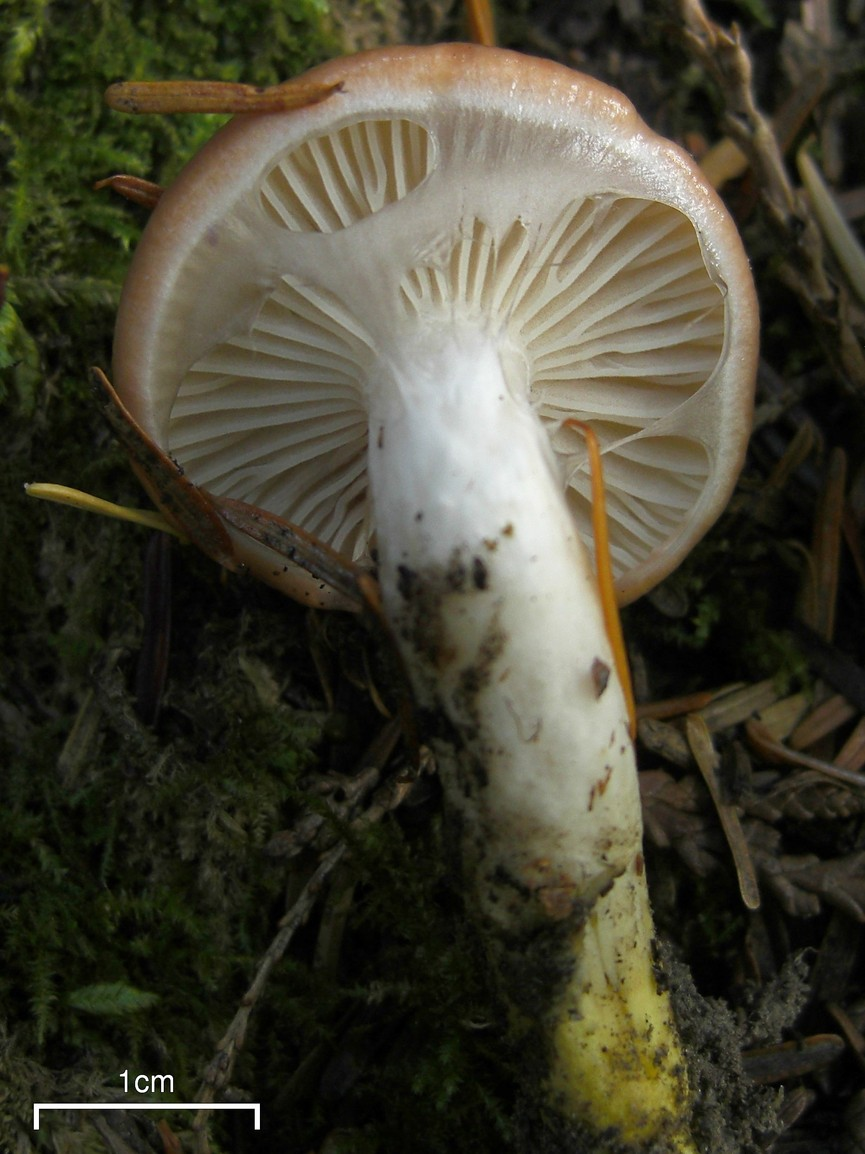
Gomphidius subroseus, family Gomphidiaceae

The order Boletales originally was created to describe boletes, but based on micromorphological and molecular phylogenetic characteristics, a large number of nonbolete species have recently been reclassified to belong to this group, as well. The order also includes some gilled mushrooms, in the families Gomphidiaceae, Serpulaceae, Tapinellaceae, Hygrophoropsidaceae, and Paxillaceae, which often have the same flesh texture as the boletes, spore-bearing tissue which is also easily separable from the cap, and similar microscopic characteristics of spores and cystidia. Taxonomic studies using secondary metabolites and later molecular phylogenetic evidence moved several physically dissimilar groups into Boletales, including the Sclerodermataceae (earthballs) and the Rhizopogonaceae (false truffles).

Phylogenetic analyses shows the Sclerodermataceae, Boletinellaceae and Gyroporaceae appear to form a discrete group within the Boletales, and together with the Pisolithaceae, and the Astraceae, are grouped under the suborder Sclerodermatineae. Thus, the boletes of Boletinellus and Phlebopus are more closely related to earthballs of Scleroderma than to Boletus. Similarly, the bolete genus Suillus is more closely related to the agarics and false truffles of Chroogomphus, Gomphidius, and Rhizopogon than to Boletus.

In some older classification systems, a part of the family Boletaceae was separated to form the family Strobilomycetaceae. However, more recent molecular genetics studies have found it to be an unnatural grouping. According to the 2008 (10th) edition of the Dictionary of the Fungi, the Boletales comprise 17 families, 96 genera, and 1316 species.

== Ecology ==
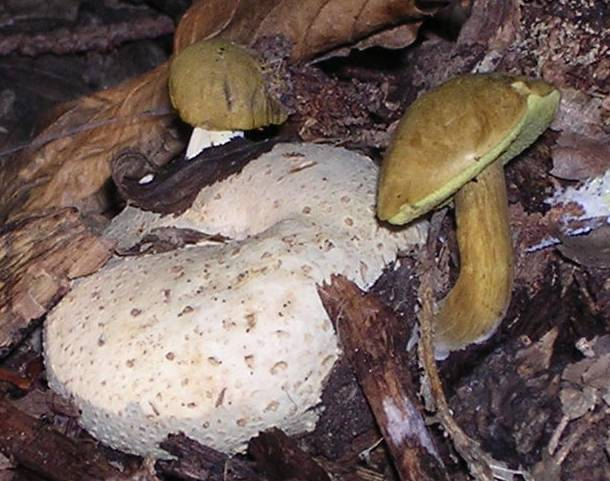
Pseudoboletus parasiticus on Scleroderma citrinum

The Boletales are largely ectomycorrhizal fungi, hence are found mainly in or near woodlands. Certain species are parasitic rather than ectomycorrhizal. Members of the family Gomphidiaceae are thought to be parasitic upon members of the family Suillaceae; these relationships are often highly species-specific. Other parasitic boletes included Pseudoboletus parasiticus which grows on Scleroderma citrinum. A few species are saprophytic and lignicolous, like those in the genus Buchwaldoboletus.

== Edibility and identification ==
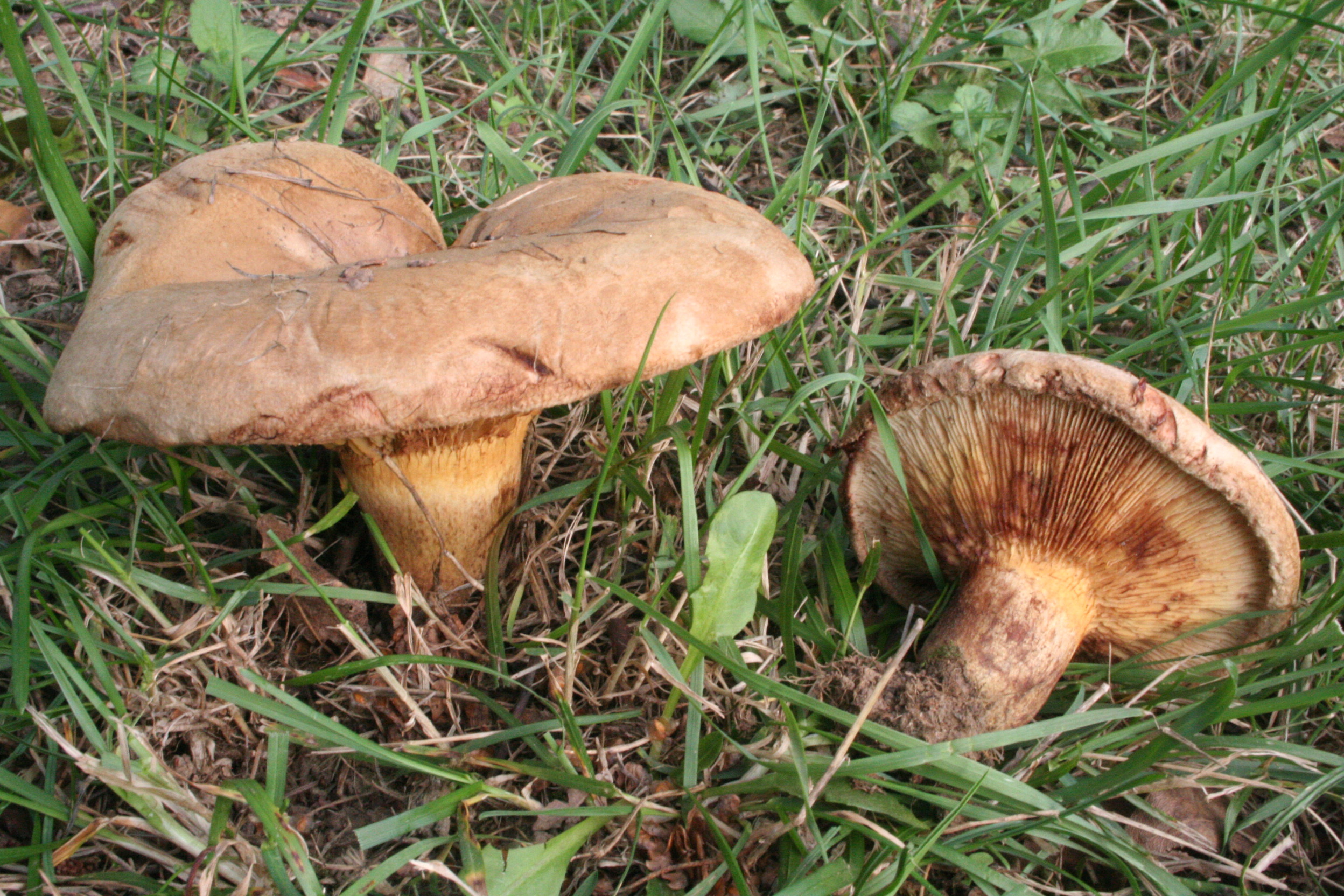
Paxillus involutus, family Paxillaceae

Boletes are usually identified by having a sponge-like surface under the cap, instead of the usual gills. They occur in a variety of colours, such as red, white, brown and gray. Many of the inedible boletes are either white or red, and these should be avoided during picking.

The genus Boletus contains many edible species, most notably, B. edulis, including B. aereus and B. pinophilus, though many others are eaten, as well, such as B. badius. B. edulis and its relatives are of great commercial importance in Europe and North America. Species of Suillus are considered by many to be slimy and insipid; in Russia, though, they are often pickled and even sold commercially this way. In North America, S. pungens, known also as the "slippery jack," is said by some to be delicious cooked, provided the slimy coat of its cap is removed beforehand. Many boletes, while not toxic, are nonetheless bitter-tasting and inedible.

The Paxillaceae contain a number of species that have been implicated in fatal poisonings. A few boletes are also highly toxic (though generally not deadly), notably the fairly conspicuous Boletus satanas and allies. Still, many mushroom hunters recommend that beginners start with boletes, since deadly mix-ups are far less likely than with agarics.

== Genera incertae sedis ==
There are several genera classified in the Boletales that are i) poorly known, ii) have not been subjected to DNA analysis, or iii) if analysed phylogenetically do not group with as yet named or identified families, and have not been assigned to a specific family (i.e., incertae sedis with respect to familial placement). These include:

- Corditubera
- Corneromyces
- Marthanella
- Phaeoradulum

== See also ==
- Bolete eater
- List of Boletus species
