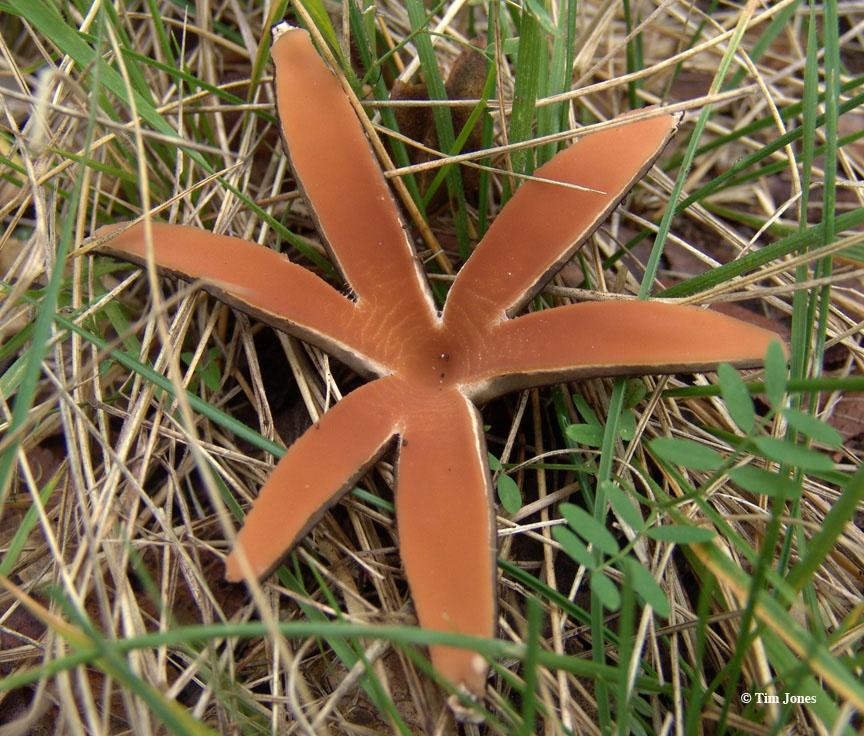
- Chorioactis geaster

Scientific classification
- Kingdom: Fungi
- Division: Ascomycota
- Class: Pezizomycetes
- Order: Pezizales
- Family: Chorioactidaceae
- Genus: Chorioactis; Kupfer ex Eckblad (1968)
- Species: C. geaster

Binomial name
- Chorioactis geaster (Peck) Kupfer ex Eckblad (1968)
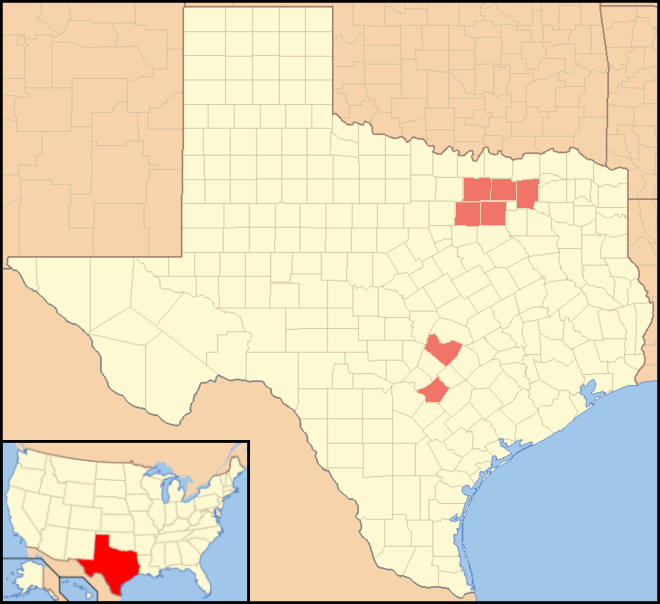
- Distribution in Texas (above), and Japan (below) shown in red and dark green, respectively.
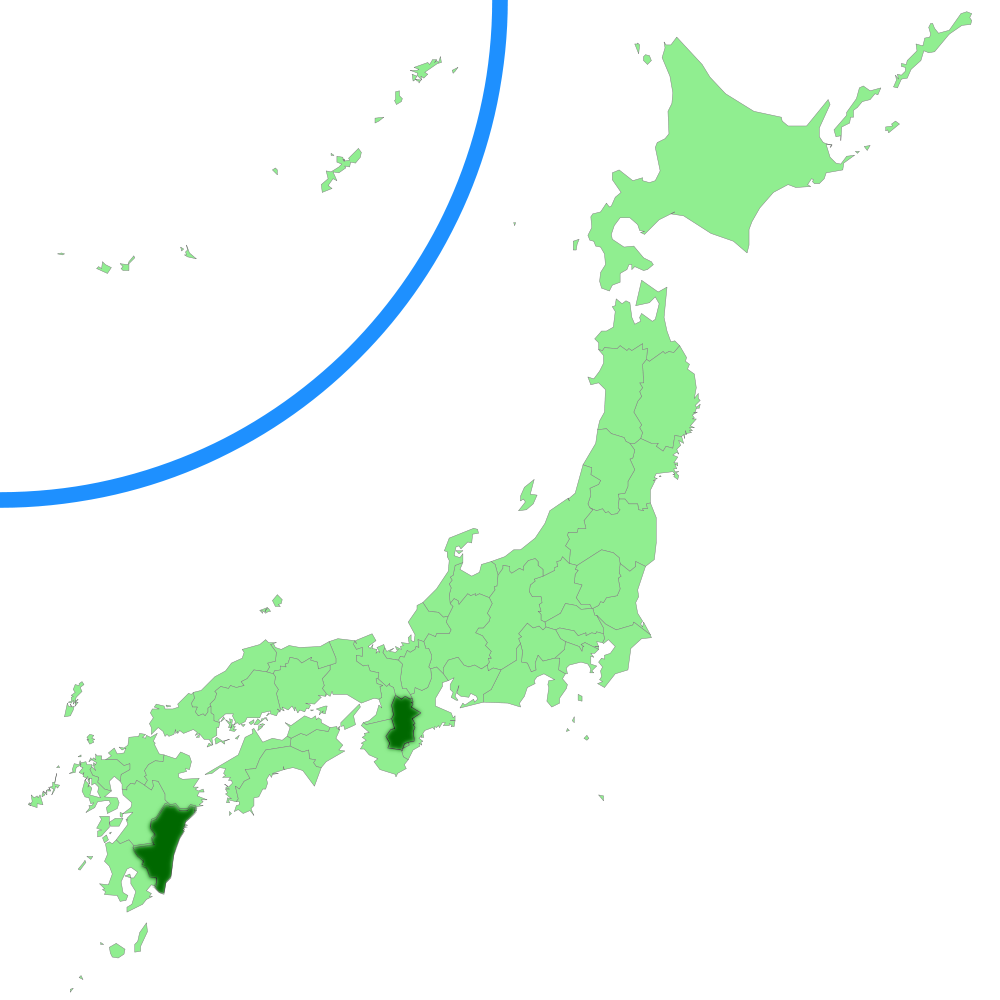

Synonyms
- Urnula geaster Peck (1893); Chorioactis geaster (Peck) Kupfer (1902)

= Chorioactis =

Genus of fungi

Chorioactis is a genus of fungi that contains the single species Chorioactis geaster. The mushroom is commonly known as the devil's cigar or the Texas star in the United States, while in Japan it is called kirinomitake (キリノミタケ). This extremely rare mushroom is notable for its unusual appearance and disjunct distribution; it is found only in select locales in Texas, Oklahoma, Japan, and Taiwan. The fruit body, which grows on the stumps or dead roots of cedar elms (in Texas) or dead oaks (in Japan), somewhat resembles a dark brown or black cigar before it splits open radially into a starlike arrangement of four to seven leathery rays. The interior surface of the fruit body bears the spore-bearing tissue known as the hymenium, and is colored white to brown, depending on its age. The fruit body opening can be accompanied by a distinct hissing sound and the release of a smoky cloud of spores.

Fruit bodies were first collected in Austin, Texas, and the species was named Urnula geaster in 1893; later, it was found in Kyushu in 1937, but the mushroom was not reported again in Japan until 1973. Although the new genus Chorioactis was proposed to accommodate the unique species a few years after its original discovery, it was not accepted as a valid genus until 1968. Its classification has also been a source of confusion. Historically, Chorioactis was placed in the fungus family Sarcosomataceae, despite inconsistencies in the microscopic structure of the ascus, the saclike structure in which spores are formed. Phylogenetic analyses of the past decade have clarified the fungus's classification: Chorioactis, along with three other genera, make up the family Chorioactidaceae, a grouping of related fungi formally acknowledged in 2008. In 2009, Japanese researchers reported discovering a form of the fungus missing the sexual stage of its lifecycle; this asexual state was named Kumanasamuha geaster.

== History ==
The fungus was first collected in 1893 by botanist Lucien Marcus Underwood, who sent the specimens to mycologist Charles Horton Peck for identification. Peck described the species as Urnula geaster in that year's Annual Report of the New York State Botanist, although he expressed doubt about its generic placement in Urnula. In 1902, student mycologist Elsie Kupfer questioned the proposed classification of various species in the genera Urnula and Geopyxis, as suggested in an 1896 publication on the Discomycetes by German mycologist Heinrich Rehm. She considered Rehm's transfer of the species to the genus Geopyxis illogical:

""Even externally, the fungus does not closely match Rehm's own description of the genus Geopyxis under which he places it. The texture of the apothecium is described as fleshy, the stem as short and sometimes thin, while in this plant, the leathery character of the cup and the length and thickness of the stem are its most noticeable features."

Working with Underwood's guidance, Kupfer compared the microscopic structure of the hymenium (the fertile, spore-bearing tissue) of the Texan species with a number of similar ones—Geopyxis carbonaria, Urnula craterium, and Urnula terrestris (now known as Podophacidium xanthomelum). She concluded that the Texan species was so dissimilar as to warrant its own genus, which she named Chorioactis. Although this taxonomical change was opposed in later studies of the fungus by Frederick De Forest Heald and Frederick Adolf Wolf (1910) and Fred Jay Seaver (1928, 1942), Chorioactis was established as a valid genus in 1968 by Finn-Egil Eckblad in his comprehensive monograph about the Discomycetes.

== Classification and naming ==
Historically, Chorioactis was considered to be in the family Sarcosomataceae. A 1983 monograph on the family included Chorioactis in the tribe Sarcosomateae (along with the genera Desmazierella, Sarcosoma, Korfiella, Plectania, and Urnula), a grouping of fungi characterized by having spores lacking small, wart-like projections (verruculae) capable of absorbing blue dye. A 1994 study of the structural features of the asci and the ascospores concluded that Chorioactis was more closely aligned with the Sarcoscyphaceae, although it conceded that the layering of the cells comprising the walls of the ascus differed considerably from the other members of the family. It was not until 1999 that the results of phylogenetic analysis firmly challenged the traditional classification, showing C. geaster to be part of a distinct lineage, or clade, that includes species in the genera Desmazierella, Neournula, and Wolfina, taxa that were distributed among both families. This analysis was later corroborated when it was shown that the grouping of these four genera (by then called the "Chorioactis clade") represented a sister clade to the Sarcosomataceae, and a new family, the Chorioactidaceae, was erected to contain them. Although C. geaster shares some characteristics with the other Chorioactidaceae genera, including dark-colored superficial "hairs" on the outer surface of the fruit bodies, it is distinguished from them by its tan to orange (rather than black) hymenia.

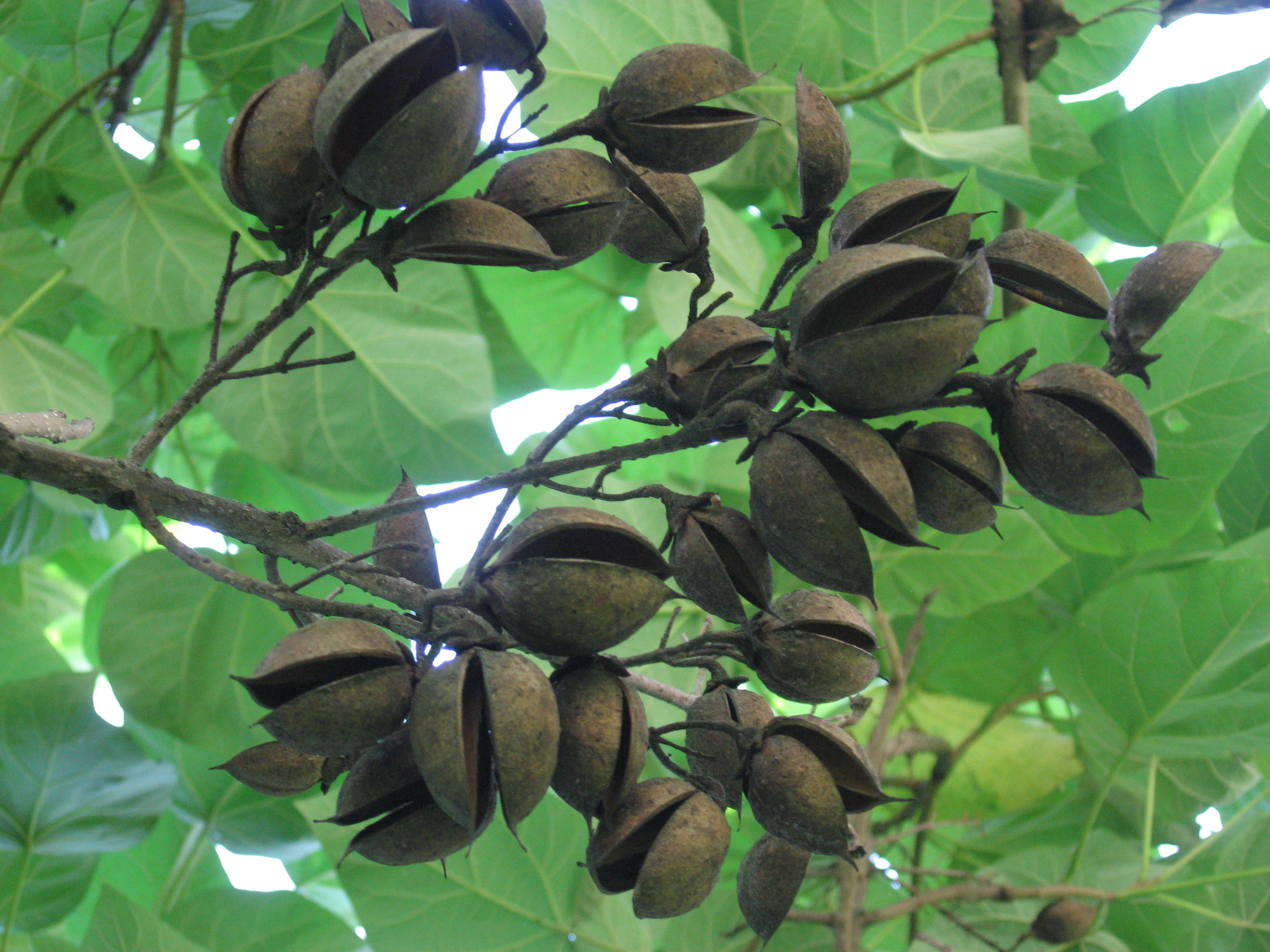
Spent seed pods of kiri, the empress tree

The specific epithet geaster alludes to members of genus Geastrum, which also open to form star-shaped fruit bodies commonly called 'earthstars'. In the United States, Chorioactis geaster is commonly known as the Texas star, or the devil's cigar. Regarding the origin of the latter name American mycologist Fred Jay Seaver commented: "Whether the name Devil's Cigar refers to the form of the young specimens which resemble a bloated cigar in form, as well as in color, or to the fact that the fungus appears to 'smoke' at maturity, we cannot say ... At any rate, the name is very appropriate."

In 1997, Texas State Senator Chris Harris filed a bill to make C. geaster the official state fungus of Texas. The bill passed the Senate but did not succeed in the House. The Texas Legislature finally designated the Texas star as the official "State Mushroom of Texas" in 2021.

In Japan the mushroom is called kirinomitake (キリノミタケ), because the immature, unopened fruit body bears a superficial resemblance to the seed pods of kiri, the empress tree (Paulownia tomentosa).

== Description ==
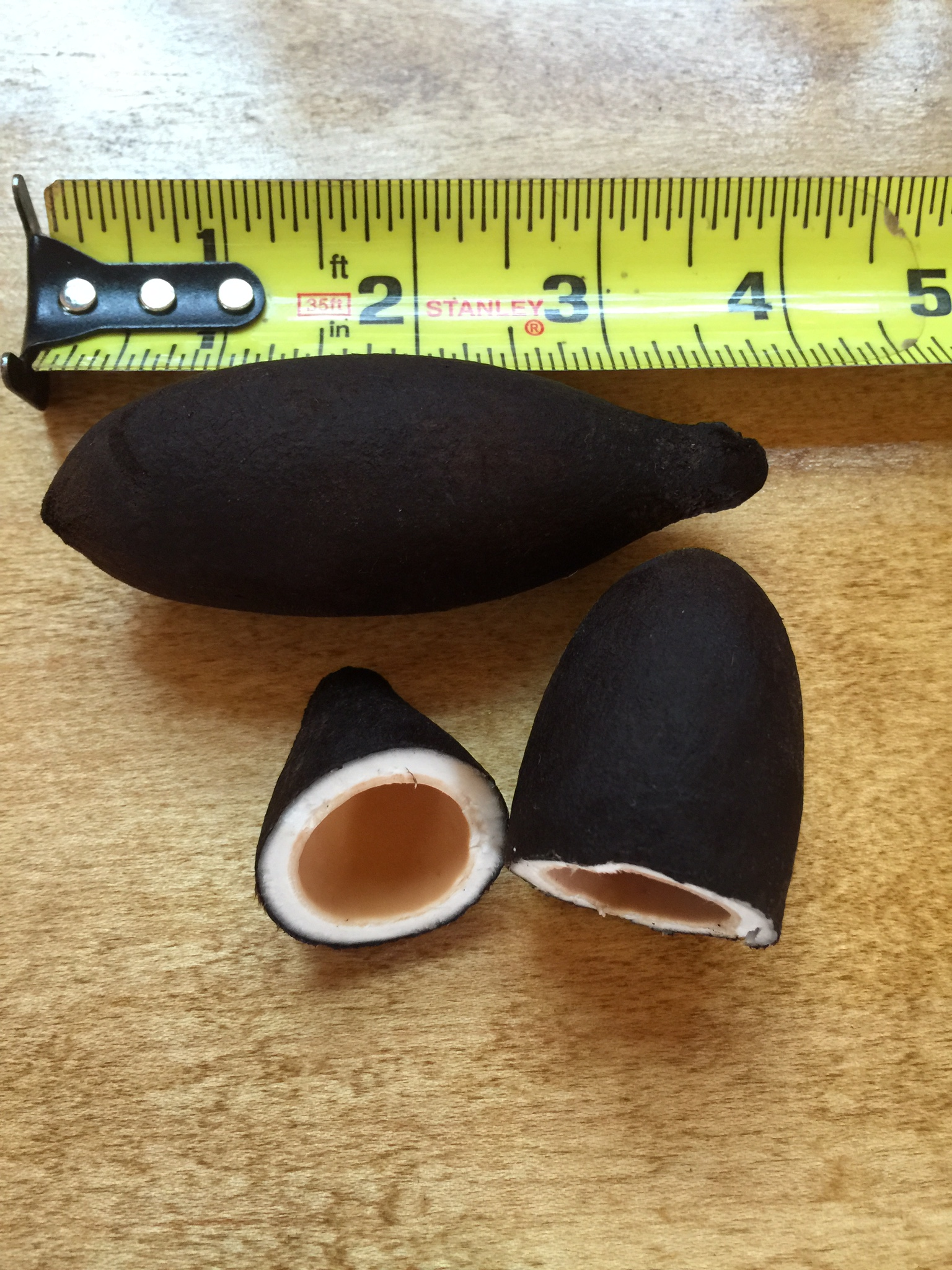
A closed immature fruiting body, and a specimen cut open to reveal the spore-bearing surface (hymenium)

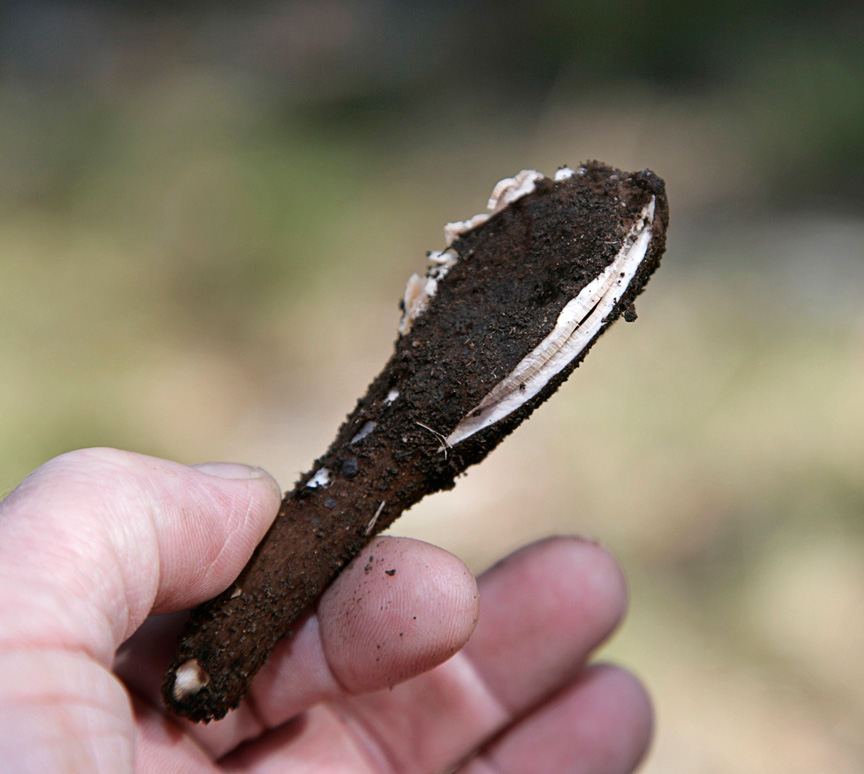
A specimen shortly after dehiscence, but before splitting into recurved rays

Young specimens of C. geaster have a hollow, club-shaped, dark-brown fruit body, connected to a stem. The stem, which is usually buried in the ground, is shorter than the hollow fruit body or equals it in length, although the stem length is somewhat variable depending on the depth of the underground root to which it is attached. The flesh of the stem and the wall of the fruit body are white, while the inner surface is yellowish-white, turning light brown with age. The fruit body varies in width from 1.2 to 3.5 cm (0.5 to 1.4 in) in the thickest portion, and has a length of 4 to 12 cm (1.6 to 4.7 in); the stem is 0.75 to 1.5 cm (0.3 to 0.6 in) wide by 1 to 5 cm (0.4 to 2.0 in) long. Both stem and fruit body are covered by a dense layer of soft, brown, velvety "hairs", or tomentum. In maturity, the fruit body splits open into four to seven rays that curve downward, similar to mushrooms of the genus Geastrum. The spores are borne on the inner surface of the rays, which, depending on the maturity of the specimen, may range in color from whitish to saffron to salmon to butterscotch to chestnut. The leathery rays are up to 0.35 cm (0.1 in) thick.

The fruit body remains closed until shortly before spore discharge; dehiscence (fruit body opening) is caused by the pressure exerted by swollen paraphyses—sterile (i.e., nonreproductive) cells that are interspersed between the ascospores. Dehiscence is accompanied by the release of clouds of spores, resembling smoke. The spore puffing upon rupture is thought to be caused by the sudden change in relative humidity between the interior chamber of the fruit body and the outside environment. Dehiscence is accompanied by a hissing sound, an auditory phenomenon known to occur in about 15 other fungal species.

=== Microscopic characteristics ===
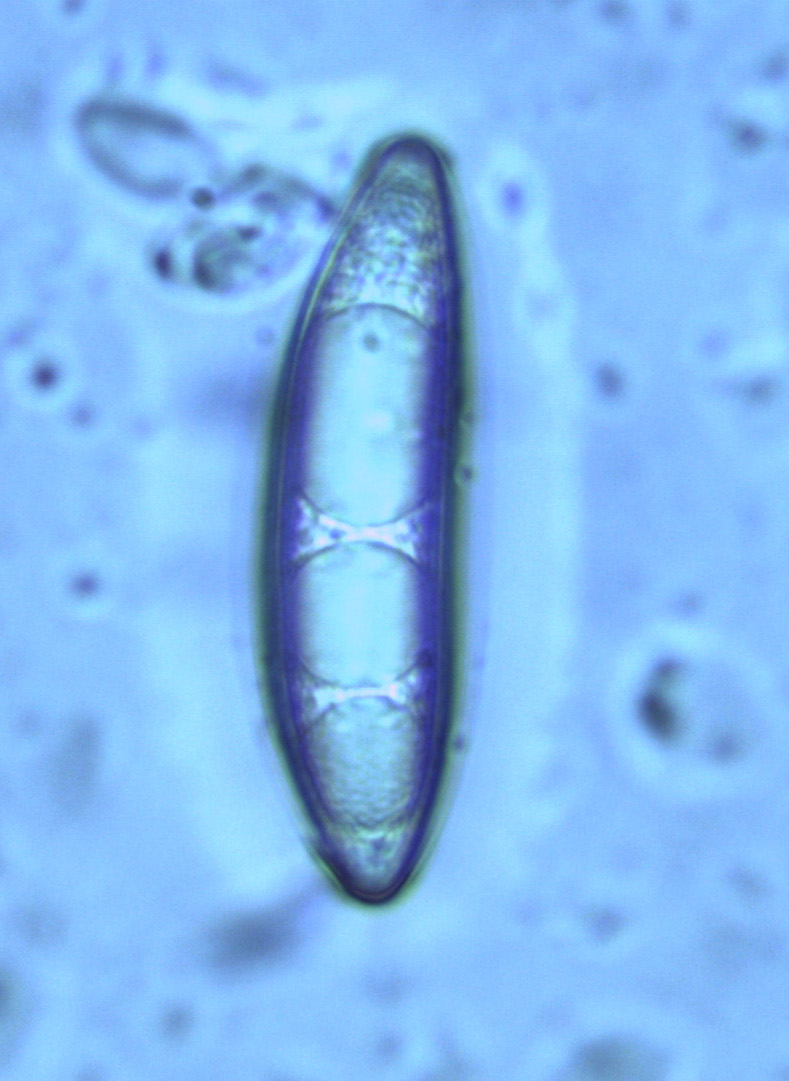
Spores are oblong or spindle-shaped, and contain three to five oil droplets.

Spores are oblong to spindle-shaped, and are flattened on one side; they have dimensions of 54–68 μm by 10–13 μm. The spores each contain three to five oil drops. Although the spores have been described as smooth in older literature, when viewed with transmission electron microscopy, they are seen to have minute spots or punctures. The spores develop simultaneously (synchronously) within the ascus, a developmental feature shared with the Sarcoscyphaceae genera Cookeina and Microstoma. Like other members of the Pezizales order, the asci of C. geaster have an operculum—a "lid"—that opens when the spores are discharged. However, the operculum of C. geaster develops a two-layered ring zone upon dehiscence, making it structurally distinct from members of both the Sarcosomataceae and the Sarcoscyphaceae families.

Similar to other Discomycetes, the fruit body consists of three distinct layers of tissue: the hymenium, the hypothecium, and the excipulum. The spore-bearing hymenium, the outermost layer of cells, contains asci interspersed with sterile cells called paraphyses. In C. geaster, the club-shaped asci are 700–800 μm long and 14–17.25 μm thick; they are abruptly constricted at the base to a narrow pedicel. The paraphyses are initially filamentous or thread-like (filiform) but swell with age to resemble a string of beads (moniliform). The swelling of the paraphyses is believed to cause the expansion of the hymenium and subsequent splitting of the fruit body into rays; this development places the asci into an optimal position for spore release and dispersal. Supporting the cells of the hymenium is a thin layer of tightly interwoven hyphae called the hypothecium, and underneath this is a thick layer of loosely interwoven hyphae known as the excipulum. This tissue layer, analogous to parenchyma found in plants, gives the tissue a fibrous texture. The excipulum layer averages 34 μm in diameter, while the hypothecium is 10–14 μm. When viewed with electron microscopy, the dark brown "hairs" on the surface of the fruit body can be seen to be adorned with conical warts or spines.

=== Anamorph form ===
Many fungi have an asexual stage in their lifecycle, in which they propagate via asexual spores called conidia. In some cases, the sexual stage—or teleomorph stage—is later identified, and a teleomorph-anamorph relationship is established between the species. In 2004, researchers reported a connection between C. geaster and the appearance of blackish-brown tufted structures on rotting wood. By comparing the internal transcribed spacer region of the nuclear ribosomal DNA from the two organisms, they established a phylogenetic connection between Chorioactis and the fungus they called Conoplea aff. elegantula. However, they were unable to induce the new organism to grow on artificial media, and did not definitively establish a teleomorph-anamorph connection between the fungi. In 2009, Japanese researchers found a similar fungus growing on rotting logs that were normally associated with the growth of C. geaster; they were able to grow the organism in axenic cultures from single-spore isolates of C. geaster. Until the one fungus, one name rule was enacted in 2011, the International Code of Botanical Nomenclature permitted the recognition of two (or more) names for one and the same organism, one based on the teleomorph, the other(s) restricted to the anamorph(s). So Nagao et al. named the anamorph Kumanasamuha geaster due to its morphological similarity with species in the genus Kumanasamuha.

== Distribution, ecology, and habitat ==
Chorioactis geaster has a disjunct distribution, and has only been collected from Texas, Oklahoma, Japan, and Taiwan. The first reported collection in Japan was in Kyushu in 1937, and then it was not collected again in that location until 36 years later. In 2006, it was observed in a humid forest near Kawakami, Nara Prefecture. The fungus's natural habitat in Japan is disappearing because of the practice of deforestation and replanting with Japanese cedar (Cryptomeria japonica). This rare mushroom has been put on the list of threatened species in Japan. In Texas, the fungus has been reported in Collin, Hays, Travis, Dallas, Denton, Guadalupe, Tarrant, and Hunt Counties. Travis, Hays, and Guadalupe Counties are in central Texas, while the remainder are clustered together in the northeastern part of the state. Its habitat may be threatened in Texas by industrialization. The fungus was reported from Choctaw County, Oklahoma, in 2017, the first record in North America outside of Texas. A population of the fungus was also discovered in Taiwan in 2023. Although the species is considered rare due to its globally restricted distribution, it may be locally abundant.

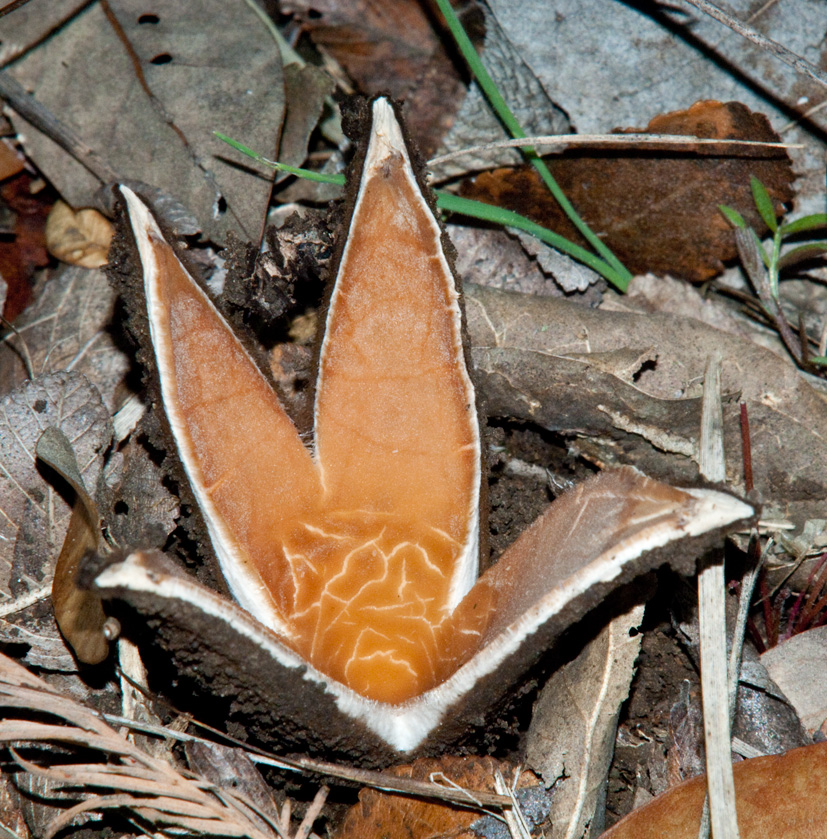
Texan specimen that clearly shows differences in the color and texture of outer, inner, and internal surfaces

Although it is not known definitively, Chorioactis is believed to be saprobic, deriving nutrients from decomposing organic matter. In Texas, fruit bodies are found growing singly or in groups from roots, stumps, and dead roots of cedar elm trees (Ulmus crassifolia) or Symplocos myrtacea; in Japan, the usual host is dead oak trees. Fruit bodies can be clustered together close to the base of the stump, or from the roots away from the stump; the stem of the fruit body tends to originate from a point 5 to 10 cm (2 to 4 in) below the ground. In Texas, fruit bodies usually appear between October and April, as this period is associated with somewhat cooler weather, and the temperature and moisture conditions during this time seem to be more favorable for growth.

Scientists do not know why the fungus lives only in Texas, Japan, and Taiwan, locations of approximately the same latitude, but separated by 11,000 km (6,800 mi). Fred Jay Seaver commented "this is only another illustration of the unusual and unpredictable distribution of many species of the fungi. It would be difficult indeed to account for it, and we merely accept the facts as they are." In 2004, a research study compared the DNA sequences of both populations and used a combination of molecular phylogenetics and molecular clock calculations to estimate the extent of genetic divergence. It concluded that the two populations have been separated for at least 19 million years, ruling out the possibility of human introduction of the species from one location to the other. Although no consistent differences in morphology are seen between the two populations, several differences exist in their life histories. The preferred host of Texan populations is typically roots and stumps of Ulmus crassifolia, while the Japanese populations tend to grow on the fallen trunks of Symplocos myrtacea and Quercus gilva. Texan species grow in areas subjected to periodic flooding, unlike their Japanese counterparts. Finally, only Japanese specimens can be grown in culture—the spores of Texan material have not been successfully germinated on artificial media.
