= Eckblad =

Eckblad is a Norwegian surname. Notable people with the surname include:

- Edel Eckblad (1914–1994), Norwegian actress
- Finn-Egil Eckblad (1923–2000), Norwegian mycologist, brother of Edel

== See also ==
- Ekblad
