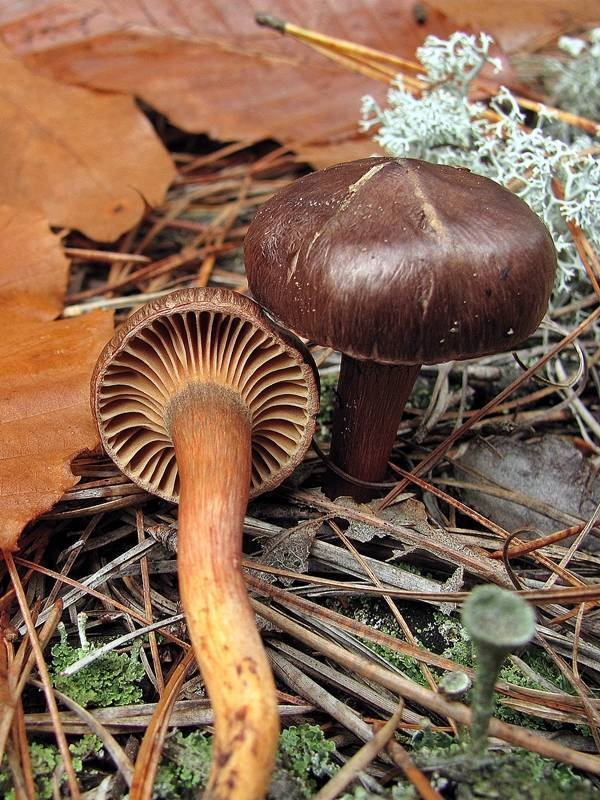

Scientific classification
- Kingdom: Fungi
- Division: Basidiomycota
- Class: Agaricomycetes
- Order: Boletales
- Family: Gomphidiaceae
- Genus: Chroogomphus
- Species: C. vinicolor

Binomial name
- Chroogomphus vinicolor (Peck) O.K.Mill. (1964)

Synonyms
- Gomphidius vinicolor Peck (1898)

= Chroogomphus vinicolor =

Species of fungus

Chroogomphus vinicolor
- Mycological characteristics
- Gills on hymenium
- Cap is convex or depressed
- Hymenium is decurrent or adnate
- Stipe is bare or has a ring
- Spore print is black
- Ecology is mycorrhizal or parasitic
- Edibility is edible

Chroogomphus vinicolor, commonly known as the wine-cap Chroogomphus or the pine spike, is a species of mushroom in the family Gomphidiaceae. The fruit bodies have reddish-brown, shiny caps atop tapered stems. The gills are thick, initially pale orange before turning blackish, and extend a short way down the length of the stem. Distinguishing this species from some other similar Chroogomphus species is difficult, as their morphology is similar, and cap coloration is too variable to be a reliable characteristic. C. vinicolor is differentiated from the European C. rutilus and the North American C. ochraceus by the thickness of its cystidial walls.

The species is found in North America and the Dominican Republic, mushrooms grow on the ground under pine trees. Although the mushroom is edible and sold in local markets in Mexico, it is not highly rated and may cause contact dermatitis.

== Taxonomy ==
The species was first described as Gomphidius vinicolor in 1898 by American mycologist Charles Horton Peck, based on specimens collected near Lake Mohonk in Ulster County, New York. Peck noted a resemblance to Gomphidius roseus, which he thought was closely related. It was transferred to the newly created genus Chroogomphus by Orson K. Miller, Jr. in 1964.

Molecular analysis of internal transcribed spacer DNA sequences shows that C. vinicolor groups in a clade with the closely related C. jamaicensis and C. pseudovinicolor. All of these species feature darkly-amyloid flesh and thick-walled cystidia. Based on this analysis, Miller considered C. jamaicensis to be insufficiently distinct genetically from C. vinicolor to warrant designation as a separate species; however, as of 2012, both MycoBank and Index Fungorum list it as a valid species.

=== Etymology ===
The specific epithet vinicolor means "wine-colored". It is commonly known as the "wine-cap Chroogomphus" or the "pine spike".

== Description ==
The fruit body of C. vinicolor has caps that are initially conical to convex before later flattening out, sometimes developing a small umbo, or a central depression; the caps measure 2–10 cm (3/4–3 7/8 in) wide. Its color is highly variable, ranging from wine-red to reddish-brown to orange-brown or yellow-brown. Wine-red stains develop where the surface has dried or become rotten. The smooth cap surface is shiny, somewhat sticky when wet, and often radially streaked. The flesh is thick and orangish to ochraceous in color; its taste and odor have been variously described as "not distinctive" or "pleasant". The thick gills are decurrent (attached to and extending a short ways down the stem), well spaced, ochraceous buff to pale orange when young, but turning to blackish after the spores mature. In his original description, Peck noted that the gills, when viewed with a hand lens, "appear velvety due to the abundant spores". The fruit bodies are initially covered with a thin, web-like partial veil that soon disappears as the cap expands. The cylindrical stem measures 2.5–15 cm (1–6 in) long by 0.2–2 cm (1/8–3/4 in) thick, and taper towards the base. It is ochraceous to wine red or reddish-brown with a dry, smooth to fibrillose surface. The partial veil sometimes leaves an indistinct, thin fibrous ring on the upper stem.

The spore print is greyish-black. The spores are narrowly elliptical to spindle-shaped, smooth, and measure 17–23 by 4.5–7.5 μm. The cystidia are somewhat spindle-shaped or narrowly club-shaped, and measure 112–164 by 13–20 μm. They have characteristically thick walls, up to 7.5 μm wide in the middle portion.

=== Similar species ===
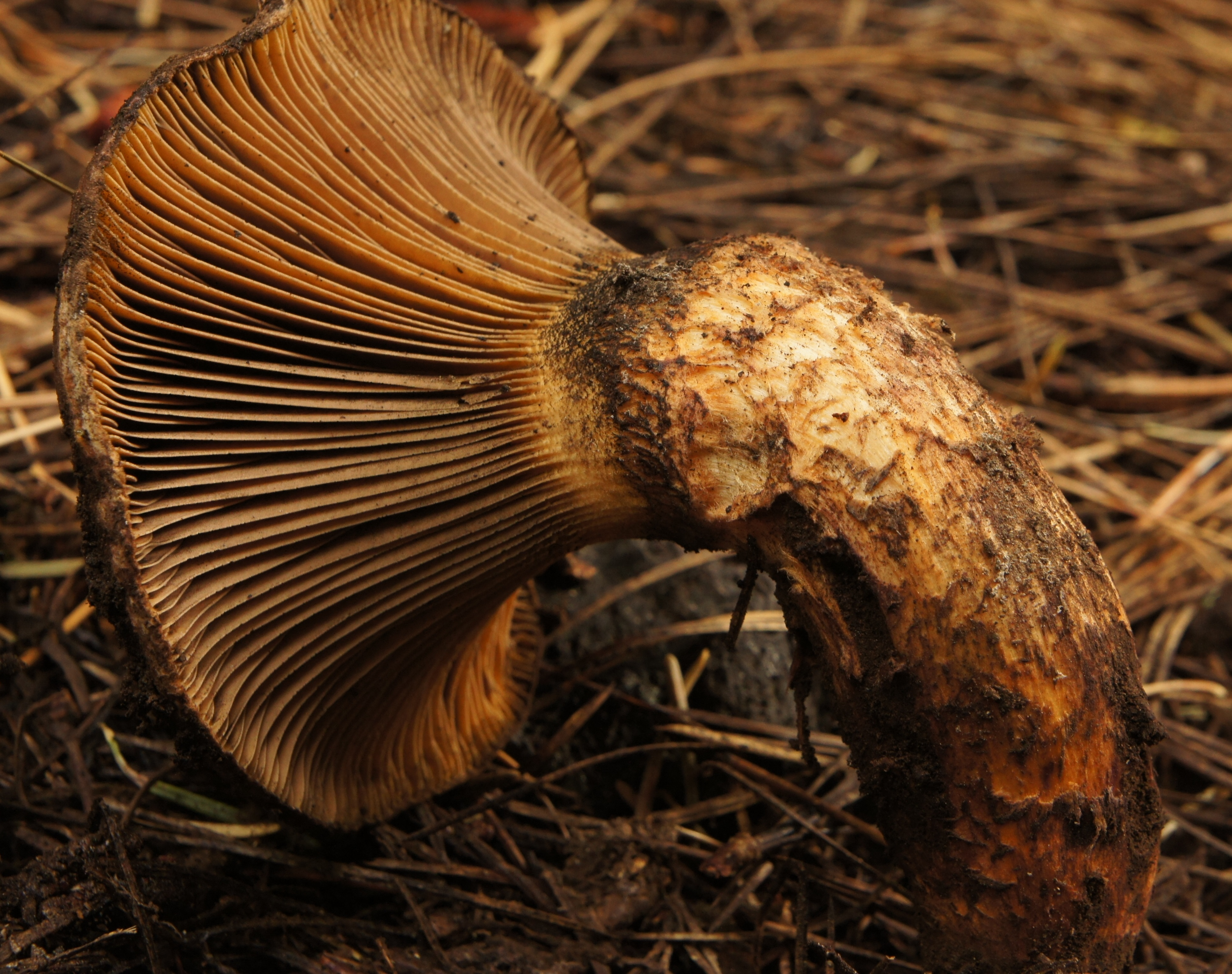
Chroogomphus pseudovinicolor is larger, and has a thick wooly or scaly stem.

Two other Chroogomphus species with a morphology and coloration similar to C. vinicolor include C. rutilus and C. ochraceous. C. vinicolor is most reliably distinguished from these on the basis of having thick-walled cystidia (up to 5–7.5 μm at the widest part). The other two species have been separated on the basis of color, with C. ochraceous having brighter colors (yellowish-orange to ochraceous) than C. rutilus. Molecular analyses of European and North American collections suggest that C. rutilus is restricted to Europe, C. ochraceous only occurs in North America, and that cap coloration cannot be reliably used for species determination.

Another nearly identical species is C. jamaicensis, found in the Dominican Republic, Jamaica, and the Greater Antilles. It is distinguished microscopically by its slightly smaller spores measuring 17–20 by 4.5–6 μm, cystidia with more uniformly thickened walls up to 5 μm thick, and cuticular hyphae that measure 2–5 μm wide. The fruit bodies of C. pseudovinicolor are more robust, with wooly or scaly reddish stems up to 5 cm (2 in) thick. Further, this species tends to produce spore prints that are greener than those of C. vinicolor. Another similar-looking species is C. tomentosus.

Some toxic Cortinarius species are similar in appearance, but can be recognized by their rusty brown spores.

== Habitat and distribution ==
The mycorrhizal fungus sometimes fruits singly, but more often in scattered or groups on the ground under pines and other conifers. Fruiting usually occurs in the cooler weather of later summer and autumn. In coastal California, however, fruiting occurs in winter. It is often found near Suillus luteus and S. brevipes, and is known to parasitize the mycelium of both those and the truffle-like Rhizopogon species. Chroogomphus vinicolor has a widespread range in North America, extending south to Mexico. It has also been recorded from the Dominican Republic.

== Potential uses ==
Although the mushroom is edible, and is often free of insect damage, it is not highly recommended. It can serve as filler along with more flavorful mushrooms. The flavor may improve with drying. C. vinicolor mushrooms are sold in local markets at Tetela del Volcan in the state of Morelos, Mexico. There is a report of this species causing a contact dermatitis, in which an individual who had handled the mushroom developed a burning sensation in the eyes and an itchy rash on the eyelid after rubbing the eyes.
