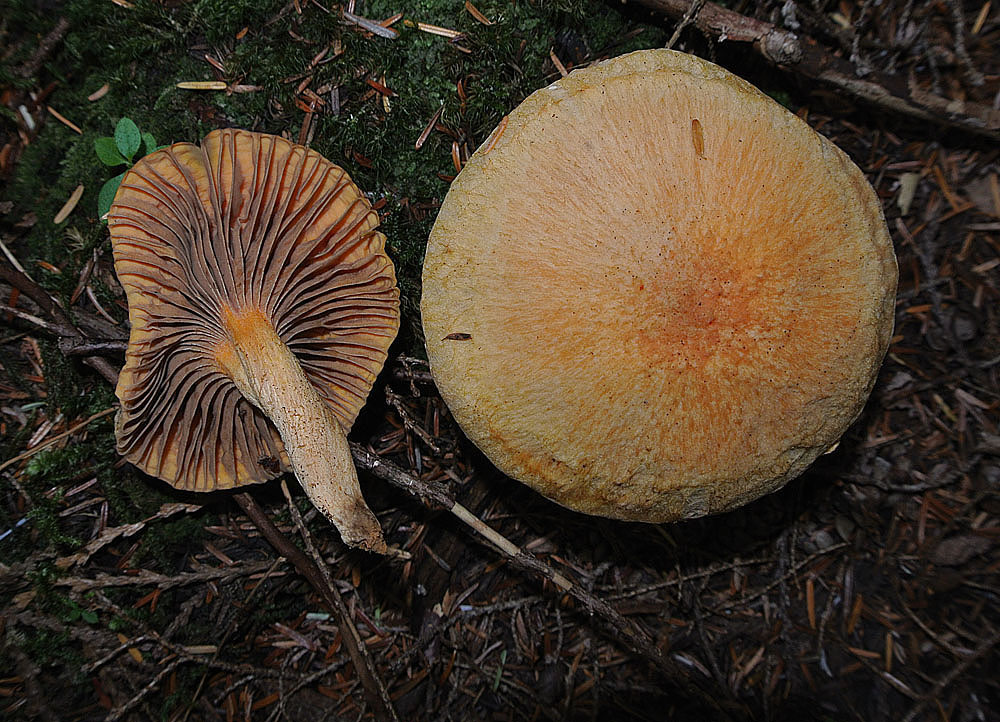

Scientific classification
- Domain: Eukaryota
- Kingdom: Fungi
- Division: Basidiomycota
- Class: Agaricomycetes
- Order: Boletales
- Family: Gomphidiaceae
- Genus: Chroogomphus
- Species: C. ochraceus

Binomial name
- Chroogomphus ochraceus (Kauffman) O.K. Mill.

= Chroogomphus ochraceus =

Species of fungus

Chroogomphus ochraceus Mycological characteristics
- Gills on hymenium
- Cap is conical or flat
- Hymenium is decurrent
- Stipe is bare
- Spore print is black
- Ecology is parasitic
- Edibility is edible

Chroogomphus ochraceus is a species of fungus from the family Gomphidiaceae. Known for its close association with conifer trees–especially pines, it is often referred to as the "pine spike" or "spike cap" fungus. C. ochraceus was originally identified as a species limited to the Pacific Northwest because of its display of distinct yellowish colors, but recent research has concluded that this species is widespread across North America and that it is genetically distinct from Chroogomphus rutilus, which is limited to Europe.

== Taxonomy ==
Although colloquially referred to as a "mushroom", Chroogomphus species fall into the order Boletales, and are only considered "agaricoids" (fungi with mushroom-like fruiting structures).

The classification of Chroogomphus ochraceus has been the topic of debate over recent years. Originally, the European species C. rutilus was thought to be distributed across Europe as well as most of North America. C. ochraceus was thought to be limited to the Pacific Northwest because of the vivid yellowish colors it can produce in that environment. However, recent investigation has found that what has previously been called Chroogomphus rutilus in the United States is genetically distinct from individuals from Europe. Furthermore, C. ochraceus strains from the Pacific Northwest were found to be capable of producing the same colors typical of other species of Chroogomphus if given the right conditions.

It is now consensus that Chroogomphus rutilus is the European species, and Chroogomphus ochraceus is the American species. Individuals previously called C. rutilus in North America are now called C. ochraceus. Another American species, Chroogomphus vinicolor appears superficially similar, but features thick-walled cystidia compared to C. ochraceus' more brittle cystidia.

== Description ==
Chroogomphus species are recognizable for their deep brown to apricot-orange hues. The pileus (cap) of C. ochraceus forms with a conical shape when young, and usually flattens out into a table-top shape–sometimes with a small depression in the center– at maturity when it measures 2.5–9 centimetres (1–3 1/2 in) across. The gills are adnate then decurrent, extending from the edge of the cap all the way to the stipe, growing thicker as they extend down, typical of other gilled boletes. The stipe grows thicker at the base, does not bruise when cut, and does not have a distinctive scent.

Spores are thin-walled and somewhat elliptical, measuring 15–24 x 5–8 μm. The spore print is dark gray to black.

=== Similar species ===
It is similar to Chroogomphus vinicolor, C. pseudovinicoloris, and Suillus pungens.

== Distribution and habitat ==
This species is found all across North America and Hispaniola, reaching into Canada at the north end of its distribution and reaching to Mexico at the southern end. It is known to fruit throughout summer and early fall during cool weather, but can fruit through the winter in areas of Coastal California. It fruits in small clusters.

It was originally thought that since Chroogomphus species are so closely associated with conifer trees, that the two organisms shared a mycorrhizal relationship. Now it is understood that Chroogomphus are likely a parasite of other boletes, Suillus species, that are associated with conifers themselves.

== Edibility ==
Chroogomphus ochraceus, along with the other North American Chroogomphus species, are reportedly edible. However, it has no distinct scent or flavor, and is therefore less desirable as a culinary fungus.
