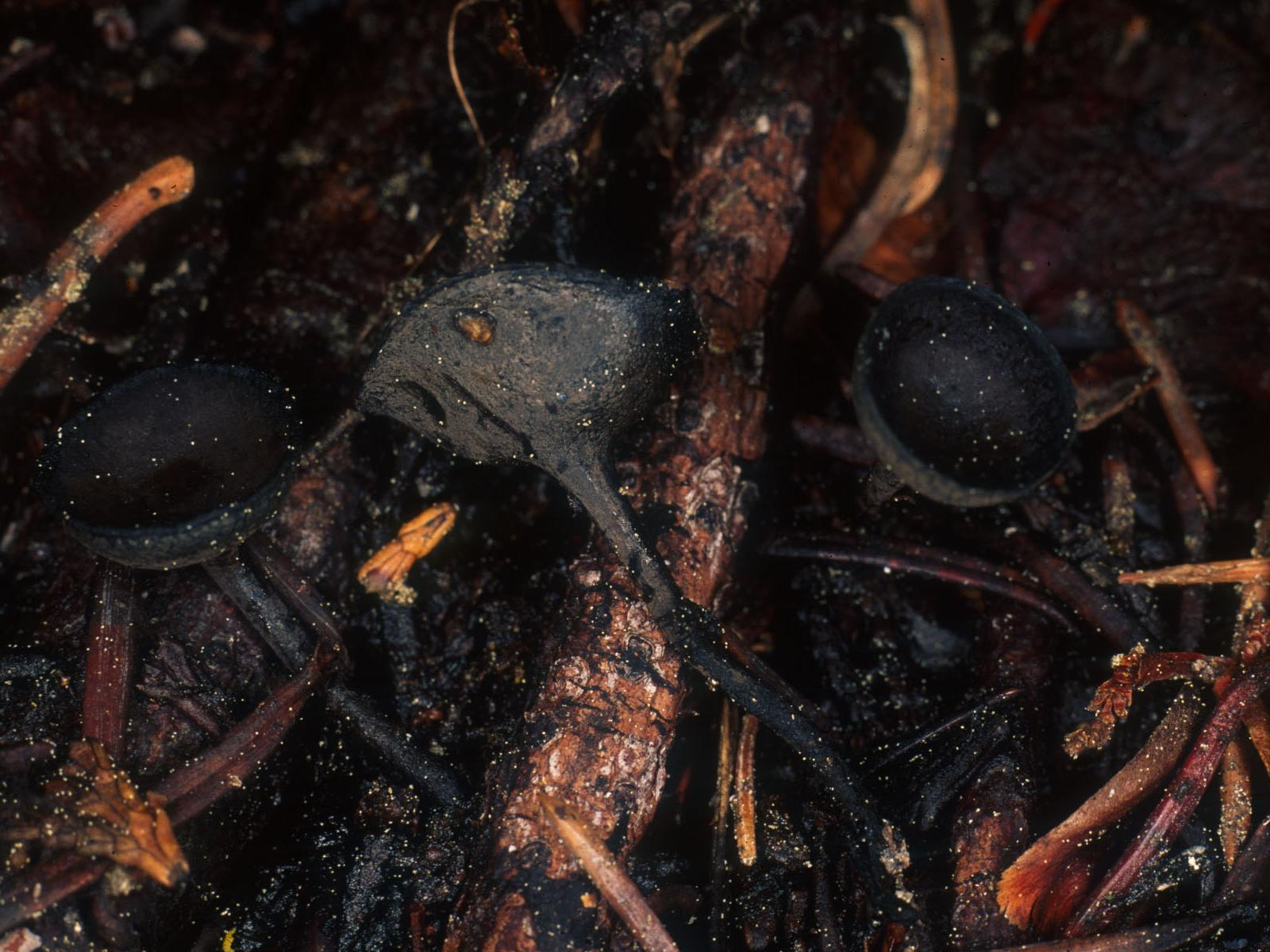
- Plectania nannfeldtii

Scientific classification
- Kingdom: Fungi
- Division: Ascomycota
- Class: Pezizomycetes
- Order: Pezizales
- Family: Sarcosomataceae
- Genus: Plectania; Fuckel (1870)

Type species
- Plectania melastoma (Sowerby II) Fuckel (1870)

Synonyms
- Gloeocalyx Massee (1901); Peziza subgen. Rhizopodella Cooke (1879)

= Plectania =

Genus of fungi

Plectania is a genus of fungi in the family Sarcosomataceae. It was circumscribed by German botanist Karl Wilhelm Gottlieb Leopold Fuckel in 1870.

There were 15 species in the genus in 2008, this has increased to 19 by 2023.

== Distribution ==
It has a widespread, cosmopolitan distribution, especially in northern temperate areas.

== Species ==
As accepted by Species Fungorum;

- Plectania campylospora (Berk.) Nannf. (1957)
- Plectania chilensis (Mont.) Gamundí (1971)
- Plectania cyttarioides (Rehm) Korf (1957)
- Plectania ericae (Donadini) Roqué (2009)
- Plectania gelatinosa Pat. (1907)
- Plectania harnischii M. Carbone, Agnello, A.D. Parker & P. Alvarado (2021)
- Plectania kohniae Korf & W.Y. Zhuang (1991)
- Plectania lutea T. Bau & G.F. Mou (2021)
- Plectania megalocrater (Malençon & Le Gal) M. Carbone, Agnello & Konstantin. (2011)
- Plectania melastoma (Sowerby) Fuckel (1870)
- Plectania milleri Paden & Tylutki (1969)
- Plectania modesta Otani (1973)
- Plectania platensis (Speg.) Rifai (1968)
- Plectania rhytidia (Berk.) Nannf. & Korf (1957)
- Plectania rimosa Peck (1903)
- Plectania rugosa (Le Gal) M. Carbone, Baglivo & Agnello (2010)
- Plectania sichuanensis M. Zeng, Q. Zhao & K.D. Hyde (2021)
- Plectania yunnanensis W.Y. Zhuang (1998)
- Plectania zugazae Calonge & Alb. García (2003)

Former species (all Sarcosomataceae unless stated otherwise);

- P. bulgarioides (P. Karst.) Hazsl. (1886) = Rutstroemia bulgarioides, Rutstroemiaceae
- P. carbonaria (Alb. & Schwein.) Hazsl. (1886) = Geopyxis carbonaria, Pyronemataceae
- P. carranzae Calonge & M. Mata (2002) = Pseudoplectania carranzae
- P. chudei Pat. ex Le Gal (1953) = Kompsoscypha chudei, Sarcoscyphaceae
- P. coccinea (Jacq.) Fuckel (1870) = Sarcoscypha coccinea, Sarcoscyphaceae
- P. coccinea (Scop.) Fuckel ex Seaver (1928) = Sarcoscypha coccinea, Sarcoscyphaceae
- P. coccinea f. albida A.B. Klinge (1944) = Sarcoscypha coccinea, Sarcoscyphaceae
- P. cupularis (L.) Hazsl. (1886) = Tarzetta cupularis, Tarzettaceae
- P. floccosa (Sacc.) Seaver (1928) = Microstoma floccosum, Sarcoscyphaceae
- P. helvelloides (Donadini, Berthet & Astier) Donadini (1987) = Urnula helvelloides
- P. hiemalis (Bernstein) Seaver (1928) = Microstoma protractum, Sarcoscyphaceae
- P. infundibulum Hazsl. (1887) = Galactinia infundibulum, Pezizaceae
- P. latahensis (Paden & Tylutki) M. Carbone, Agnello & Baglivo (2009) = Pseudosarcosoma latahense, Chorioactidaceae
- P. lilliputiana Le Gal (1953) = Sarcoscypha lilliputiana, Sarcoscyphaceae
- P. lusitanica (Torrend & Boud.) M. Carbone, Agnello, Baglivo & O. Perić (2012) = Urnula lusitanica
- P. mediterranea M. Carbone, Agnello & Baglivo (2009) = Urnula mediterranea
- P. melaena (Fr.) Paden (1982) = Pseudoplectania melaena
- P. mexicana (Ellis & Holw.) Paden (1983) = Urnula mexicana
- P. minuscula (Boud. & Torrend) Le Gal (1953) = Pseudopithyella minuscula, Sarcoscyphaceae
- P. nannfeldtii Korf (1957) = Donadinia nigrella
- P. nigrella (Pers.) P. Karst. (1885) = Pseudoplectania nigrella
- P. occidentalis (Schwein.) Seaver (1928) = Sarcoscypha occidentalis, Sarcoscyphaceae
- P. protracta (Fr.) S. Imai (1938) = Microstoma protractum, Sarcoscyphaceae
- P. rhytidia f. platensis (Speg.) Donadini (1985) = Plectania platensis
- P. seaveri M. Carbone, Agnello & LaGreca (2012) = Donadinia seaveri
- P. serrata Le Gal (1953) = Sarcoscypha serrata, Sarcoscyphaceae
- P. stenostoma (Mart.) Sacc. (1889) = Plectania melastoma

== See also ==
- Pseudoplectania
