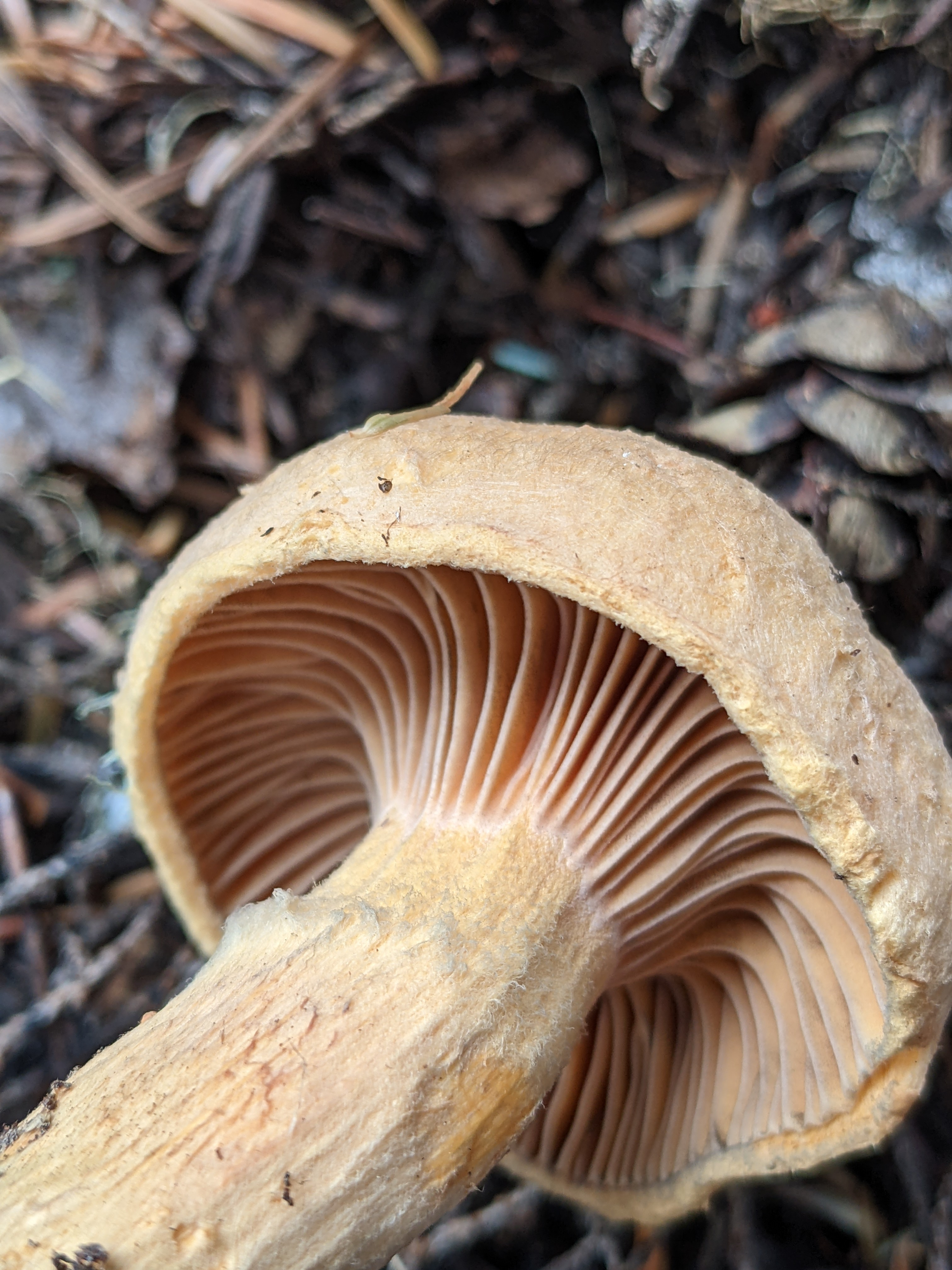

Scientific classification
- Kingdom: Fungi
- Division: Basidiomycota
- Class: Agaricomycetes
- Order: Boletales
- Family: Gomphidiaceae
- Genus: Chroogomphus
- Species: C. tomentosus

Binomial name
- Chroogomphus tomentosus (Murrill) O.K. Mill.

= Chroogomphus tomentosus =

Chroogomphus tomentosus, commonly known as the woolly pine spike, is a species of mushroom in the family Gomphidiaceae. It is endemic to western North America.

== Description ==
The cap of Chroogomphus tomentosus starts out peglike in shape. Later, it becomes conical, umbonate, convex, or flat. It is fibrillose. Unlike other mushrooms in its group, which typically have viscid caps, Chroogomphus tomentosus does not. It is orangish in color, and about 3-10 centimeters in diameter. The stipe is about 5-15 centimeters long and 0.5-1.5 centimeters wide. The gills most often decurrent, and start out a similar color to the cap. As the mushroom ages, the gills turn tan or brownish. The spore print is gray or blackish.

== Habitat and ecology ==
Chroogomphus tomentosus is found in forests with western hemlock, and is commonly found near rotting logs. It forms an association with the admirable bolete (Aureoboletus mirabilis), a mycorrhizal fungus that forms a symbiotic relationship with hemlock trees. It is likely that C. tomentosus is parasitic to A. mirabilis. It starts fruiting during summer, and continues into winter.

== Edibility ==
As with other species of Chroogomphus, C. tomentosus cooks up slimy, and it is therefore recommended to dry it before eating. It also turns purple when cooked, like other Chroogomphus species.

Chroogomphus tomentosus
- Mycological characteristics
- Gills on hymenium
- Cap is convex or flat
- Hymenium is decurrent
- Stipe is bare
- Spore print is blackish-brown
- Ecology is parasitic
- Edibility is edible
