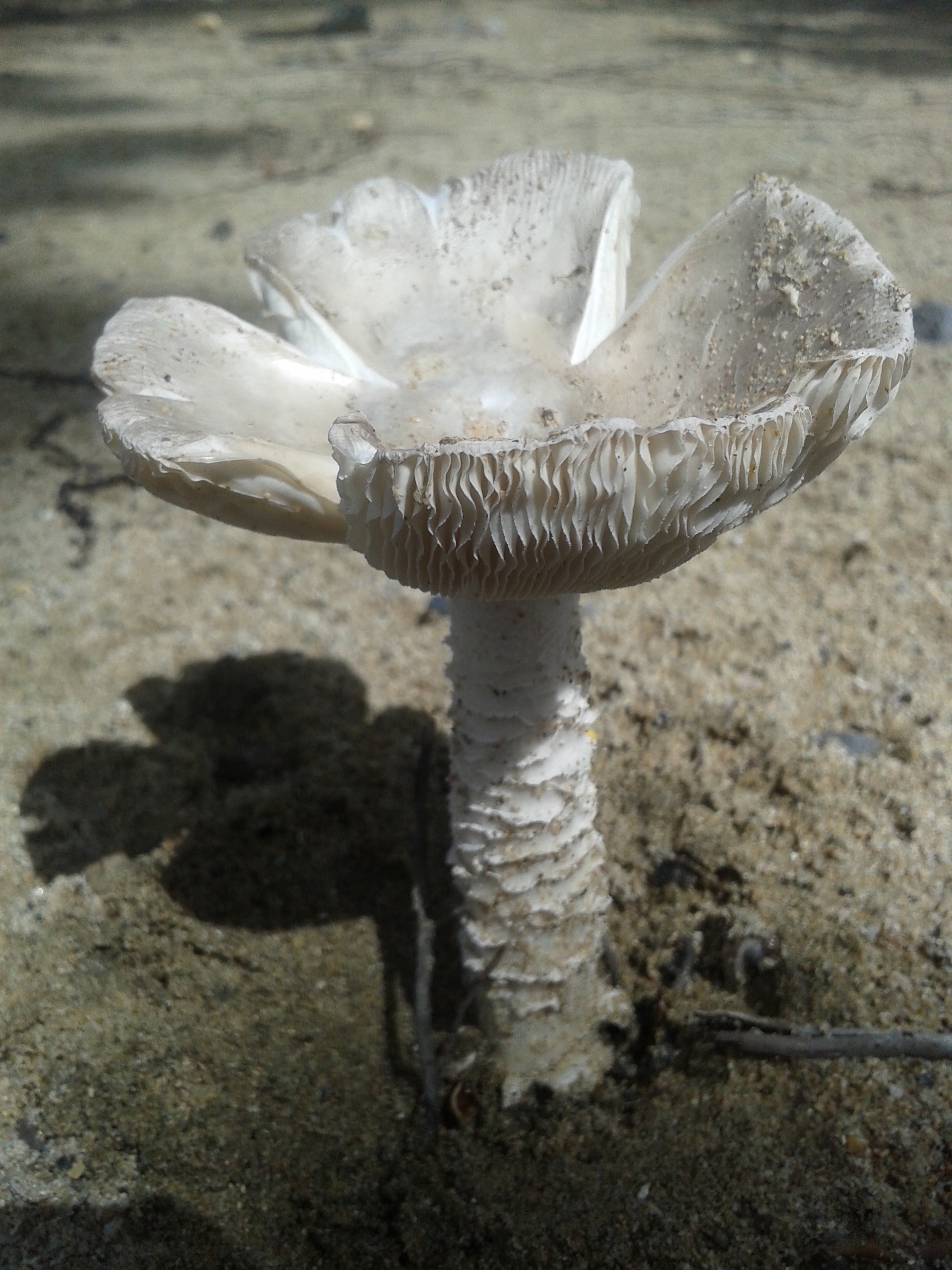

Conservation status
- Endangered (IUCN 3.1)

Scientific classification
- Kingdom: Fungi
- Division: Basidiomycota
- Class: Agaricomycetes
- Order: Agaricales
- Family: Amanitaceae
- Genus: Amanita
- Species: A. arenicola

Binomial name
- Amanita arenicola Orson K. Miller Jr.

= Amanita arenicola =

Species of mushroom

Amanita arenicola
- Mycological characteristics
- Gills on hymenium
- Cap is depressed or infundibuliform
- Hymenium is free
- Stipe has a volva
- Spore print is yellow
- Ecology is mycorrhizal
- Edibility is unknown

Amanita arenicola, commonly known as the beach-loving ringless amanita, is a species of mushroom-forming fungus in the family Amanitaceae. It is characterized by its gray cap, white stipe with wart-like protrusions, and affinity for sandy shores. A. arenicola lacks an annulus on its stipe, and has been found in Quintana Roo, Mexico, as well as the British Virgin Islands and Puerto Rico.

== Taxonomy ==
Amanita arenicola was first described by mycologists Orson K. Miller Jr. and Jean D. Lodge in 2000, based on a series of specimens found along the coast of Puerto Rico and the Virgin Islands. They were placed in the Amanita sect. Vaginatae due to the absence of a partial veil and the plicate-striate margin present along the cap.

The specific epithet arenicola means 'beach' and 'dweller'. A. arenicola is commonly known as the 'beach-loving ringless amanita', due to its distinctive lack of a ring and its presence in coastal areas.

== Description ==
The cap is initially convex, similarly to many other species of Amanita, and grows flatter until it eventually becomes strongly depressed or completely infundibuliform. One source describes fully grown specimens as "moist to sticky, sand covered, smooth, [and] [d]rab [g]ray".

The basidiospores are described as 9-12.5 by 7-10 μm in size and it's shape may be subglubose to elliptic.

== Distribution and habitat ==
It is distributed along the Atlantic coastlines of the Americas. More recently, specimens have been confirmed throughout Southern Florida and Mexico.

As a mycorrhizal species, A. arenicola can usually be found growing around species of Coccoloba uvifera, particularly near the tropics.

== Conservation ==
A. arenicola has been suggested to be an endangered species due to increases in sea level threatening its ecosystem.

== See also ==
- List of Amanita species
