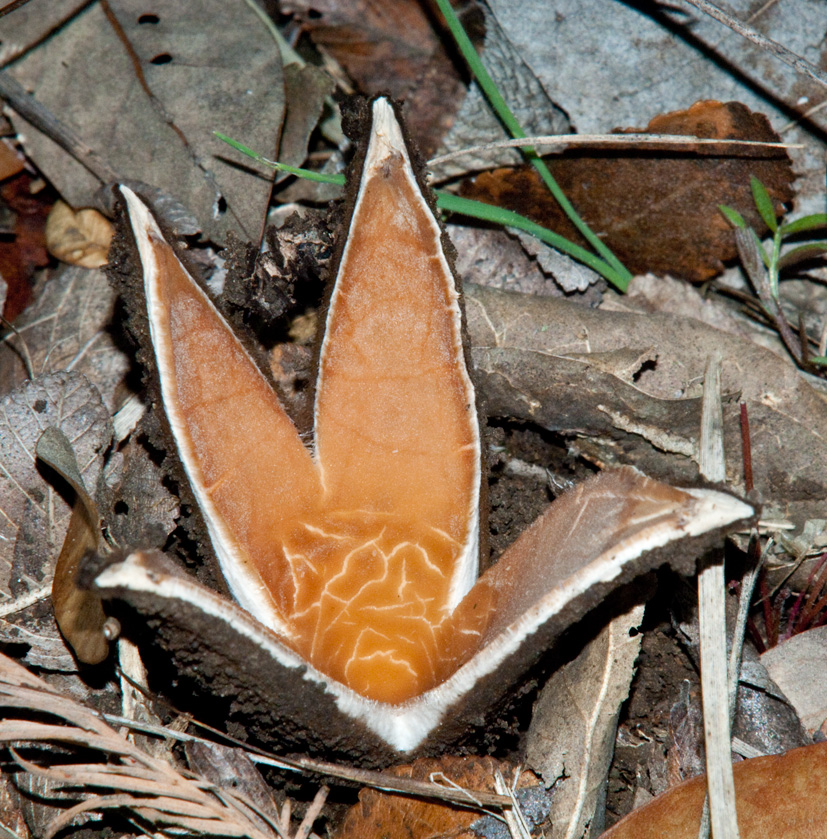
- Chorioactis geaster

Scientific classification
- Kingdom: Fungi
- Division: Ascomycota
- Class: Pezizomycetes
- Order: Pezizales
- Family: Chorioactidaceae; Pfister (2008)

Type genus
- Chorioactis Kupfer (1902)

Genera
- Chorioactis; Desmazierella; Neournula; Pseudosarcosoma; Trichaleurina; Wolfina

= Chorioactidaceae =

Family of fungi

The Chorioactidaceae are a family of cup fungi in the order Pezizales, first described to contain seven species distributed among five genera. Pseudosarcosoma was added in 2013 to contain P. latahense when molecular phylogenetic studies demonstrated the fungus to be more closely related to the Chorioactidaceae than to Sarcosoma (family Sarcosomataceae). With the addition of Trichaleurina, the genus is currently composed of six genera.

Ecologically, taxa in this family are saprotrophic, and inhabit temperate and subtropical regions.
