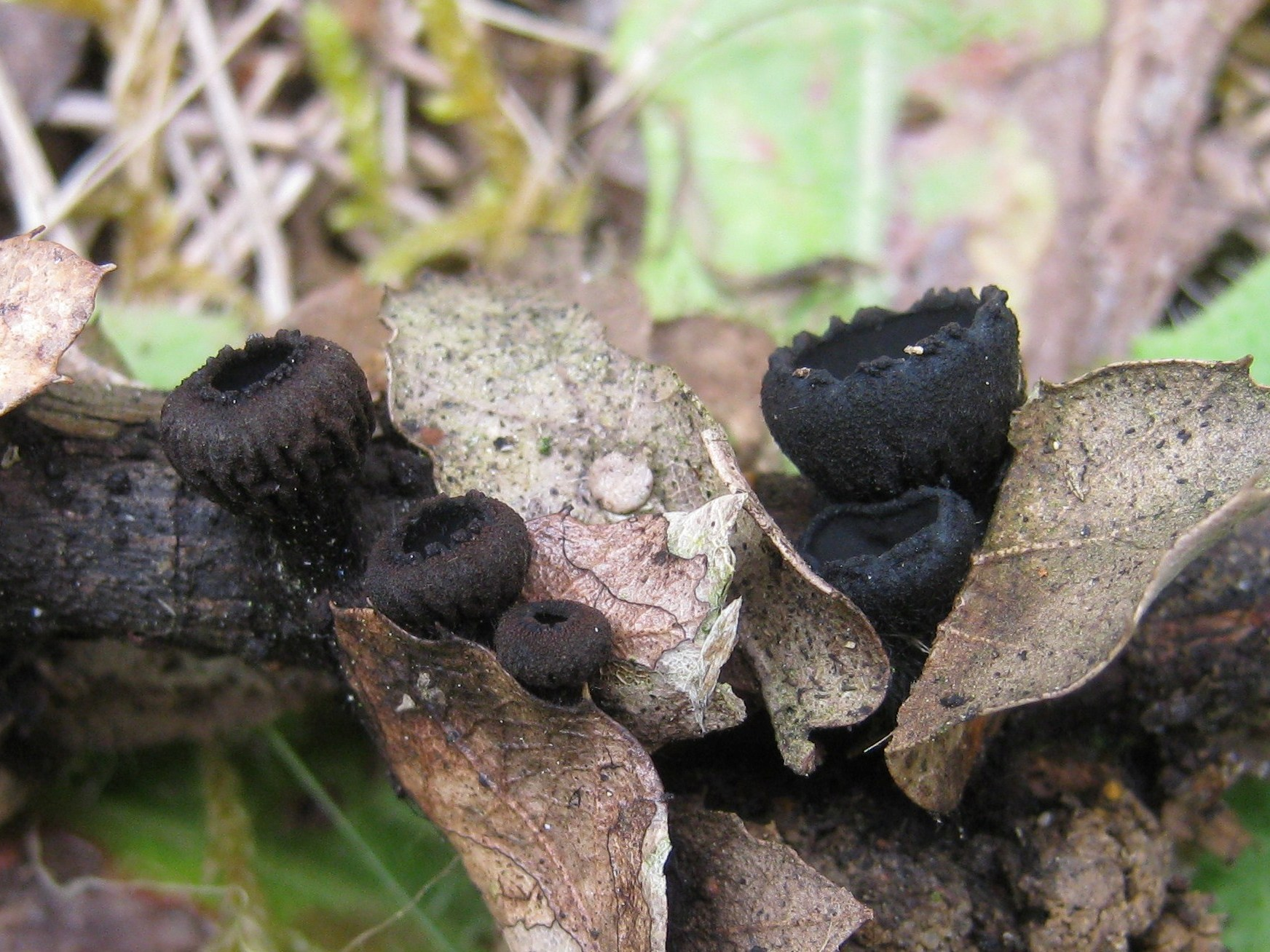

Scientific classification
- Domain: Eukaryota
- Kingdom: Fungi
- Division: Ascomycota
- Class: Pezizomycetes
- Order: Pezizales
- Family: Sarcosomataceae
- Genus: Plectania
- Species: P. rhytidia

Binomial name
- Plectania rhytidia (Berk.) Nannf. & Korf (1957)

Synonyms
- Peziza rhytidia Berk. (1855); Urnula rhytidia (Berk.) Cooke (1889); Sarcosoma rhytidium (Berk.) Le Gal (1953); Sarcosoma rhytidia (Berk.) Le Gal (1953)

= Plectania rhytidia =

Species of fungus

Plectania rhytidia is a species of fungus in the family Sarcosomataceae. Originally described under the name Peziza rhytidia by Miles Joseph Berkeley in 1855, the species was transferred to Plectania by mycologists John Axel Nannfeldt and Richard P. Korf in 1957.
