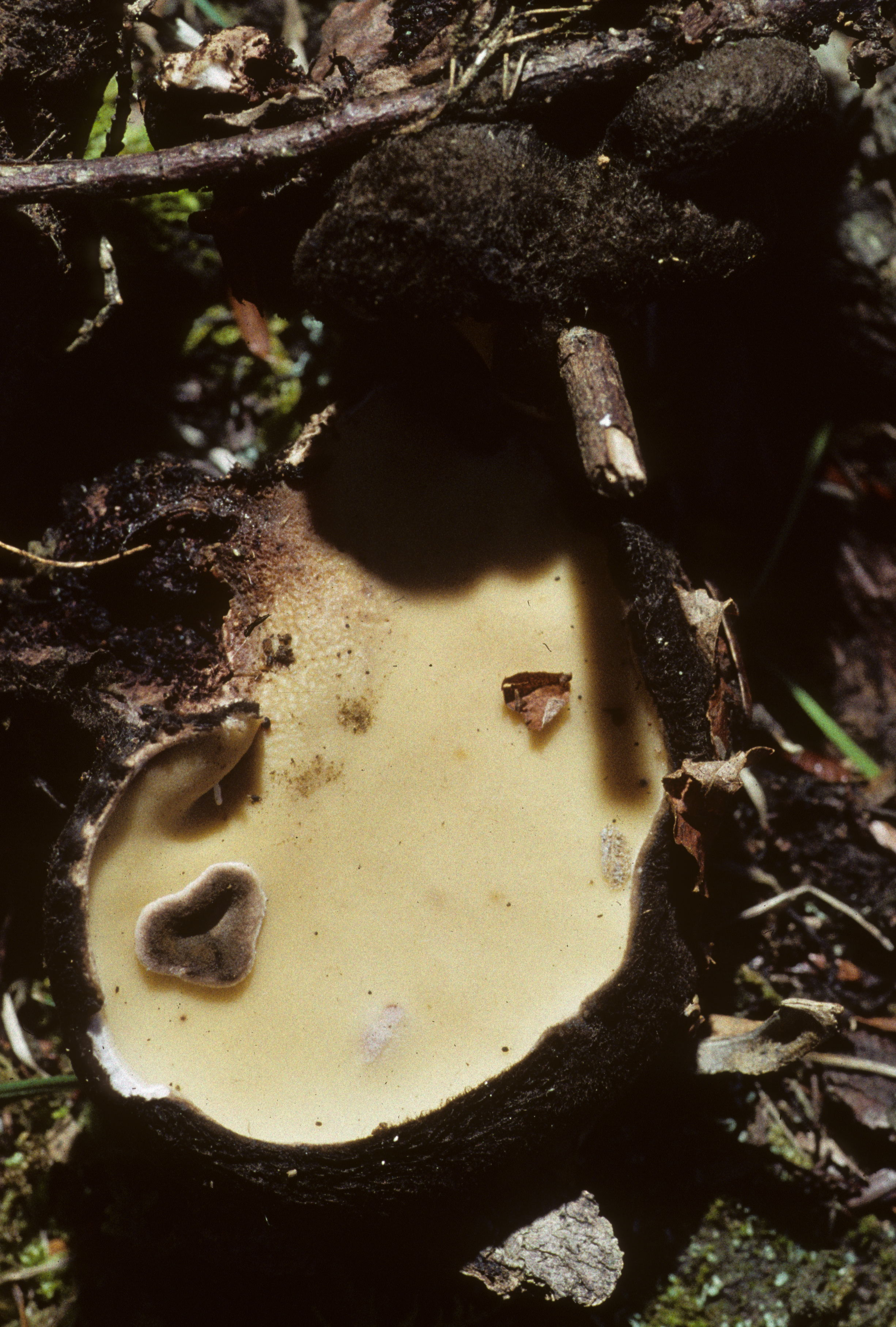
- Wolfina aurantiopsis

Scientific classification
- Kingdom: Fungi
- Division: Ascomycota
- Class: Pezizomycetes
- Order: Pezizales
- Family: Chorioactidaceae
- Genus: Wolfina; Seaver ex Eckblad (1968)

Type species
- Wolfina aurantiopsis (Ellis) Seaver (1937)

Species
- W. aurantiopsis W. oblongispora W. papuana

= Wolfina =

Genus of fungi

Wolfina is a genus of fungi in the family Chorioactidaceae. There are three species in the genus, found in the USA and China.

Known species include:

- Wolfina aurantiopsis
- Wolfina oblongispora
- Wolfina papuana
