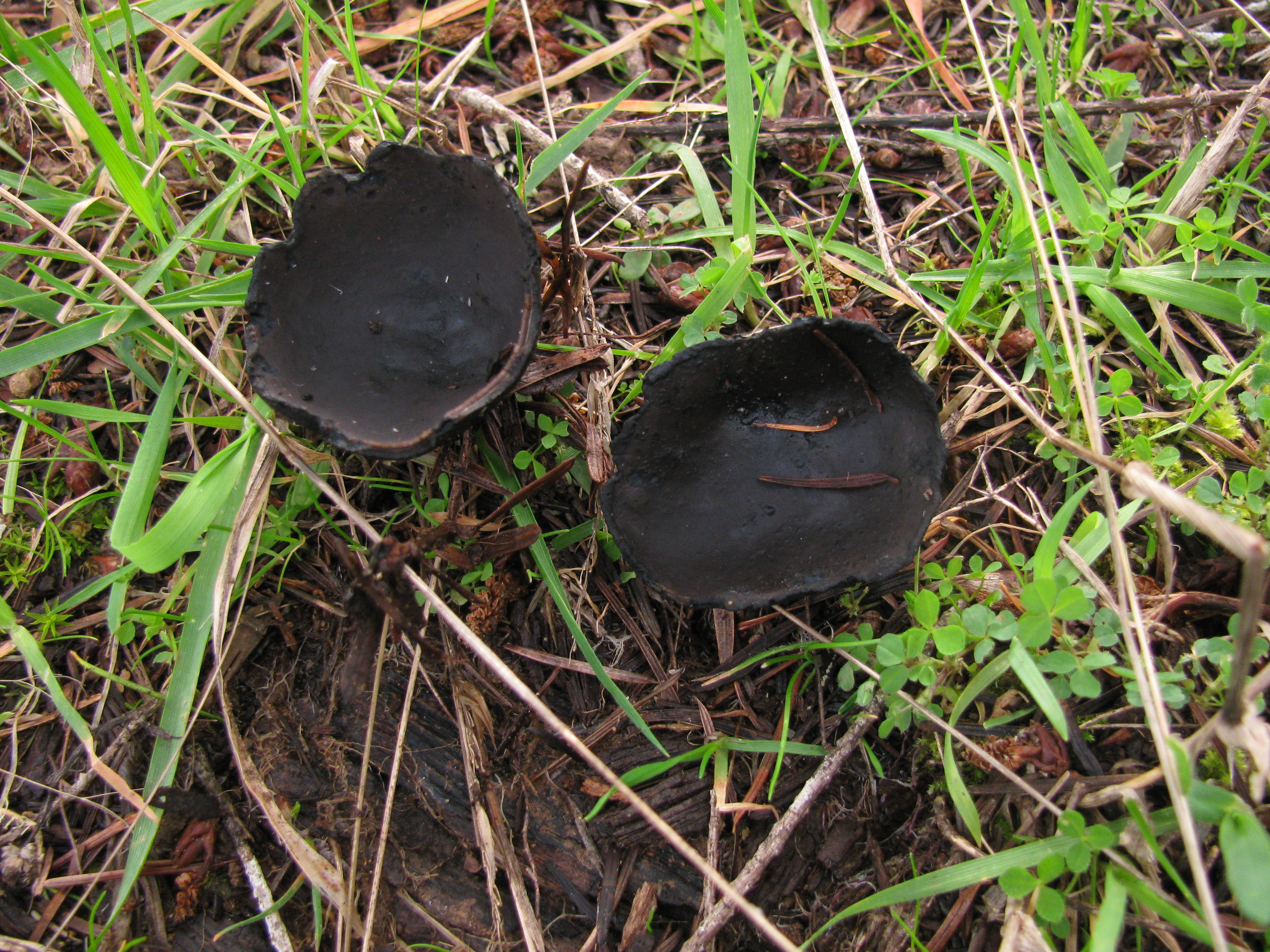

Conservation status
- Vulnerable (NatureServe)

Scientific classification
- Domain: Eukaryota
- Kingdom: Fungi
- Division: Ascomycota
- Class: Pezizomycetes
- Order: Pezizales
- Family: Sarcosomataceae
- Genus: Plectania
- Species: P. milleri

Binomial name
- Plectania milleri Paden & Tylutki (1969)

= Plectania milleri =

Species of fungus

Plectania milleri is a species of fungus in the family Sarcosomataceae. Found in western North America, it was described as new to science in 1969. It is named in honor of mycologist Orson K. Miller.
