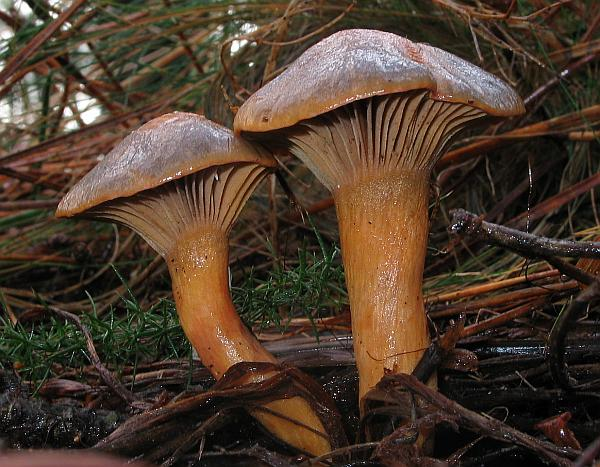
- Chroogomphus rutilus

Scientific classification
- Kingdom: Fungi
- Division: Basidiomycota
- Class: Agaricomycetes
- Order: Boletales
- Family: Gomphidiaceae
- Genus: Chroogomphus (Singer) O.K.Mill. (1964)

Type species
- Chroogomphus rutilus (Schaeff.) O.K.Mill. (1964)

Synonyms
- Gomphidius subgen. Chroogomphus Singer (1948); Brauniellula A.H.Sm. & Singer (1959)

= Chroogomphus =

Genus of fungi

Chroogomphus /kroʊ.əˈɡɒmfəs/ is a genus of fungi commonly known as pine-spikes or spike-caps, based on the shape of the mushrooms and because they often grow in association with pines. The genus is distributed throughout the Northern Hemisphere, including North America and Eurasia.

== Taxonomy ==
These fungi are members of the family Gomphidiaceae which are agaricoid members of the Boletales (suborder Suillineae). Related to the genus Gomphidius (in which they were once classified), Chroogomphus are distinguished from Gomphidius by their lack of a partial veil.

Chroogomphus rutilus, found in Europe, is the type species.

Accepted species of Chroogomphus include:

Image	Scientific name	Year	Distribution
	Chroogomphus albipes (Zeller) Yan C. Li & Zhu L. Yang	2009	Sierra Nevada
	Chroogomphus asiaticus O.K. Mill. & Aime	2001	Eastern Siberia, Nepal
	Chroogomphus conacytiensis Ayala-Vásquez, Martínez-Reyes, Pérez-Moreno	2023	Mexico
	Chroogomphus confusus Yan C. Li & Zhu L. Yang	2009	China (Yunnan)
	Chroogomphus filiformis Yan C. Li & Zhu L. Yang	2009	China (Yunnan)
	Chroogomphus flavovinaceus Ayala-Vásquez, Martínez-Reyes, Pérez-Moreno	2023	Mexico
	Chroogomphus fulmineus (R. Heim) Courtec.	1988	France
	Chroogomphus helveticus (Singer) M.M. Moser	1967	Czech Republic, United States, Austria, Switzerland, Czech Republic
	Chroogomphus himalayanus K. Das, Hembrom, A. Parihar & Vizzini	2021	India
	Chroogomphus jamaicensis (Murrill) O.K. Mill.	1964	United States, Dominican Republic, Jamaica
	Chroogomphus leptocystis (Singer) O.K. Mill.	1964	Canada
	Chroogomphus loculatus Trappe & O.K. Mill.	1970	United States
	Chroogomphus mediterraneus (Finschow) Vila, Pérez-De-Greg. & G. Mir	2006	Greece, United Kingdom, Spain
	Chroogomphus ochraceus (Kauffman) O.K. Mill.	1964	United States, Canada
	Chroogomphus orientirutilus Yan C. Li & Zhu L. Yang	2009	China (Yunnan)
	Chroogomphus pakistanicus M. Kiran & A.N. Khalid	2020	Pakistan
	Chroogomphus papillatus (Raithelh.) Raithelh.	1983	Southern Hemisphere
	Chroogomphus pruinosus M. Kiran & A.N. Khalid	2020	Pakistan
	Chroogomphus pseudotomentosus O.K. Mill. & Aime	2001	China (Yunnan)
	Chroogomphus pseudovinicolor O.K. Mill.	1967	United States
	Chroogomphus purpurascens (Lj.N. Vassiljeva) M.M. Nazarova	1990	China, Russia, Germany
	Chroogomphus roseolus Yan C. Li & Zhu L. Yang	2009	China
	Chroogomphus rutilus (Schaeff.) O.K. Mill.	1964	Finland, Greece, Russia, South Korea
	Chroogomphus sibiricus (Singer) O.K. Mill.	1964	Russia
	Chroogomphus subfulmineus Niskanen, Loizides, Scambler & Liimat.	2018	Italy, Spain, Cyprus
	Chroogomphus superiorensis (Kauffman & A.H. Sm.) Singer	1975	
	Chroogomphus tomentosus (Murrill) O.K. Mill.	1964	Canada, United States
	Chroogomphus vinicolor (Peck) O.K. Mill.	1964	United States

=== Etymology ===
The genus name is derived from the Greek χρω- (chroo-), meaning "skin" or "colour", and γομφος (gomphos) meaning "plug" or "large wedge-shaped nail".

== Description ==
The cap of C. rutilus is up to 10 centimetres (4 inches) in diameter and red-brown in colour. The widely spaced gills are brownish-orange and decurrent with black to brownish-yellow spores. The stalk is brownish-yellow and tapers toward the base. The flesh is orange to salmon-coloured and turns violet when chewed.

Chroogomphus ochraceus of North America is very similar in habit and appearance to C. rutilus, and the latter name has often been misapplied to C. ochraceus.

Chroogomphus vinicolor, another North American species, is likewise similar to C. rutilus, although C. vinicolor tends to be smaller. The cap color is variable in both species, with C. vinicolor being, as its scientific name suggests, more wine-colored while C. rutilus is usually more brown. The most distinctive differences between these three species are microscopic.

== Distribution and habitat ==
The genus is distributed throughout the Northern Hemisphere including North America, the Caribbean, Europe, and Asia.

== Ecology ==
Members of this genus have been thought to be ectomycorrhizal with various species of pine, but there is now evidence that all members of the Gomphidiaceae are parasitic upon other boletes. Specifically, Chroogomphus species are thought to be parasitic on various conifer-associated Suillus species, with this parasitism often being highly species-specific.

In the Pacific Northwest of North America, C. tomentosus is found with Pseudotsuga menziesii (Douglas-fir) and Tsuga heterophylla (western hemlock). C. helveticus of Europe is found in conifer forests containing spruce (Picea ssp.).

== Uses ==
Chroogomphus rutilus, C. oregonensis, C. tomentosus, and C. vinicolor are edible and may be interchangeable for culinary purposes, but are not regarded highly and possess neither a distinctive taste nor odor. One food writer states about C. rutilus and C. vinicolor:

They are excellent when dried, have a firm chewy texture but almost no flavor. This means you can put them in any dish without worrying about overpowering them - there's nothing to overpower! They make an excellent textural addition, though, a little crunchy, a little rubbery, very pleasant. Use them in tomato sauce as a meat substitute, or in a spicy Thai curry. You can't go wrong, because you can't taste them.

David Arora states in his book Mushrooms Demystified that "some relatively unknown mushrooms (e.g., Chroogomphus) are quite good."

Chroogomphus rutilus has been the subject of investigation as the source of antibiotics, as well as other potentially useful secondary compounds.
