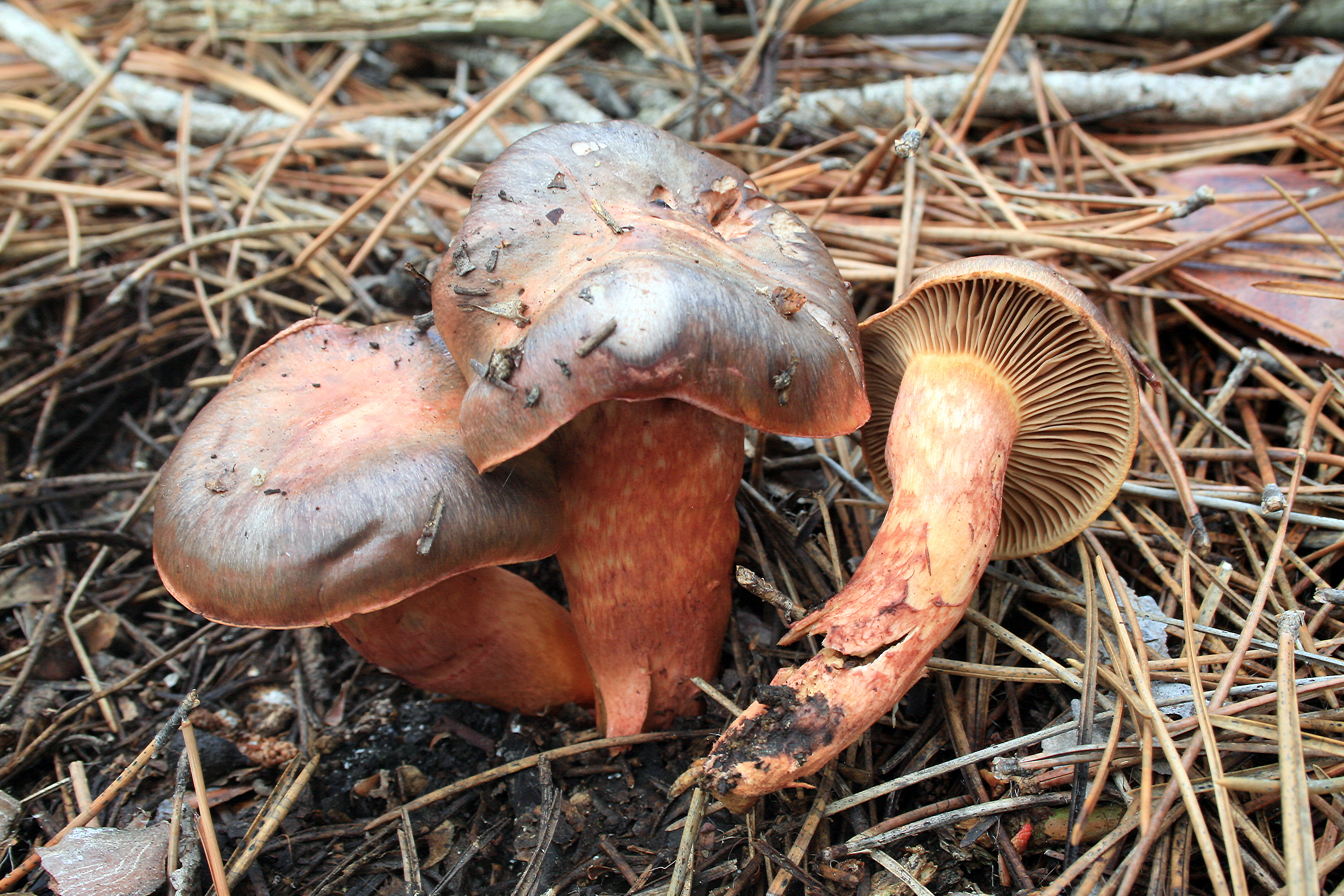

Scientific classification
- Domain: Eukaryota
- Kingdom: Fungi
- Division: Basidiomycota
- Class: Agaricomycetes
- Order: Boletales
- Family: Gomphidiaceae
- Genus: Chroogomphus
- Species: C. subfulmineus

Binomial name
- Chroogomphus subfulmineus Niskanen, Loizides, Scambler & Liimat. (2018)

= Chroogomphus subfulmineus =

Species of fungus

Chroogomphus subfulmineus is a basidiomycete fungus in the family Gomphidiaceae, described as new to science in 2018.

This species is closely related to Chroogomphus fulmineus, but produces larger fruit bodies with generally duller colours, a deep yolk-yellow trama and an olivaceous stipe base. Microscopically, it has more narrow cystidia (av. range 13.8–14.8 μm) than C. fulmineus and broader spores (av. range 17.5–21.6 × 6.4–7.7 μm).

It is so far known from the island of Cyprus, Finland, and the United Kingdom.
