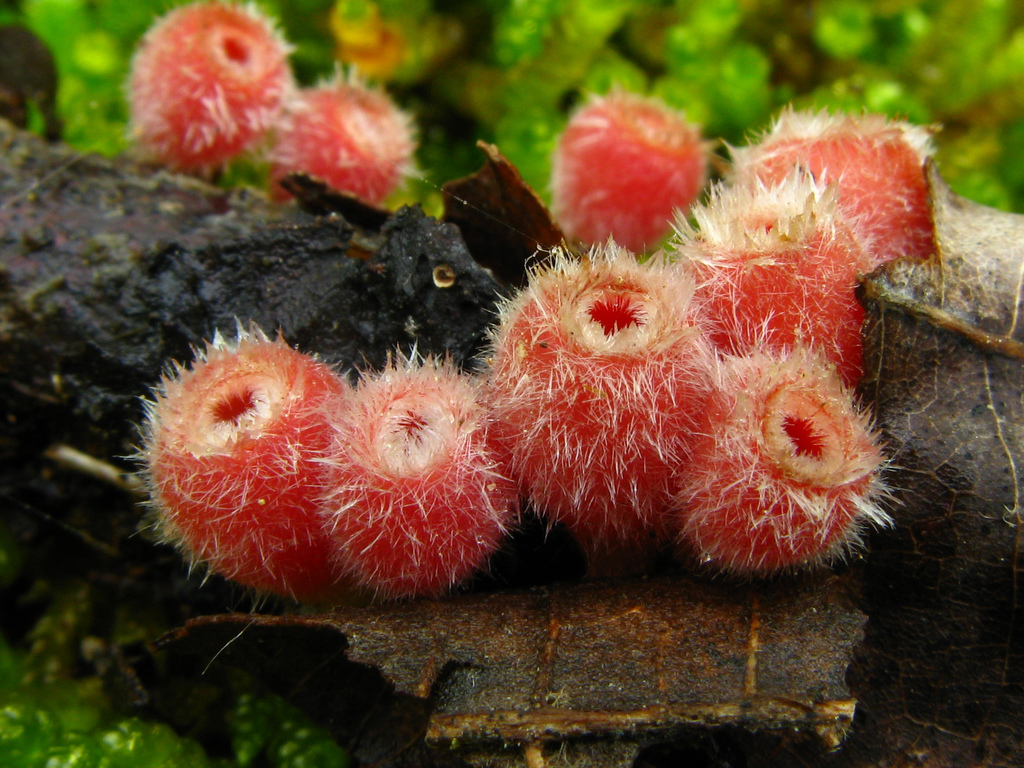

Scientific classification
- Domain: Eukaryota
- Kingdom: Fungi
- Division: Ascomycota
- Class: Pezizomycetes
- Order: Pezizales
- Family: Sarcoscyphaceae
- Genus: Microstoma
- Species: M. floccosum

Binomial name
- Microstoma floccosum (Schwein.) Raitv. (1965)

Synonyms
- Peziza floccosa Schwein. (1832); Sarcoscypha floccosa (Schwein.) Cooke (1889); Geopyxis floccosa (Schwein.) Morgan (1902); Plectania floccosa (Schwein.) Seaver (1928); Anthopeziza floccosa (Schwein.) Kanouse (1948)

= Microstoma floccosum =

Species of fungus

Microstoma floccosum is a species in the cup fungus family Sarcoscyphaceae. It is recognizable by its deep funnel-shaped, scarlet-colored fruit bodies bearing white hairs on the exterior. Found in the United States and Asia, it grows on partially buried sticks and twigs of oak trees.

== Taxonomy ==
One variant species has been described, M. floccosum var. floccosum, found in China and Japan, with large spores. The fungus originally described as Microstoma floccosum var. macrosporum was recognized as an independent species in 2000 and renamed to M. macrosporum. It differs from M. floccosum by fruiting season, asci and ascospore size, and the ultrastructure of the hairs.

== Description ==
The diameter of the cup- or funnel-shaped fruit bodies is 0.5 to 0.8 centimetres (1/4 to 3/8 in) in diameter; the margins of the cup are curved inwards when young. Both the interior and exterior surfaces of the cup are scarlet red. The exterior surface is covered with stiff white hairs. Details of the hair structure may be seen with a magnifying glass: they are up to 1 mm long or more, translucent, thick-walled, rigid and more or less sword-shaped with simple, sharply diminishing bases. They are connected to the fruit body at the junction of internal tissue layers called the medullary and ectal excipulums. When the hairs come in contact with an alkali solution of 2% potassium hydroxide, the thick walls of the base of the hair first swell in size and then dissolve, releasing the contents of the internal lumen. The stipe is cylindrical, and about 1 to 5 cm (3/8 to 2 in) long by 1–2 mm thick.

The species is inedible.

=== Microscopic characteristics ===
The spores are 20–30 by 14–16 μm; the asci (spore-bearing cells) are 300–350 by 18–20 μm. The paraphyses (sterile, upright, basally attached filaments in the hymenium, growing between asci) are thin, slightly thickened at the tip and contain many red granules.

=== Similar species ===
Microstoma apiculosporum is a species from Taiwan that has spores with short, sharply pointed tips. Scutellinia scutellata has a shallow red cup, no stalk, and black hairs on only the edge of the cap margin. The stalked scarlet cup, Sarcoscypha occidentalis, has a shape, size and color that somewhat resemble M. floccosum, but it lacks any surface hairs, and the cup is not as deep.

== Distribution and habitat ==
Microstoma floccosum has been collected from the United States, India, China, and Japan.

A saprobic species, M. floccosum grows scattered to clustered together, attached to wood that is typically partially buried in the earth. A preference for both oak and Shagbark hickory has been noted.
