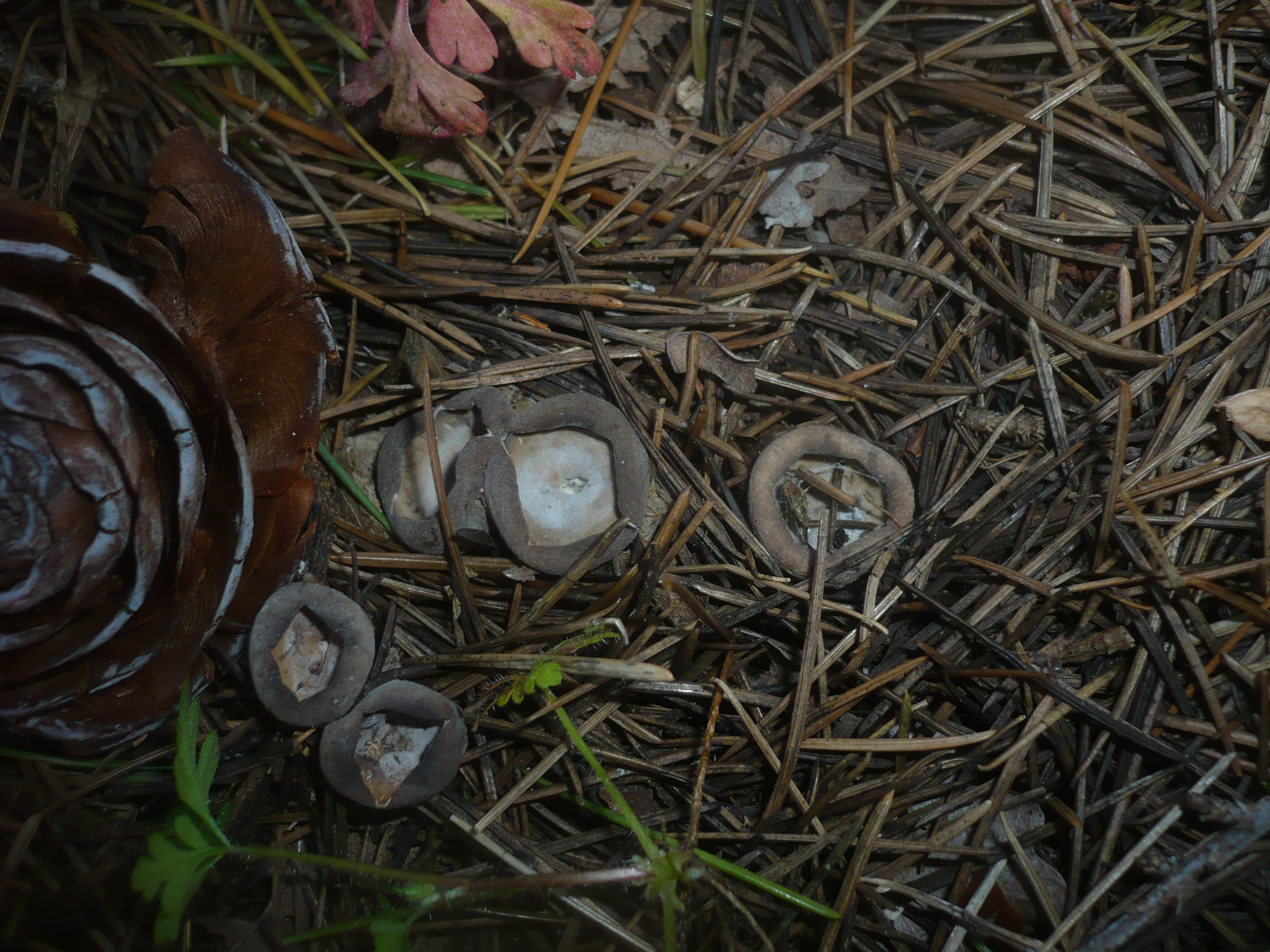
- Neournula pouchetii

Scientific classification
- Kingdom: Fungi
- Division: Ascomycota
- Class: Pezizomycetes
- Order: Pezizales
- Family: Chorioactidaceae
- Genus: Neournula; Paden & Tylutki

Type species
- Neournula nordmanensis Paden & Tylutki

Species
- N. nordmanensis N. pouchetii

= Neournula =

Genus of fungi

Neournula is a genus of fungi in the family Chorioactidaceae. There are two species in the genus, found in the US, Europe, and northern Africa. Spore examination may be necessary to distinguish the species from those of the genus Urnula.
