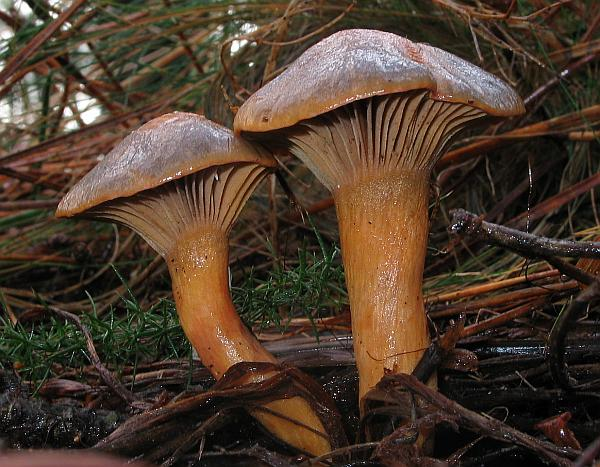

Scientific classification
- Domain: Eukaryota
- Kingdom: Fungi
- Division: Basidiomycota
- Class: Agaricomycetes
- Order: Boletales
- Family: Gomphidiaceae
- Genus: Chroogomphus
- Species: C. rutilus

Binomial name
- Chroogomphus rutilus (Schaeff.) O.K.Mill. (1964)

Synonyms
- Agaricus rutilus Schaeff. (1774); Agaricus rufescens J.F.Gmel. (1792); Cortinarius rutilus (Schaeff.) Gray (1821); Gomphidius rutilus (Schaeff.) S.Lundell (1937); Gomphidius viscidus (L.:Fr.) Fr. (1838)

= Chroogomphus rutilus =

Species of fungus

Chroogomphus rutilus, commonly known as the brown slimecap or the copper spike, is a species of fungus in the Gomphidiaceae family. First described scientifically as Agaricus rutilus by Jacob Christian Schäffer in 1774, it was transferred to the genus Chroogomphus in 1964 by Orson K. Miller, Jr. The fungus lives ectomycorrhizally with Pinus species, and is found in Europe and North America. The fruit bodies are edible but not highly regarded.

Gomphidius viscidus is an old synonym of this mushroom.
