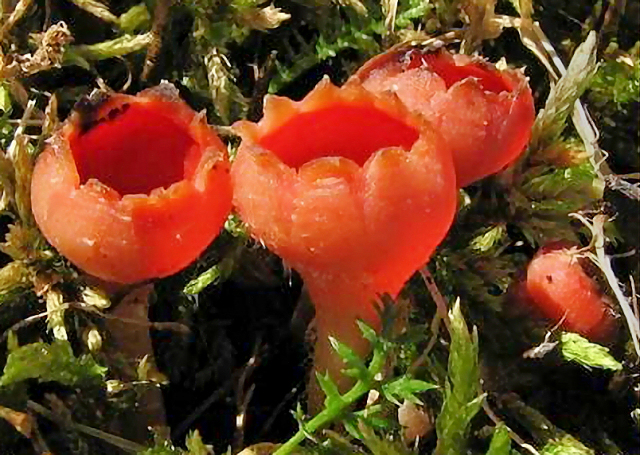

Scientific classification
- Domain: Eukaryota
- Kingdom: Fungi
- Division: Ascomycota
- Class: Pezizomycetes
- Order: Pezizales
- Family: Sarcoscyphaceae
- Genus: Microstoma
- Species: M. protractum

Binomial name
- Microstoma protractum (Fr.) Kanouse (1948)

Synonyms
- Peziza protracta Fr. (1851)

= Microstoma protractum =

Species of fungus

Microstoma protractum is a species of cup fungus in the family Sarcoscyphaceae. It was first described as a species of Peziza by Elias Magnus Fries in 1851. American mycologist Bessie B. Kanouse assigned it its current name in 1948. The fungus is found in Europe and North America, where it grows as a saprophyte on partially buried sticks and roots.
