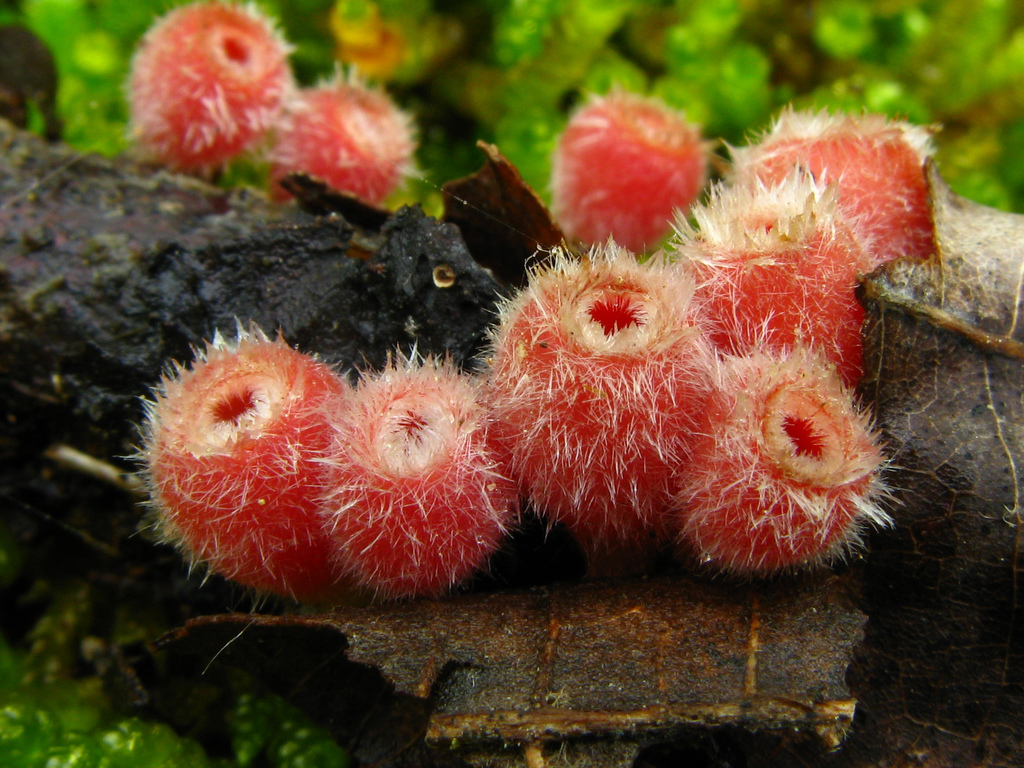
- Microstoma floccosum

Scientific classification
- Domain: Eukaryota
- Kingdom: Fungi
- Division: Ascomycota
- Class: Pezizomycetes
- Order: Pezizales
- Family: Sarcoscyphaceae
- Genus: Microstoma; Bernstein (1852)

Type species
- Microstoma hiemale Bernstein (1852)

Species
- M. aggregatum M. apiculosporum M. camerunensis M. floccosum M. hiemale M. insititium M. macrosporum M. protractum M. vulgare

Synonyms
- Anthopeziza Wettst. (1885); Articulariella Höhn. (1909); Articulis Clem. & Shear (1931)

= Microstoma (fungus) =

Genus of fungi

Microstoma is a genus of cup fungi in the order Pezizales.
