= Edel Eckblad =

Norwegian actress (1914–1994)

Edel Eckblad (26 May 1914 – 12 October 1994) was a Norwegian actress.

== Early life ==
She was the older sister of mycologist Finn-Egil Eckblad.

== Career ==
She acted out of Studioteatret from 1945 to 1950 and Riksteatret from 1951 to 1963 and 1975 to her death. Between 1963 and 1975 she was freelancing. Her filmography includes Bussen (1961) and Eddie & Suzanne (1975).
