= Ekblad =

Ekblad is a Swedish language surname.

== Geographical distribution ==
As of 2014, 59.8% of all known bearers of the surname Ekblad were residents of Sweden (frequency 1:7,028), 25.2% of the United States (1:612,290), 10.6% of Finland (1:22,164), 1.6% of Norway (1:135,325) and 1.2% of Canada (1:1,268,897).

In Sweden, the frequency of the surname was higher than national average (1:7,028) in the following counties:

1. Skåne County (1:3,183)
2. Örebro County (1:3,521)
3. Jönköping County (1:3,698)
4. Kalmar County (1:4,075)
5. Kronoberg County (1:4,557)
6. Västra Götaland County (1:6,561)

In Finland, the frequency of the surname was higher than national average (1:22,164) in the following regions:

1. Ostrobothnia (1:3,778)
2. Southwest Finland (1:7,089)
3. Åland (1:10,764)
4. Central Finland (1:11,158)
5. Uusimaa (1:16,668)

== People ==
- Aaron Ekblad (born 1996), Canadian ice hockey player
- Nils-Eric Ekblad (1904–1978), Swedish diplomat
- Stina Ekblad (born 1954), Finnish actress

== See also ==
- Ekblad Glacier, Antarctica
