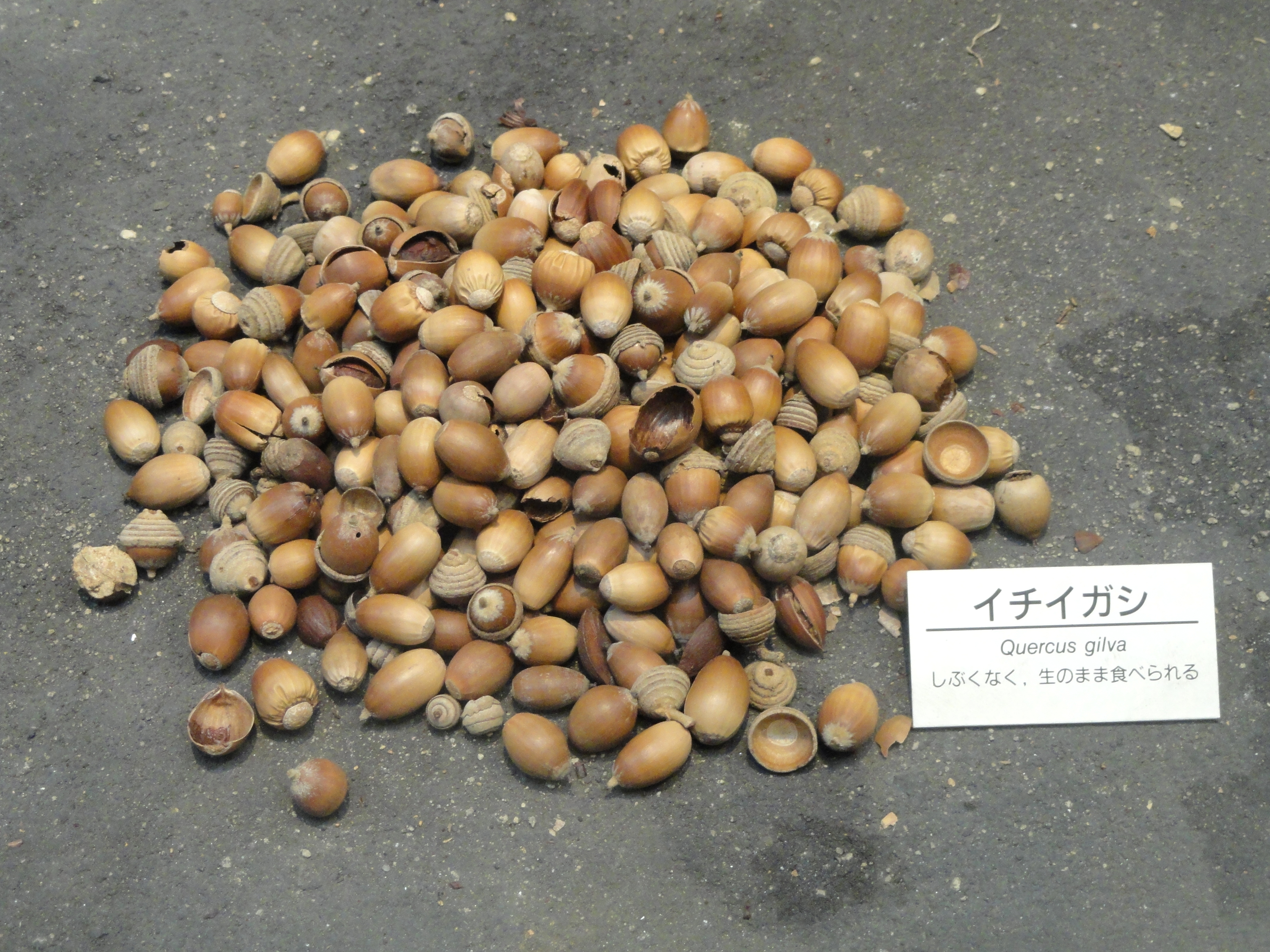
- Acorns of Quercus gilva
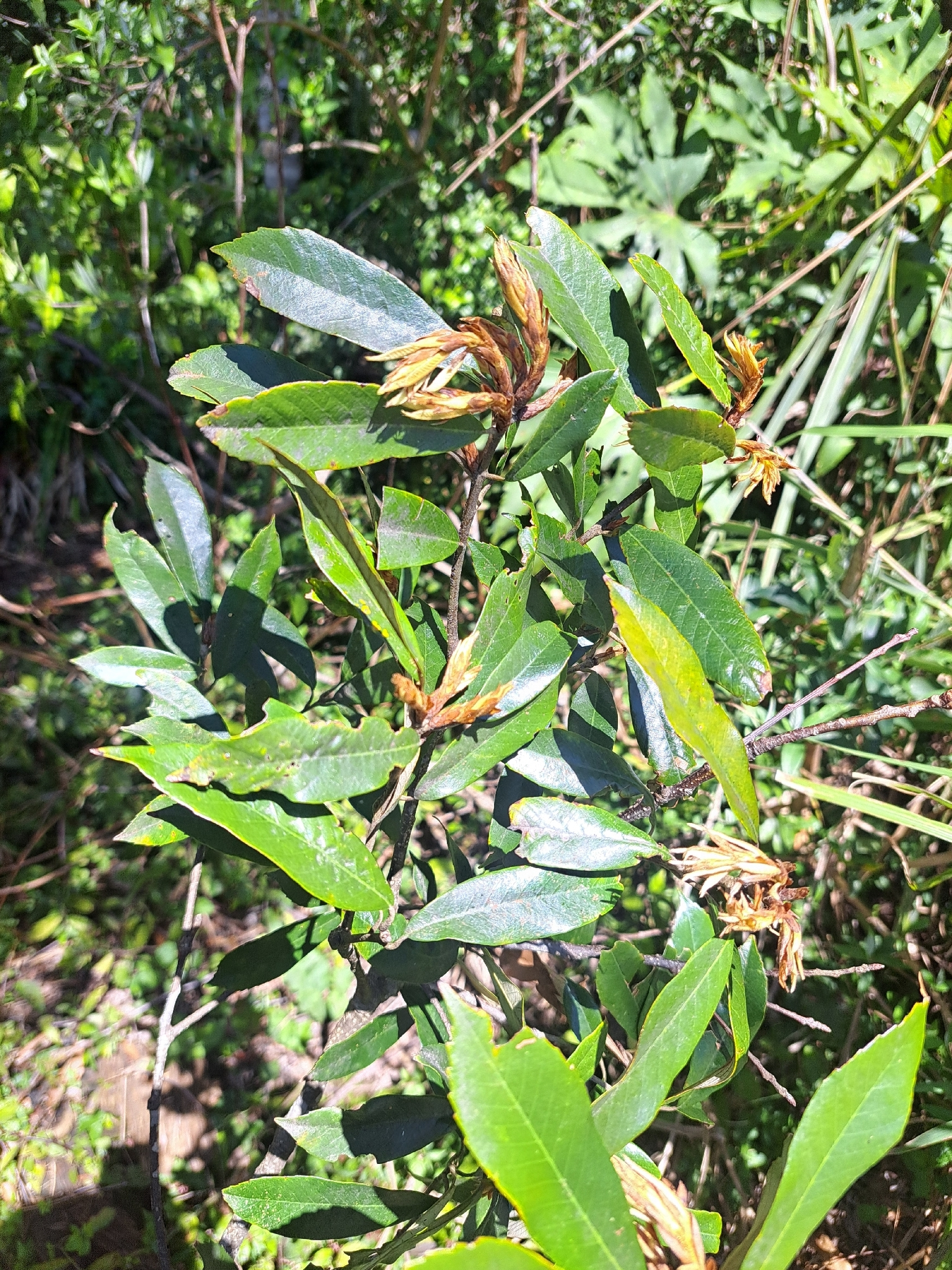
- Leaves of Quercus gilva in Taiwan.

Conservation status
- Least Concern (IUCN 3.1)

Scientific classification
- Kingdom: Plantae
- Clade: Embryophytes
- Clade: Tracheophytes
- Clade: Angiosperms
- Clade: Eudicots
- Clade: Rosids
- Order: Fagales
- Family: Fagaceae
- Genus: Quercus
- Subgenus: Quercus subg. Cerris
- Section: Quercus sect. Cyclobalanopsis
- Species: Q. gilva

Binomial name
- Quercus gilva Blume (1851)

Synonyms
- Cyclobalanopsis gilva (Blume) Oerst.; Cyclobalanopsis hunanensis (Hand.-Mazz.) W.C.Cheng & T.Hong; Quercus hunanensis Hand.-Mazz.

= Quercus gilva =

Species of oak tree

Quercus gilva, the red-bark oak, is a species of tree in the beech family Fagaceae. It has been found in Japan, Korea, Taiwan, and southeastern China (Fujian, Guangdong, Guizhou, Hunan, and Zhejiang). It is placed in subgenus Cerris, section Cyclobalanopsis.

Quercus gilva is a tree which grows to 30 meters (98 ft) tall with orangish-brown twigs. Leaves can be as much as 12 cm long (4.7 in).
