= Desmazierella =

Scientific classification
- Kingdom: Fungi
- Division: Ascomycota
- Class: Pezizomycetes
- Order: Pezizales
- Family: Sarcoscyphaceae
- Genus: Desmazierella; Lib. (1829)

Type species
- Desmazierella acicola Lib. (1829)

Species
- D. acicola D. bulgarioides D. foliicola D. melaxantha D. piceicola

Genus of fungi

Desmazierella is a genus of fungi in the family Sarcoscyphaceae. The genus was circumscribed in 1829 by Belgian mycologist Marie-Anne Libert in Ann. Sci. Nat. Paris Vol.17 on page 82 in 1829 with the type, D. acicola, as the sole species.

The genus name of Desmazierella is in honour of Jean-Baptiste Henri Joseph Desmazières (1786 - 1862), a French apothacary and botanist, who lived in Lille.
