= Finn-Egil Eckblad =

Norwegian mycologist (1923–2000)

Finn-Egil Eckblad (1923 – 2000) was a Norwegian mycologist.

== Early life and education ==
He attained a PhD in Philosophy in 1968. He was the brother of the actress Edel Eckblad.

== Career ==
In 1971, he was hired as a lecturer at the University of Bergen. Later in 1979, he was hired as a professor at the University of Oslo. He retired in 1990.
