= Orson K. Miller Jr. =

American mycologist (1930–2006)

- Born: Orson Knapp Miller Jr. December 19, 1930; Cambridge, Massachusetts, U.S.
- Died: June 9, 2006 (aged 75)
- Education: University of Massachusetts; University of Michigan (PhD)
- Spouse: Hope Hartigan Miller (m. 1953)
- Children: 3
- Scientific career
- Fields: Mycology

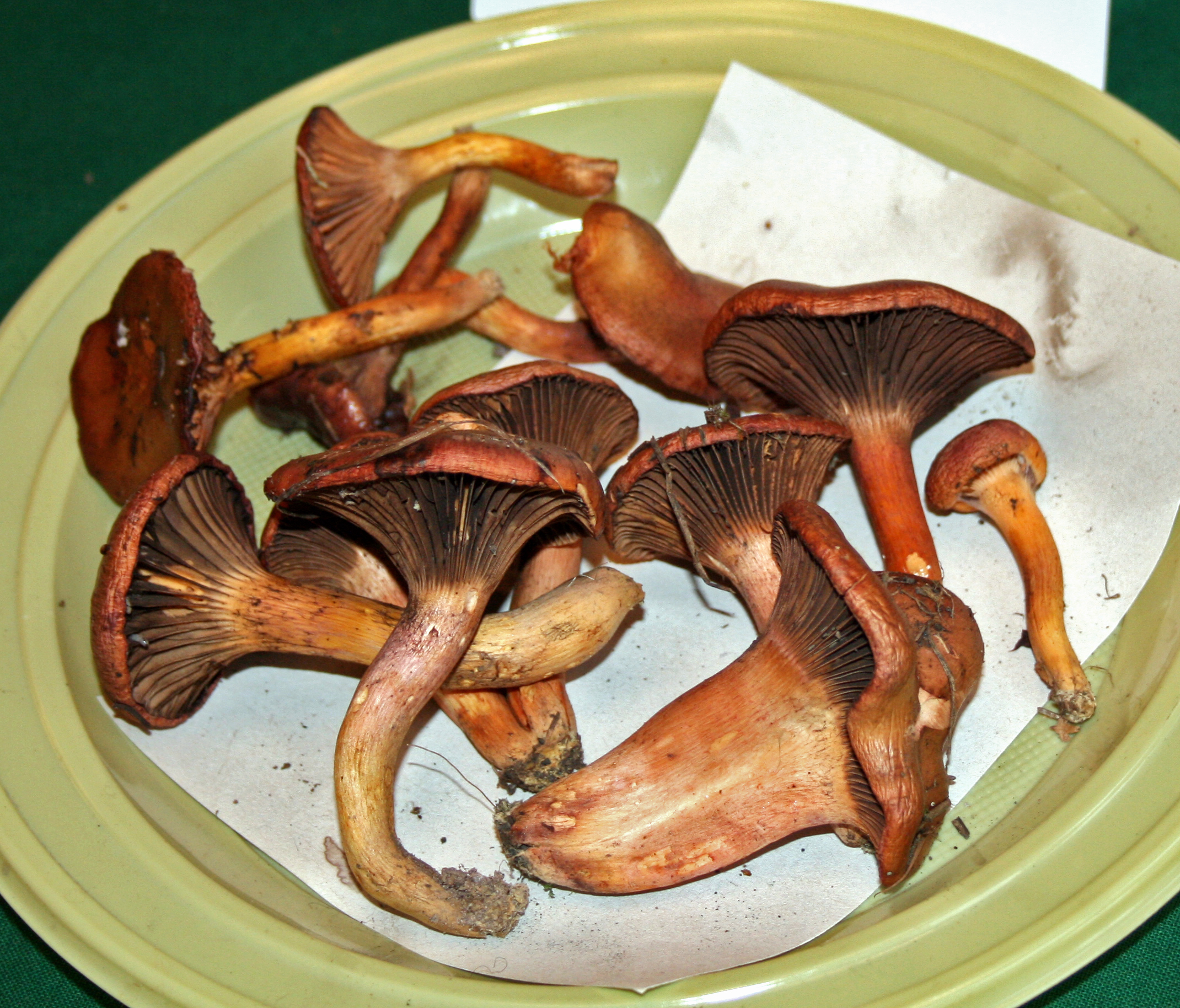
Chroogomphus rutilus, the type species of mushroom in a genus erected by Miller

Orson Knapp Miller Jr. (December 19, 1930 – June 9, 2006) was an American mycologist. He published numerous papers in mycology and was responsible for the naming of many taxa, as well as being one of the authors erecting the genus Chroogomphus. He described Omphalotus olivascens, several species of Amanita, and the ghoul fungus Hebeloma aminophilum.

He married Hope Hartigan Miller in 1953; both were mycologists and published books, including at least one together. Hope died on September 26, 2018.

== Works ==
His books include:

- Mushrooms of North America (1972) ISBN 978-0525161653
- Gasteromycetes: Morphological and Developmental Features with Keys to the Orders, Families, and Genera (1988) ISBN 978-0916422745
- North American Mushrooms: A Field Guide to Edible and Inedible Fungi (2006) ISBN 978-0762731091 (with Hope H. Miller)

== Awards and honors ==
He received the William H. Weston Award for Teaching Excellence in Mycology, and the Distinguished Mycologist Award. Several fungus species have been named in his honor, including:

- Amanita orsonii Ash.Kumar & T.N. Lakh. (1990)
- Clitocybe milleri H.E.Bigelow (1985)
- Crepidotus milleri Hesler & A.H.Sm. (1965)
- Entoloma milleri Noordel. (2004)
- Pholiota milleri A.H. Sm. & Hesler (1968)
- Plectania milleri Paden & Tylutki (1969)
- Tylopilus orsonianus Fulgenzi & T.W.Henkel (2007)
