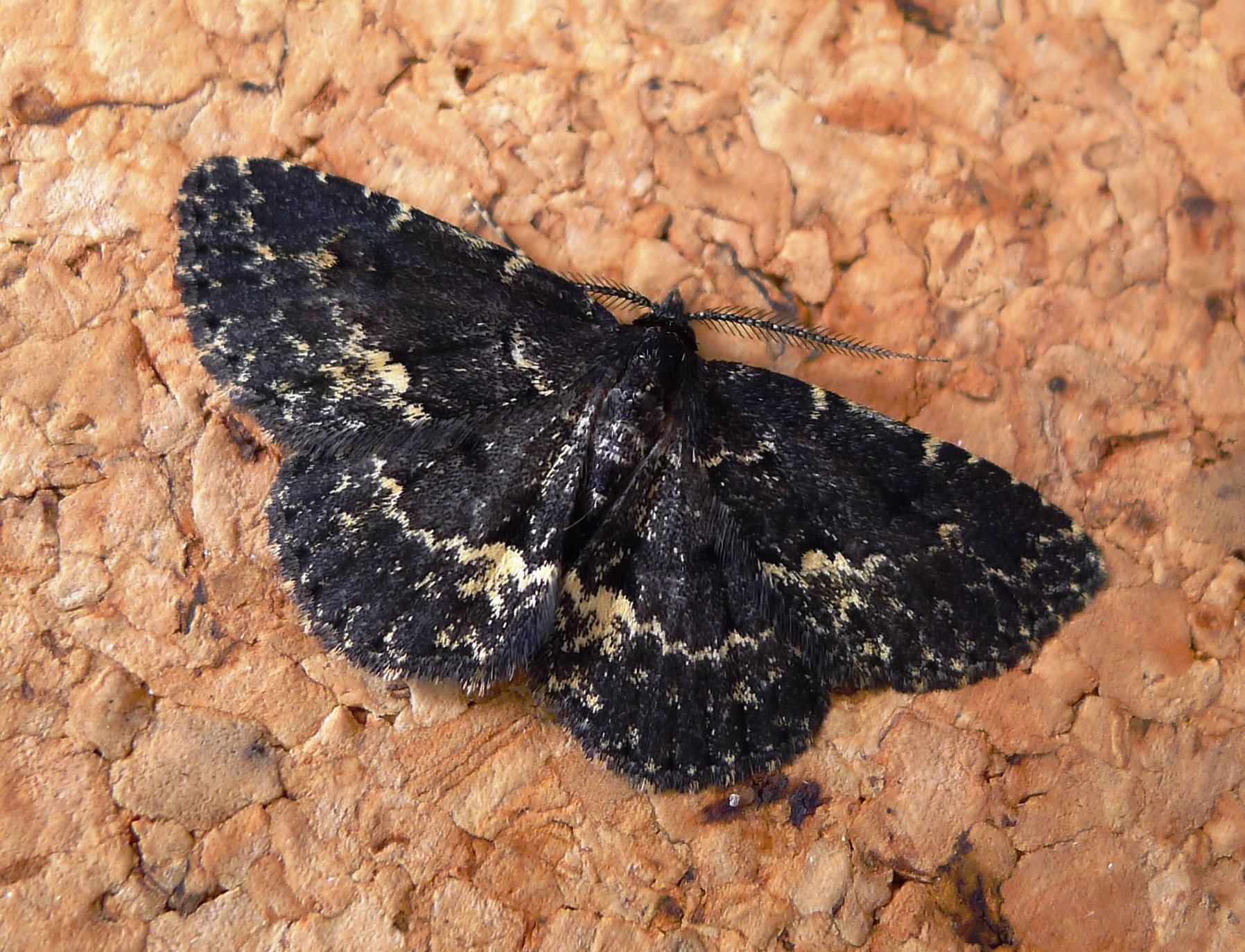

Scientific classification
- Kingdom: Animalia
- Phylum: Arthropoda
- Clade: Pancrustacea
- Class: Insecta
- Order: Lepidoptera
- Superfamily: Noctuoidea
- Family: Erebidae
- Genus: Parascotia
- Species: P. fuliginaria

Binomial name
- Parascotia fuliginaria (Linnaeus, 1761)

Synonyms
- Parascotia mineta Franclemont, 1985

= Parascotia fuliginaria =

Species of moth

Parascotia fuliginaria, the waved black moth, is a species of moth of the family Erebidae. It is found in Europe as far east as the Ural Mountains, in Armenia and Asia Minor, and is an introduced species in North America.

This species is associated with damp woodlands, especially those with high densities of fungus or dead wood. Larvae eat fungi, lichens, and decaying wood. Adult P. fuliginaria fly through summer and are active at night. The moth is scarce in some parts of its range, but in Britain it remains nationally secure. Publication of a chromosome-level assemblage of its genome gives a general insight into the genomics and genetics of the waved black moth.

== Technical description and variation ==
P. fuliginaria L. forewing blackish fuscous; lines yellowish ochreous, edged with black; the outer dentate, the subterminal waved; a black mark at end of cell; hindwing like forewing; — the ab. flava Horm., from the Bukowina, has in the male quite pale ochreous wings, with two blackish fasciae in middle of wing and almost obsolete terminal spots; the female is pale yellowish brown, with darker dusting, especially in the basal and terminal areas; — ab. carbonaria Esp. is wholly black. Larva black; dorsal stripe white, swollen in places, with a black line in middle; several fine, interrupted, wavy, whitish lateral lines; tubercles large, with long hairs, those on the sides and the hind pair on each dorsal segment orange; head black, with yellow lines. The wingspan is 18–28 mm. The length of the forewing is 11–14 mm.

== Life cycle ==
=== Egg ===
Due to the moth's feeding preferences of fungi, lichens, and decaying wood, P. fuliginaria eggs are laid on dead wood, as close to larval food sources as possible.

=== Larvae ===
P. fuliginaria feed in the fall and winter and overwinter as larvae. Known fungal hosts include: Fomitopsis betulina, Trametes versicolor, Botryobasidium spp., Piptoporus betulinus, Daldinia concentrica, Phaeolus schweinitzii, Cylindrobasidium laeve, Tapinella pauoides, Cladonia fimbriata, Stereum hirsutum, and various bracket fungi. They also feed on lichens and slime molds.

The larval stage of this moth is black with a white dorsal stripe, faint white lateral lines, orange tubercles, and a black head with a yellow mark.

Pupae

The moth pupates from mid-June to August. It pupates within a cocoon made of wood and silk fragments.

=== Adult ===
Adults fly from June to July in the first generation. Occasionally, if a second generation manifests, they fly in September or possibly October depending on locations.

Adult P. fuliginaria consume sugary secretions such as sap from trees, or nectar. They are active from sunset onwards, and are a nocturnal species, but come out when attracted by light and sugar.

The waved black moth resides in cooler locations during summer as temperatures increase. Although not consistently associated with cave-dwelling, the moth periodically chooses diurnal shelter deep in caves.

Adult P. fuliginaria are small and dark with a wingspan of 18-28 millimeters, and a forewing length of 11-14 millimeters. The posture when it rests is similar to geometrid moths, unlike Erebidae, instead the waved black moth presses its wings against a tree or wall.

== Genomics and genetics ==
The genome size of P. fuliginaria is 541.60 megabases. It contains 32 chromosome pairs, including Z and W sex chromosomes, 18,264 protein-coding genes with an average of 5.38 exons per gene, and 18,432 transcripts with an average transcript length of 6,553 base pairs. The mitochondrial genome consists of 15.47 kilobases.

DNA barcoding is prominent in North American Noctuoidea research. The DNA barcode of the waved black moth allowed it to be successfully identifiable from a dataset of over thirty-thousand sequences comprising 1,541 Canadian noctuoid species. The research revealed P. fuliginaria to be newly introduced to the country and extremely rare.

== Biomass ==
P. fuliginaria are generally low in abundance in Europe and Asia, and have limited distribution. The perception of their rarity is subjective, since these moths can be commonly spotted in regions of Belgium or Britain, though they have been recognized as nationally scarce on a global scale. From 1993 to 2019, there was an observed increase in the abundance of P. fuliginaria, for one group alone but compared to other moths, this positive trend is relatively less significant.

No definitive conclusions about this moths population can be made. According to county moth records, P. fuliginaria may be highly localized where they are still not nationally threatened. Norfolk Moths interpret moth scarcity as numbers summed after recent migration, therefore, no global or national representation of the waved black moth's population should be made based on local rarity.

This species is statistically rare compared to other moths. In an experiment involving bait trapping in local areas of Northern European sites of southern Estonia, 385 moths of multiple species were captured. Only 6 individual moths belonged to the P. fuliginaria species, constituting for less than one percent of the trapped moths.

P. fuliginaria exhibit greater activity in warmer temperatures and lower activity in higher humidity, indicating that there is a greater possibility they could be spotted during warm and dry climates. Warmer temperatures are speculated to be optimal for the species as they result in larger body sizes.

== Distribution and habitat ==
P. fuliginaria can be found in the southern half of England and Wales, with the British range labeling the moth's locality. Other sightings of this moth are records of migration, such as in Canada where they have just been introduced. In continental Europe, the moth is more abundant, recognized as fairly common in Belgium.

Specifically, P. fuliginaria is significantly active in damp woodland habitats or suburban habitats. Norfolk Moths find the waved black moth to reside primarily in wooded, damp, and boggy areas, with some moths straying into rural gardens. The most suitable location for prosperity would be environments with rotten timber, or birch log piles and other substrates that can support the association of the moth with fungi, lichens and dead wood.

== Conservation and endangerment status ==
According to Nature Spot, the red list identifies the moth as "Least Concern" and common under Great Britain status, this pushed the label of "Nationally Scarce B" as a former status list. Since the moth is seen as a possible migrant to Norfolk, Canada, and parts of Europe outside the British range, it's abundance in local areas is limited.

The Catalogue of Lepidoptera of Belgium, P. fuliginaria is common and listed as "Least Concern" for Flanders under the IUCN Red List category, indicating and supporting the fact that the moth's scarcity varies based on locality and cannot be positively considered threatened on a national or global scale.
