= Phaeolus hispidoides =

Scientific classification
- Kingdom: Fungi
- Division: Basidiomycota
- Class: Agaricomycetes
- Order: Polyporales
- Family: Phaeolaceae
- Genus: Phaeolus
- Species: P. hispidoides

Binomial name
- Phaeolus hispidoides (Peck) D.W. Li, Y.C. Dai, Patricia O. Kaishian & Yuan Yuan

Synonyms
- Polyporus hispidoides Peck

Species of fungus

Phaeolus hispidoides is a species of fungus in the family Phaeolaceae.

== Description ==
Phaeolus hispidoides is a dark, large fungus.
