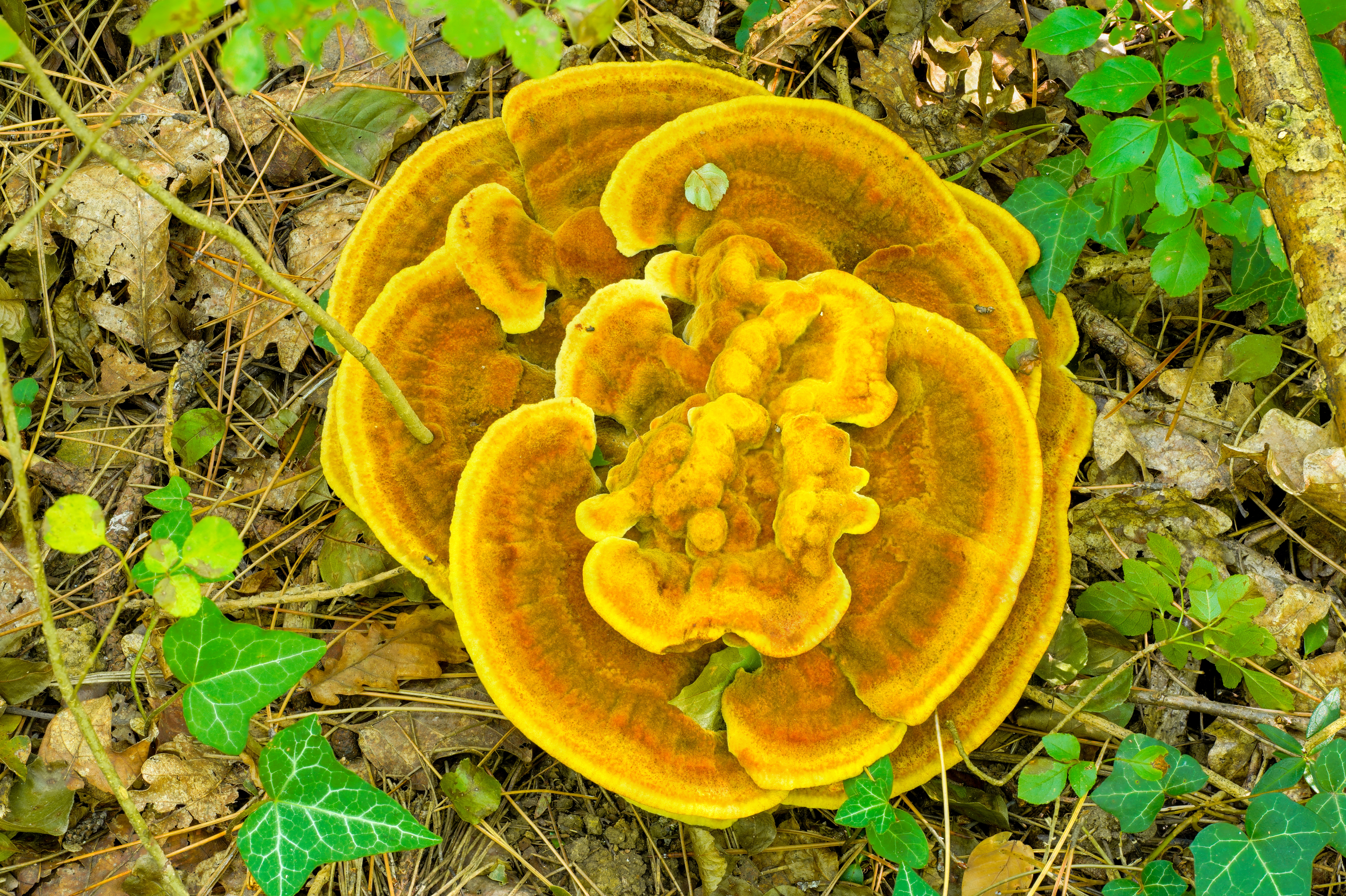

Scientific classification
- Kingdom: Fungi
- Division: Basidiomycota
- Class: Agaricomycetes
- Order: Polyporales
- Family: Phaeolaceae
- Genus: Phaeolus
- Species: P. schweinitzii

Binomial name
- Phaeolus schweinitzii (Fr.) Pat. (1900)

= Phaeolus schweinitzii =

Species of fungus

Phaeolus schweinitzii
- Mycological characteristics
- Pores on hymenium
- Cap is offset
- Hymenium is decurrent
- Stipe is bare
- Spore print is white to yellow
- Ecology is saprotrophic or parasitic
- Edibility is inedible

Phaeolus schweinitzii, commonly known as velvet-top fungus, dyer's polypore, dyer's mazegill, or pine dye polypore, is a fungal plant pathogen.

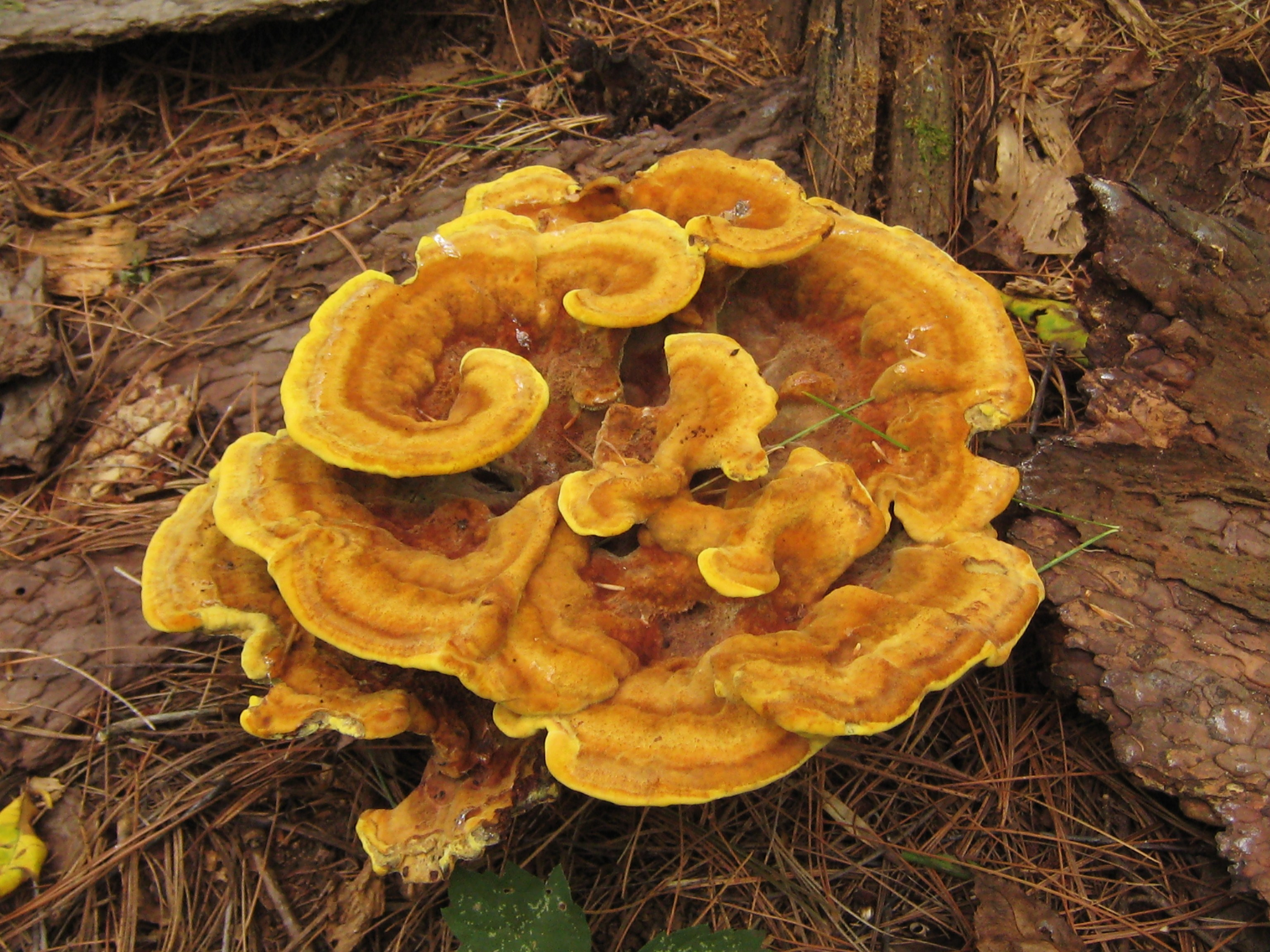
A large Phaeolus schweinitzii

== Taxonomy ==
P. schweinitzii is named after Lewis David de Schweinitz, a Pennsylvania-born Moravian minister and important early American mycologist.

== Description ==
P. schweinitzii is a polypore, although unlike bracket fungi the fruiting body may appear terrestrial when growing from the roots or base of the host tree.

The fruiting bodies, appearing in late summer or fall, commonly incorporate blades of grass, twigs, or fallen pine needles as they grow. They are tannish with darker brown centres, with orange to pale margins on young specimens. They may grow beyond 25 centimetres (10 in) in diameter. As the fruiting bodies age, the pore surface turns from yellow to greenish yellow, the top becomes darker, and the yellow-brown flesh becomes harder and more wood-like. The pores bruise brown. The spores are white, elliptical, smooth, and inamyloid.

The effect, impact and significance of infection by this fungus is rooted in the fact that it causes brown rot, which degrades the cellulose. Thus there is a loss of tensile strength which often leads to brittle fracture near the stem base, even at a fairly early stage of decay. Decay initiated above ground can lead to branch snap or breakout.

=== Similar species ===
Similar species include Heterobasidion irregulare, H. occidentale, Inonotus dryophilus, and Onnia tomentosa.

== Habitat and distribution ==
P. schweinitzii causes butt rot on conifers such as Douglas-fir, spruce, fir, hemlock, pine, and larch. It is native to Eurasia, and has been identified as an exotic species in New Zealand, Australia, and South Africa.

== Uses ==
As its common name suggests, the dyer's polypore is an excellent natural source of green, yellow, gold, or brown dye, depending on the material dyed and the mordant used.

The species is not edible.
