= Tapinella =

Tapinella may refer to:

- Tapinella (insect), a psocoptera genus in the family Pachytroctidae
- Tapinella (fungus), a fungal genus in the family Tapinellaceae
