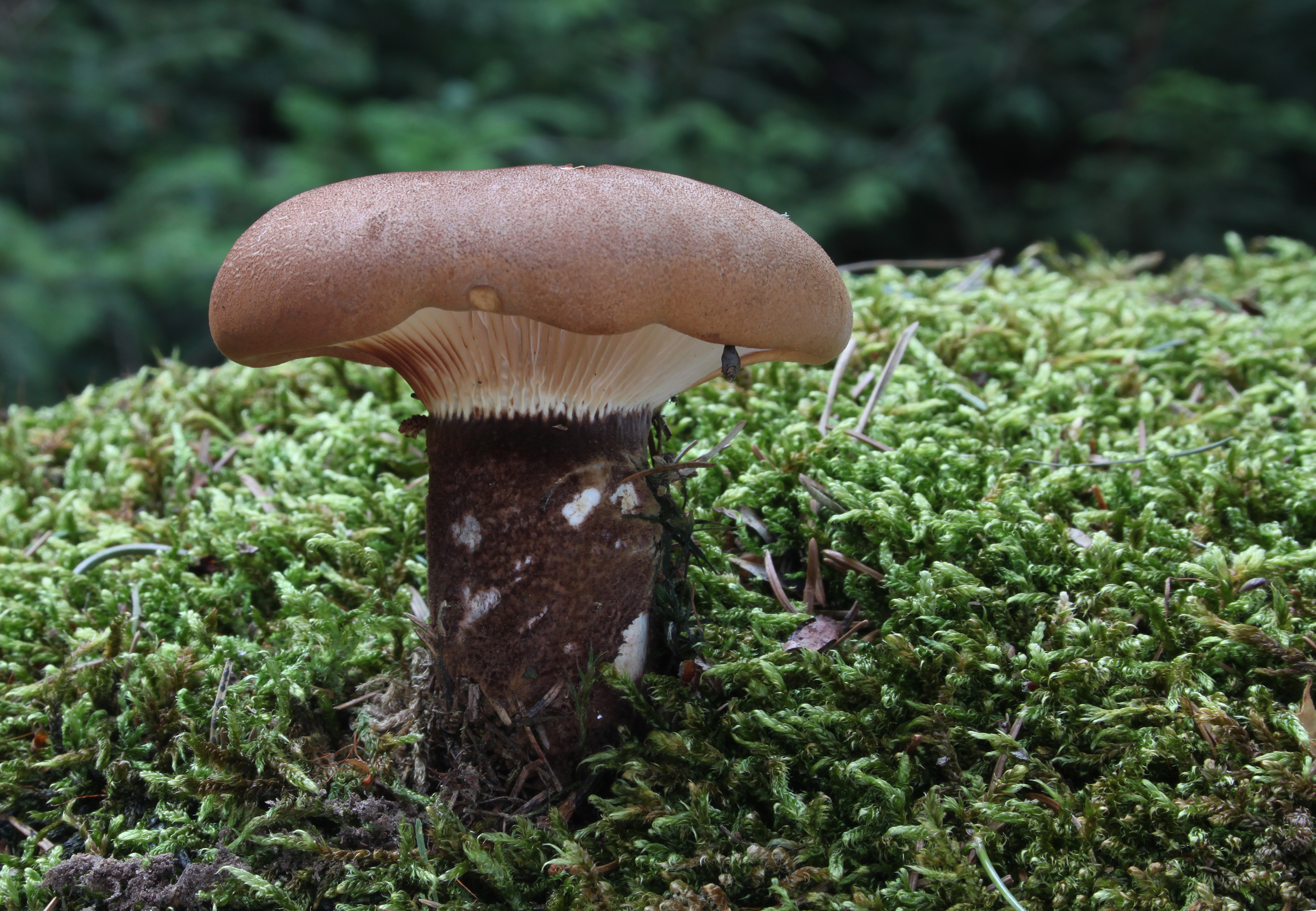

Scientific classification
- Kingdom: Fungi
- Division: Basidiomycota
- Class: Agaricomycetes
- Order: Boletales
- Family: Tapinellaceae
- Genus: Tapinella
- Species: T. atrotomentosa

Binomial name
- Tapinella atrotomentosa (Batsch) Šutara (1992)

Synonyms
- Agaricus atrotomentosus Batsch (1783); Paxillus atrotomentosus (Batsch) Fr. (1833); Rhymovis atrotomentosa (Batsch) Rabenh. (1844); Sarcopaxillus atrotomentosus (Batsch) Zmitr. (2004)

= Tapinella atrotomentosa =

Species of fungus

Tapinella atrotomentosa
- Mycological characteristics
- Gills on hymenium
- Cap is depressed
- Hymenium is decurrent
- Stipe is bare
- Spore print is buff
- Ecology is saprotrophic
- Edibility is inedible

Tapinella atrotomentosa, commonly known as the velvet roll-rim or velvet-footed tap, is a species of fungus in the family Tapinellaceae. Although it has gills, it is a member of the pored mushroom order Boletales. August Batsch described the species in 1783. It has been recorded from Eurasia and North America. Tough and inedible, it grows on tree stumps of conifers. The mushroom contains several compounds that act as deterrents of feeding by insects.

== Taxonomy ==
Tapinella atrotomentosa was originally described as Agaricus atrotomentosus by German naturalist August Batsch in his 1783 work Elenchus Fungorum, and given its current name by Josef Šutara in 1992. It is commonly known as the "velvet-footed pax", and the "velvet rollrim". Historical synonyms include Paxillus atrotomentosus by Elias Magnus Fries (1833), Rhymovis atrotomentosa by Gottlob Ludwig Rabenhorst (1844), and Sarcopaxillus atrotomentosus by Ivan Zmitrovich (2004). The variety bambusinus was described from Trinidad in 1951 by British mycologists Richard Eric Defoe Baker and William Thomas Dale.

The species name is derived from the Latin words atrotomentosus, meaning "black-haired". It is still commonly seen under its old name Paxillus atrotomentosus in guidebooks. Tapinella atrotomentosa and its relative T. panuoides were placed in a separate genus Tapinella on account of their habit of growing on (and rotting) wood, and microscopic differences including much smaller spore size, lack of cystidia, and differing basidia. Their off-centre stipe also distinguished them from other members of the genus Paxillus, and genetic analysis confirmed them as only distantly related.

== Description ==
The fruit body is squat mushroom with a cap up to 20 cm (8 in) wide, sepia- or walnut brown in colour with a rolled rim and depressed centre. The gills are cream-yellow and forked. The thick stipe juts out sidewards from the mushroom; it is up to 12 cm long and dark brown, covered with dark brown velvety fur.

The flesh is yellowish, and has been described as appetising in appearance, and is little affected by insects; the taste however is acrid. The spore print is yellowish to brownish and the spores are round to oval, measuring 5–6 μm long.

== Distribution and habitat ==
It is a saprobic fungus found growing on tree stumps of conifers in North America, Europe, Central America (Costa Rica), east into Asia where it has been recorded from Pakistan and China. The fruit bodies appear in summer and autumn, even in drier spells when other mushrooms are not evident.

== Toxicity ==
The mushrooms are not generally considered edible, but have been used as a food source in parts of eastern Europe. The species contains toxins which may cause gastrointestinal upset. There have been cases of poisoning reported in European literature. Linus Zeitlmayr reports that young mushrooms are edible, but warns than older ones have a foul bitter or inky flavour and are possibly poisonous. The bitter flavour is allegedly improved by boiling the mushrooms and discarding the water, but is indigestible to many.

Tests on the chemical composition and free amino acid levels of the mushroom suggest that they are not considerably different from other edible gilled mushrooms such as Armillaria mellea.

== Chemistry ==
Tapinella atrotomentosa has a wound-activated defence mechanism whereby injured fruit bodies convert chemicals known as leucomentins into atromentin, butenolide, and the feeding deterrent osmundalactone. Atromentin had previously been identified as the pigment producing the brown colour of the cap, but was not characterized as a chemical defence compound until 1989. Other compounds produced by the fungus include the orange-yellow flavomentins and violet spiromentin pigments. A novel dimeric lactone, bis-osumundalactone, was isolated from the variety bambusinus.

Several phytoecdysteroids (compounds related to the insect moulting hormone ecdysteroid) have been identified from the fungus, including paxillosterone, 20,22-p-hydroxybenzylidene acetal, atrotosterones A, B, and C, and 25-hydroxyatrotosterones A and B.
