= Tapinella maculata =

Scientific classification
- Domain: Eukaryota
- Kingdom: Animalia
- Phylum: Arthropoda
- Class: Insecta
- Order: Psocodea
- Family: Pachytroctidae
- Genus: Tapinella
- Species: T. maculata

Binomial name
- Tapinella maculata Mockford & Gurney, 1956

Species of booklouse

Tapinella maculata is a species of thick barklouse in the family Pachytroctidae. It is found in the Caribbean Sea, Central America, North America, and South America.
