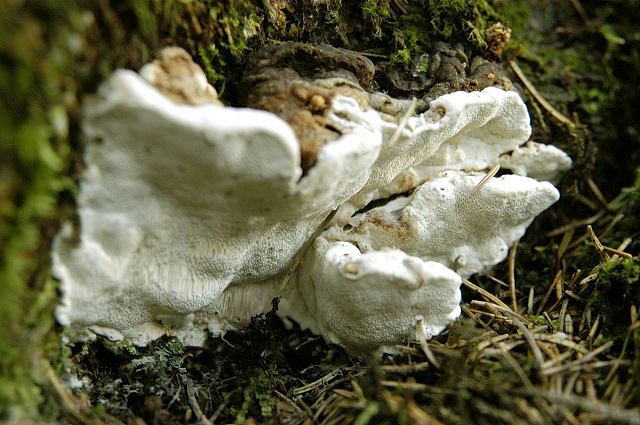
- Heterobasidion annosum

Scientific classification
- Domain: Eukaryota
- Kingdom: Fungi
- Division: Basidiomycota
- Class: Agaricomycetes
- Order: Russulales
- Family: Bondarzewiaceae
- Genus: Heterobasidion; Bref. (1888)

Type species
- Heterobasidion annosum (Fr.) Bref. (1888)

Species
- H. abietinum H. amyloideum H. annosum H. araucariae H. arbitrarium H. australe H. ecrustosum H. insulare sensu typi H. irregulare H. linzhiense H. occidentale H. orientale H. pahangense H. parviporum H. rutilantiforme H. tibeticum

= Heterobasidion =

Genus of fungi

Heterobasidion is a genus of basidiomycetes in the family of Bondarzewiaceae. Species in this genus include tree decay fungi that may be pathogenic and cause deterioration of tree health including mortality. Fungi in the genus produce shelf-like polyporous fruiting bodies that release spores from pores. Mating studies in the late twentieth century and genetic studies in the early twenty-first century have led to description of several new species and replacement of some of the original names. As a result, two former Heterobasidion species, H. annosum and H. insulare, are now recognized to each comprise multiple distinct species.

== Heterobasidion annosum sensu lato ==
Heterobasidion annosum sensu lato is a collection of the several species that cause Heterobasidion root disease and butt rot of forest trees and occasionally those in landscape plantings across the Northern Hemisphere. These fungi can be saprotrophic or necrotrophic, colonizing nonliving heartwood or living roots. Numerous tree species have been identified as hosts, but evergreen trees such as pine are most commonly affected. Heterobasidion root disease and butt rot are a serious issues to forest health due to tree mortality, decreased lumber volume and quality, and lessened carbon sequestration. This group of species include some of the most intensively studied forest tree pathogens, becoming the first basidiomycete forest pathogen to have its genome sequenced in 2012.

Heterobasidion annosum sensu lato includes five species, which differ in host preference, genetics, morphology, and geographic range. Sexual mating tests have identified three inter-sterility groups: P, S, and F, named after their chief hosts (pine, spruce, and fir). The five species are H. abietinum (F-type), H. annosum sensu stricto (P-type), H. irregulare (P-type), H. occidentale (S-type), and H. parviporum (S-type). Genetic analysis have demonstrated the North American species, H. irregulare and H. occidentale, are distinct from each other and the European species within their inter-sterility groups.

== Heterobasidion insulare ==
The H. insulare complex comprises seven Heterobasidion species present in Eastern Asia and India. These are primarily saprotrophic decay fungi that are rarely pathogenic. These fungi are found on stumps and logs of are evergreen forest tree species including pines, firs, cedars, and spruces. Some species of this fungal complex can be easily differentiated from H. annosum sensu lato due to the red coloration on the top surface of the fruiting body.

Once considered a single species, the H. insulare complex is now considered to comprise six distinct species based on results of morphological studies, intersterility trials, and genetis. Mating tests have identified four inter-sterility groups: N, T, Y, and Z. The seven species are H. orientale (N-type), H. ecrustosum (T-type), H. insulare sensu typi, H. linzhiense, H. australe, H. amyloideum, H. tibeticum (Z-type).

== Heterobasidion araucariae ==
Heterobasidion araucariae is a saprotrophic decay fungi found in Australia, Oceania, and may be present in Indochina. While not considered pathogenic it can help decay logs and stumps of Agathis, Araucaria, and Pine species.

== Other Species ==
There are three isolates that have been proposed as new species but further description may be necessary.

- Heterobasidion pahangense Corner
- Heterobasidion rutilantiforme (Murrill) Stalpers
- Heterobasidion arbitrarium Corner
