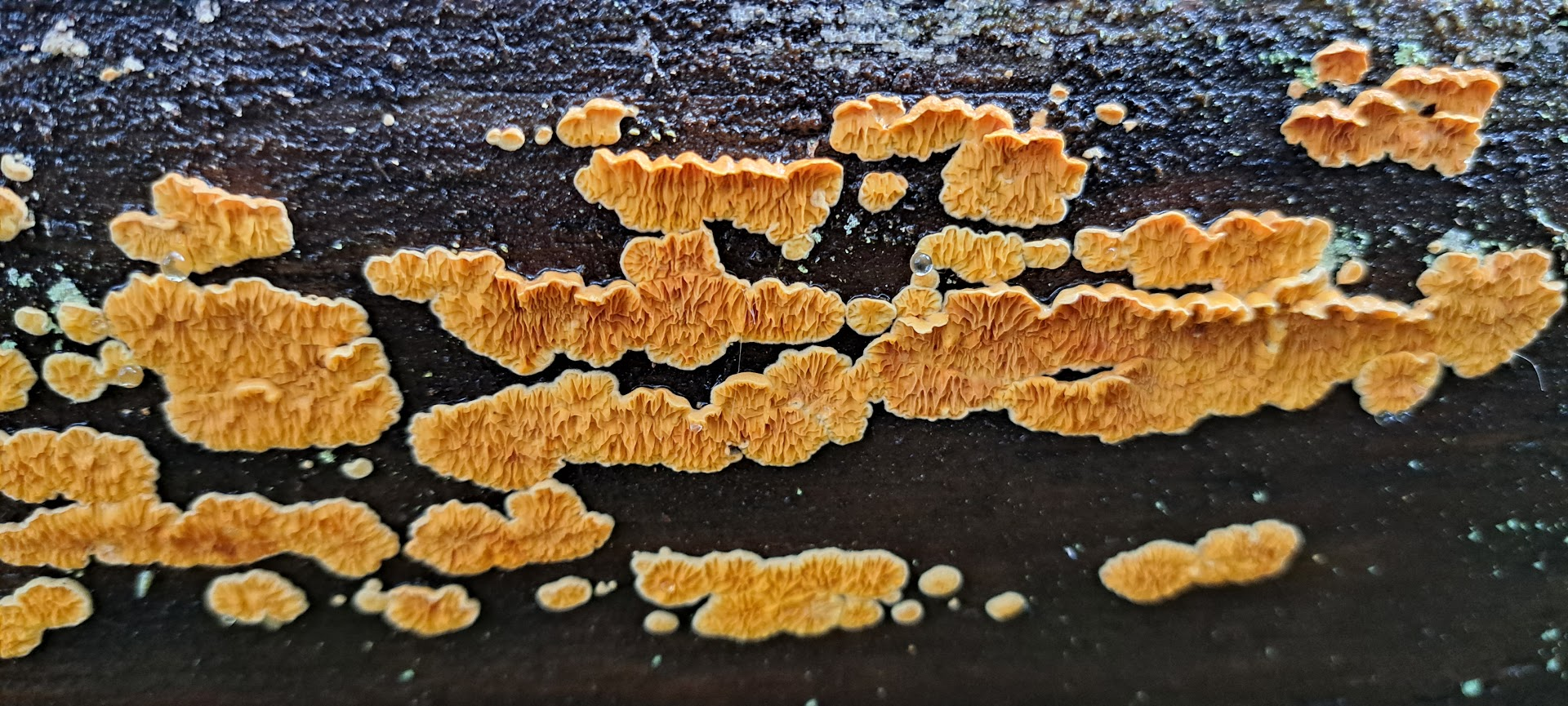
- Pseudomerulius aureus

Scientific classification
- Kingdom: Fungi
- Division: Basidiomycota
- Class: Agaricomycetes
- Order: Boletales
- Family: Tapinellaceae
- Genus: Pseudomerulius; Jülich

Type species
- Pseudomerulius aureus (Fr.) Jülich

Species
- P. aureus; P. montanus

= Pseudomerulius =

Genus of fungi

Pseudomerulius is a genus of fungi in the Tapinellaceae family. The genus is widespread and contains two species. P. aureus is noted as being inedible.
