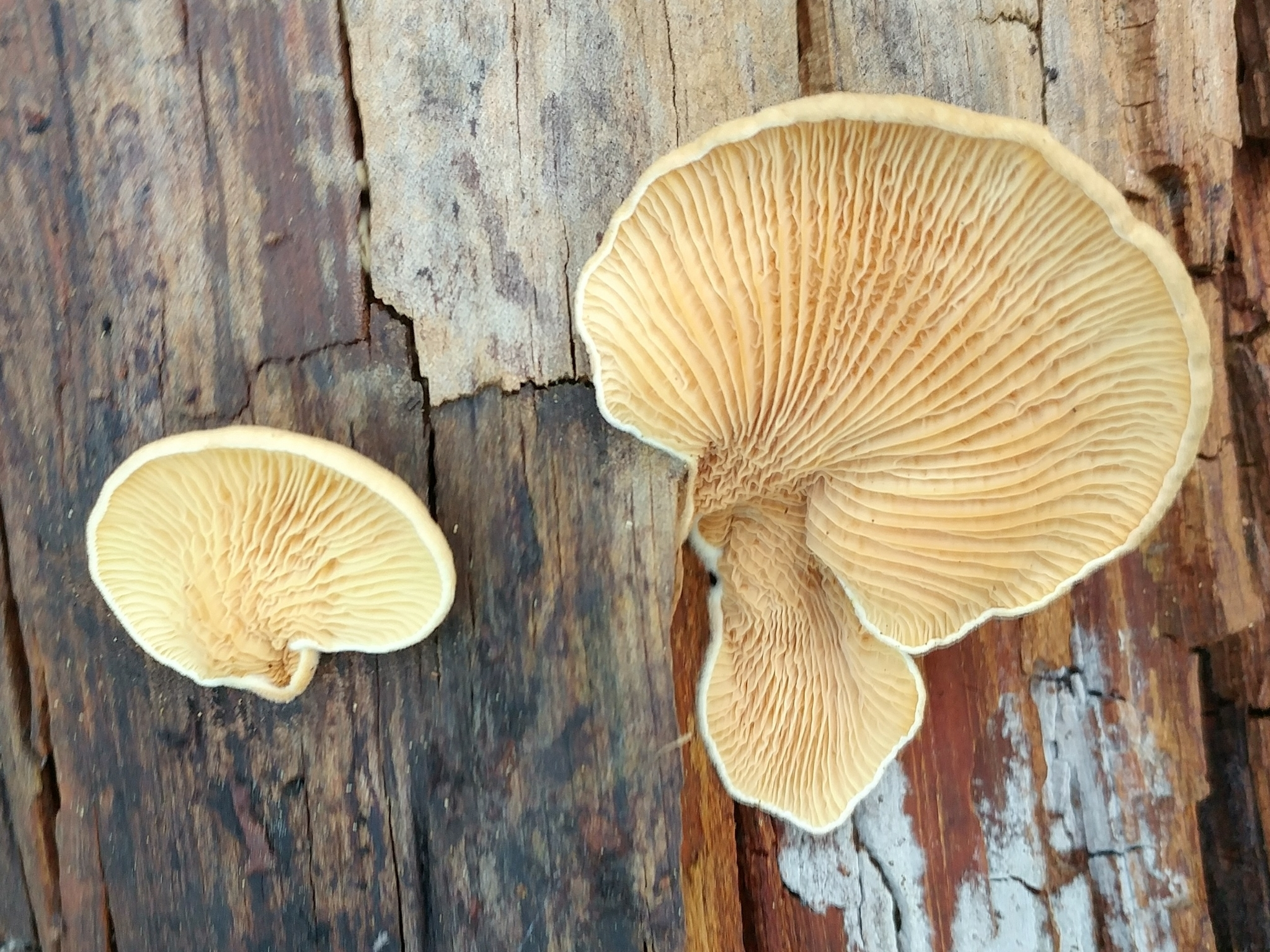
- Tapinella panuoides

Scientific classification
- Kingdom: Fungi
- Division: Basidiomycota
- Class: Agaricomycetes
- Order: Boletales
- Family: Tapinellaceae
- Genus: Tapinella
- Species: T. panuoides

Binomial name
- Tapinella panuoides (Batsch) E.-J.Gilbert 1931; Les Livres du Mycologue Tome I-IV, Tom. III: Les Bolets: 68 (1931)

Subspecies
- Tapinella panuoides var. ionipus (Quélet 1888) C.Hahn 1999

Synonyms
- Paxillus panuoides

= Tapinella panuoides =

Species of fungus

Tapinella panuoides
- Mycological characteristics
- Gills on hymenium
- No distinct cap
- Hymenium is decurrent
- Stipe is bare or lacks a stipe
- Spore print is yellow to brown
- Ecology is saprotrophic
- Edibility is poisonous

Tapinella panuoides, also known as oyster rollrim and as fan pax from its former binomial Paxillus panuoides, is a species of fungus in the genus Tapinella.

== Description ==
The mushroom has little or no stalk where it emerges from the substrate, with caps up to 10 centimetres (4 in) across. The gills appear to be crimped, forked, or crosshatched close to the base. The spore print is ochre.

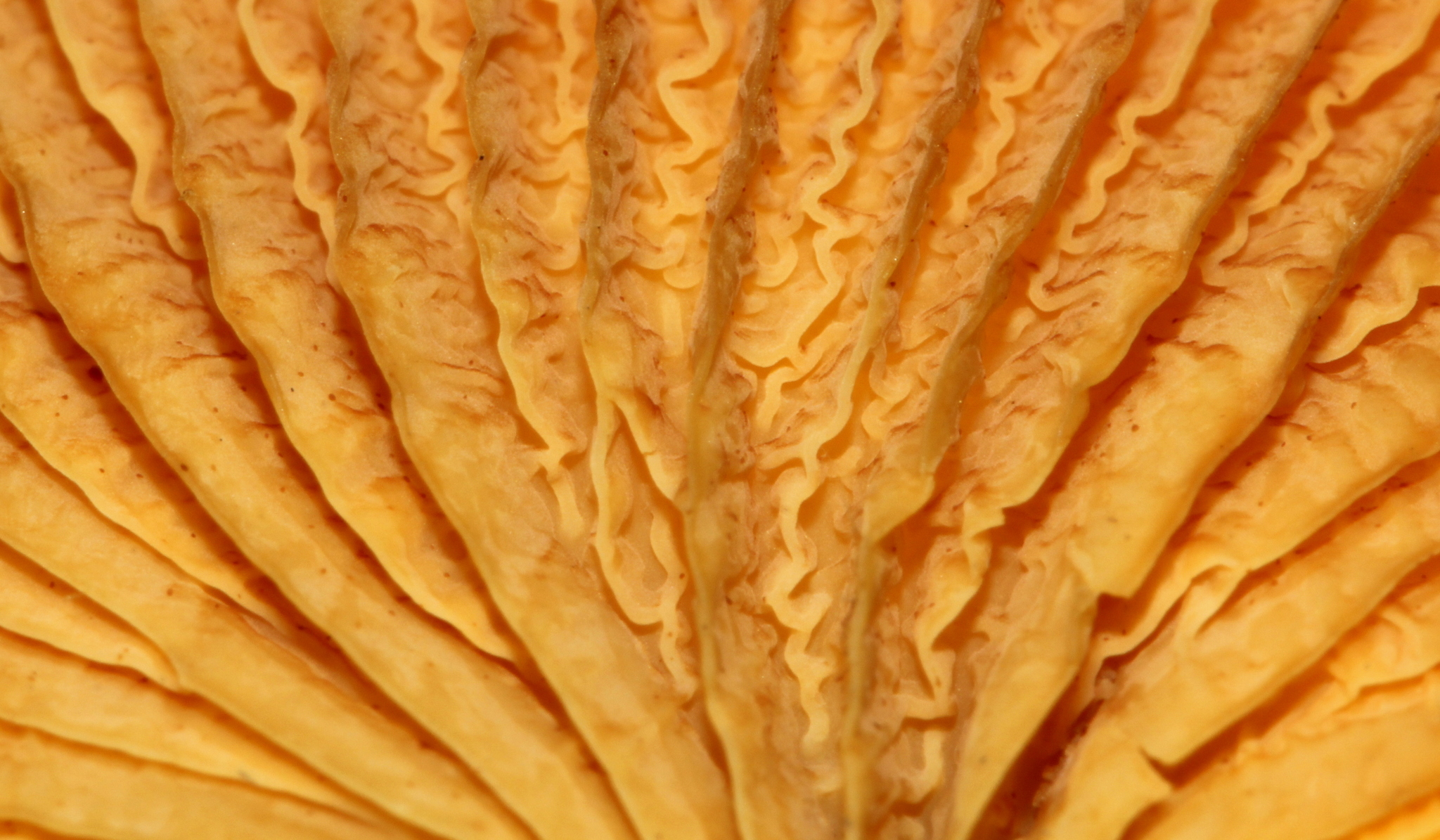
Close-up of the "crimped" gills

=== Similar species ===
In North America it can be confused with poisonous western jack o'lanterns, edible chanterelle mushrooms, false chanterelles (Hygrophoropsis aurantiaca), Crepidotus, or Phyllotopsis.

== Habitat ==
It grows on conifer wood and in lignin-rich humus.

== Toxicity ==
Despite its pleasant taste, the species is poisonous.

== Potential uses ==
Atromentin is a phenolic compound. The first enzymes in its biosynthesis have been characterised in T. panuoides.
