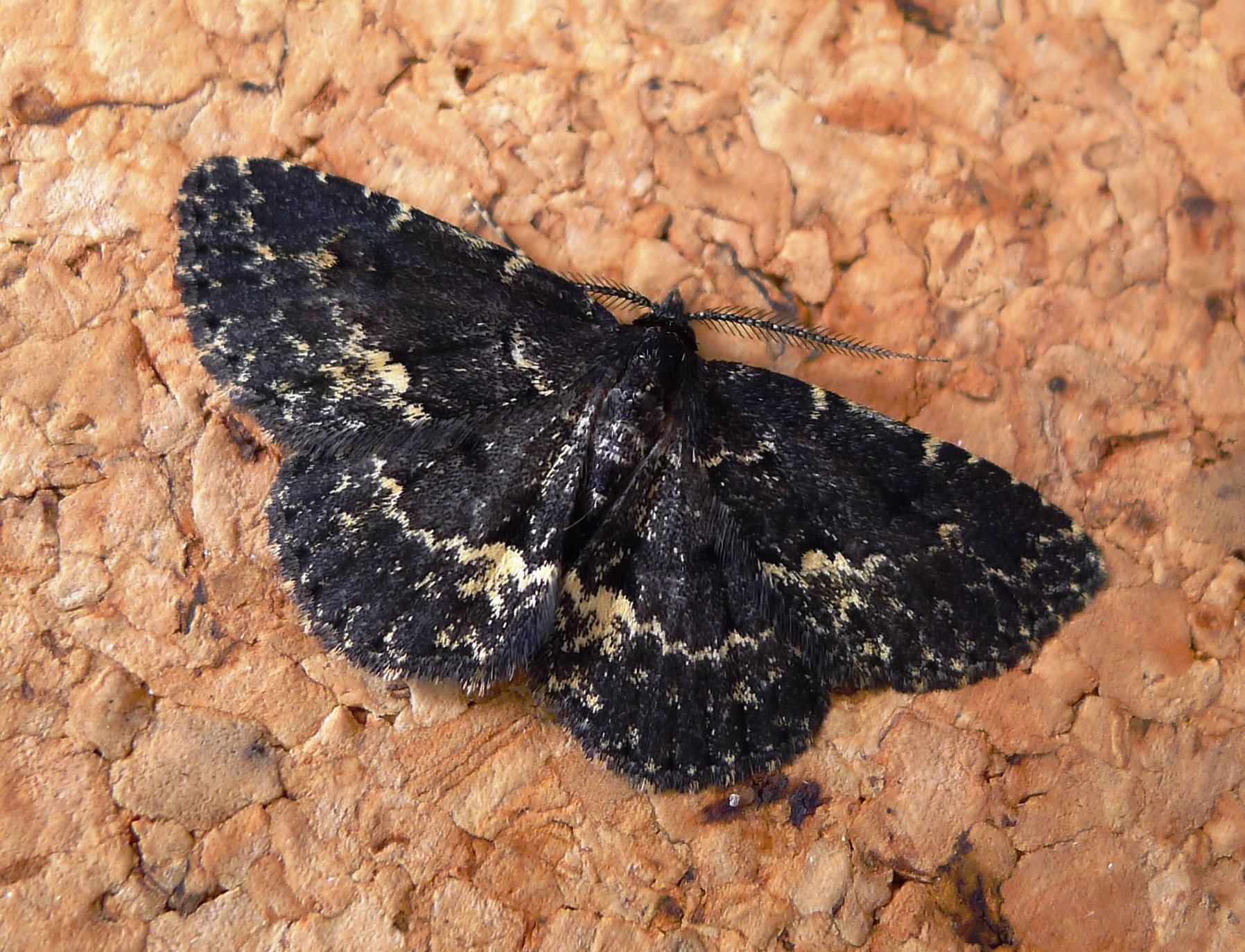
- Parascotia fuliginaria

Scientific classification
- Kingdom: Animalia
- Phylum: Arthropoda
- Clade: Pancrustacea
- Class: Insecta
- Order: Lepidoptera
- Superfamily: Noctuoidea
- Family: Erebidae
- Subfamily: Boletobiinae
- Genus: Parascotia; Hübner, 1825

= Parascotia =

Genus of moths

Parascotia is a genus of moths of the family Erebidae. The genus was erected by Jacob Hübner in 1825.

== Taxonomy ==
The genus has previously been classified in the subfamily Calpinae of the family Noctuidae.

== Species ==
- Parascotia detersa Staudinger, 1891
- Parascotia fuliginaria Linnaeus, 1761 – waved black moth
- Parascotia lorai Agenjo, 1967
- Parascotia nisseni Turati, 1905
