= Bondarcevomyces =

Scientific classification
- Kingdom: Fungi
- Division: Basidiomycota
- Class: Agaricomycetes
- Order: Boletales
- Family: Tapinellaceae
- Genus: Bondarcevomyces; Parmasto

Type species
- Bondarcevomyces taxi (Bondartsev) Parmasto

Synonyms
- 1940 Polyporus taxi Bondartsev; 1941 Hapalopilus taxi (Bondartsev) Bondartsev & Singer; 1993 Tyromyces taxi (Bondartsev) Ryvarden & Gilb. 1995 Parmastomyces taxi (Bondartsev) Y.C.Dai & Niemelä

Genus of fungi

Bondarcevomyces is a genus of fungus in the Tapinellaceae family. It is a monotypic genus, containing the single species Bondarcevomyces taxi, found in Asia. The species was originally described as Polyporus taxi by Appolinaris Semyonovich Bondartsev (or Apollinari Semjonowitsch Bondarzew) in 1940, and was transferred to the genera Hapalopilus, Tyromyces, and Parmastomyces before being made the type of the newly created Bondarcevomyces, published in Mycotaxon Vol.70 on page 219 in 1999.

The genus name of Bondarcevomyces is in honour of Margarita Appollinarievna Bondartseva (b.1935), a Russian botanist and the doughter of Bondartsev.
