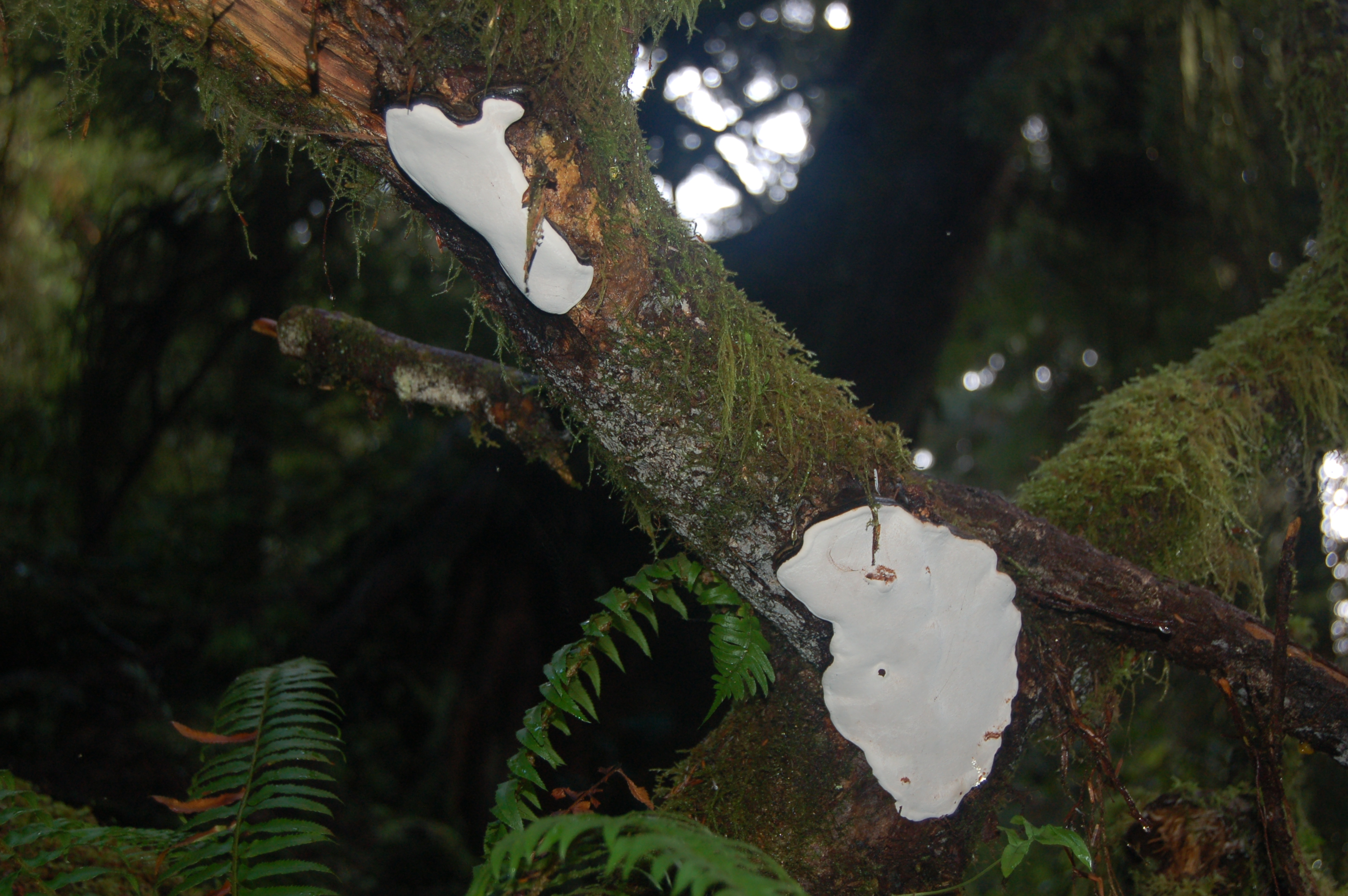

Scientific classification
- Domain: Eukaryota
- Kingdom: Fungi
- Division: Basidiomycota
- Class: Agaricomycetes
- Order: Russulales
- Family: Bondarzewiaceae
- Genus: Heterobasidion
- Species: H. occidentale

Binomial name
- Heterobasidion occidentale Otrosina & Garbel. (2010)

Synonyms
- Polyporus annosus; Fomes annosus; Heterobasidion annosum; Heterobasidon occidentale

= Heterobasidion occidentale =

Species of fungus

Heterobasidion occidentale is a tree root-rotting pathogenic fungus in the family Bondarzewiaceae. It is endemic in western North America west of the Rocky Mountains from Alaska to southern Mexico. While a natural agent of forest turnover, H. occidentale has become of increased concern due to forest management processes such as pre-commercial thinning, altered site density and species composition, and carbon sequestration. H. occidentale is part of the S-type intersterility group differing from the other North American species H. irregulare.

== Taxonomy ==
H. occidentale was only known as North American 'S'-type or H. parviporum until being formally described and named in 2010. Interfertility and genetic studies established that H. occidentale is distinct from H. irregulare and H. parviporum. The H. occidentale and H. parviporum ancestor likely occupied Eastern Asia and Western North America 35 to 42 million years ago, where H. occidentale crossed the Bering Strait crossing open 100–3.5 million years ago and evolved into a unique species.

== Description ==
The cap is usually wider (and commonly taller) than its depth from the wood. It is 2–15 centimetres (1–6 in) wide, sometimes fuzzy when young and knobby when old. The upper surface of the small shelf or "conk" is dark brown to black, and the margin has an irregular edge. The larger base is covered with white spore tubes. The flesh is whitish and displays annual tube layers.

Identification in affected wood, known as white pocket rot, includes symptoms in the form of dark discolouration around the heartwood near the base. Heavily diseased wood will be soft, stringy, and fibrous that may contain black specks parallel to the grain. Quick identification of affected wood can be done by wrapping suspect wood in damp paper towels and left for 5–6 days for the tell-tale formation of the conidial anamorph, Spiniger meineckellus. The basidiospores are spherical to ellipsoid, distinctive of the family Bondarzewiaceae.

=== Similar species ===
Distinction from H. irregulare is difficult as both share similar morphologies, distribution, and host range. In stands were both species are endemic, differentiation by hosts is unreliable due to shared host species and the potential spread from root contacts from other host species. Identification using genetic methods is the most accurate method for differentiation. Morphologically differentiation is most reliably made through pore density of the basidiocarps as H. irregulare has a lower density than H. occidentale with more oblong and larger pores. The discovery of first generation hybrids in Montana could further confuse the speciation.

Additionally, Phellinus species grow higher on the trees and have brownish flesh.

== Distribution and habitat ==
H. occidentale is found in Western North America from Alaska to Southern Mexico. It is found as far inland as Colorado and Montana, but has not been observed east of the Rocky Mountains. The incidence is of highest importance in stands of intensive silviculture, such as Christmas tree plantations. It is also of high importance to the Abies religiosa forests in Central Mexico that are the winter home for the monarch butterfly (Danaus plexipus).

The perennial basidiocarps tend to form near the forest floor of affected trees, either on the base or roots of living or dead specimens, and thus may be hidden in the forest duff.

== Ecology ==
H. occidentale affects several species of trees including major hosts including Douglas-fir (Pseudotsuga menziesii), western hemlock (Tsuga heterophylla), and various fir (Abies) species. Other notable hosts include sitka spruce (Picea sitchensis) as well as numerous deciduous trees such as red alder (Alnus rubra), bigleaf maple (Acer macrophyllum) and pacific madrone (Arbutus menziesii). Ornamental and landscape trees are seldom affected. This contrasts the Eurasian S-type species, H. parviporum, which has a fairly strict host range of spruce, fir, and larch.

Heterobasidion can be spread through conidia, basidiospores, and mycelia. H. occidentale can not grow freely in soil and relies on aerial infection for distribution. Basidiospores can travel from the basidiocarps through the air infecting exposed sapwood from injured trees. Spores are present year-round, due to the perennial fruiting bodies, with the greatest quantity detected during spring and autumn in the Pacific Northwest. Forest distress such as pre-commercial thinning may increase spore release in affected forests.

Conidia can travel through air, water, or soil and can survive up to 10 months in some soil types. Disease symptoms are worse on well-drained soil with little organic litter. Sites with neutral or alkaline soil conditions, such as former agricultural sites may sustain more damage than continuously forested sites.

H. occidentale can also spread directly between the adjacent trees through root contact with an infected tree. This phenomenon can devastate forests creating ‘circles of death’ that can be difficult to remove from a stand. However compared to other root rot pathogens the genets of disease circles are not as large or as old as those found from Armillaria or Phellinus.

== Control ==
H. occidentale can be detected in stands due to lower crown height of affected trees in a stand. Infection weakens the roots and will travel up to 15 meters (49 ft) up the heartwood affecting wood quality and yield. The weakened roots will increase the chance of windthrow, which can be used to identify diseased sites. The hosts of H. occidentale tend to have increased butt and sapwood decay then H. irregulare hosts which suffer from cambial and sapwood necrosis. Affected trees can be hard to identify as older trees tend to show gradual symptoms such as decreased leader growth, abnormally short twigs or needles, as well as decreased root systems.

Control measures for H. occidentale focus on limiting the exposure of stumps for colonization by basidiospores. Basidiospores of H. occidentale can quickly colonize exposed stumps after logging, or pre-commercial thinning disturbances but infection rates are low due to competition with other saprotrophic fungi. Covering exposed stumps with a chemical barrier such as borax or urea is used in other parts of North America to control H. irregulare. Biological control agents, such as Phlebiopsis gigantea, have been demonstrated as competitive agents to displace Heterobasidion on stumps. Stump removal is a common method to remove inoculum and bait stumps from forests after logging for other Heterobasidion species but is not a common method of control for H. occidentale.
