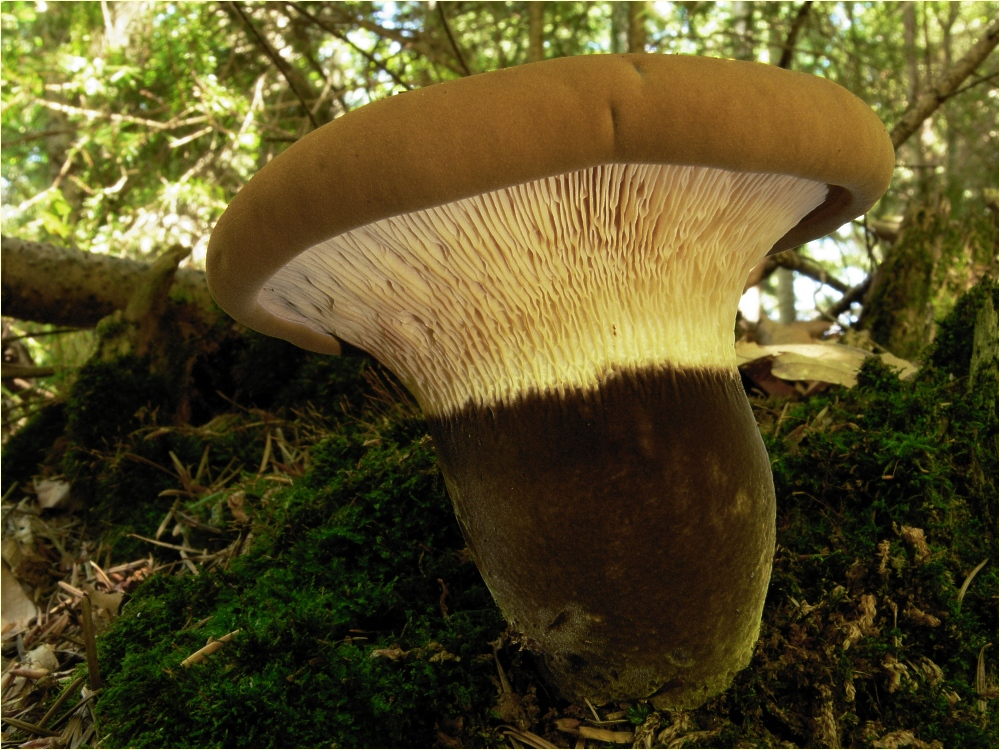
- Tapinella atrotomentosa

Scientific classification
- Domain: Eukaryota
- Kingdom: Fungi
- Division: Basidiomycota
- Class: Agaricomycetes
- Order: Boletales
- Family: Tapinellaceae
- Genus: Tapinella; E.-J.Gilbert

Type species
- Tapinella panuoides (Batsch) E.-J.Gilbert

Species
- Tapinella atrotomentosa Tapinella corrugata Tapinella panuoides

Synonyms
- Tapinia (Fr.) P.Karst. 1821 Agaricus trF. Tapinia Fr. 2001 Serpula sect. Tapinella (E.-J.Gilbert) Zmitr. 2004 Sarcopaxillus Zmitr., V.Malysheva & E.F.Malysheva

= Tapinella (fungus) =

Genus of fungi

Tapinella is a genus of three inedible fungi in the Tapinellaceae family. The genus was circumscribed by the French mycologist Jean-Edouard Gilbert in 1931.
