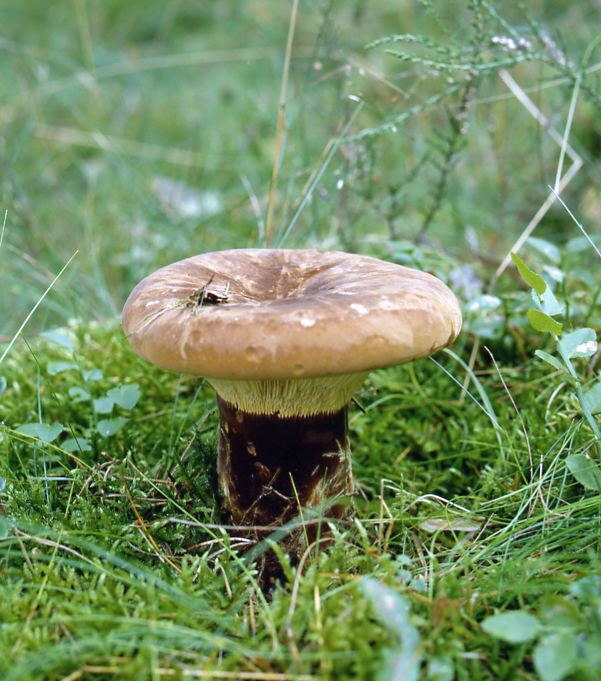
- Tapinella atrotomentosa

Scientific classification
- Kingdom: Fungi
- Division: Basidiomycota
- Class: Agaricomycetes
- Order: Boletales
- Family: Tapinellaceae; C.Hahn (1999)

Type genus
- Tapinella E.-J.Gilbert (1931)

Genera
- Bondarcevomyces; Pseudomerulius; Tapinella

= Tapinellaceae =

Family of fungi

The Tapinellaceae are a family of fungi in the order Boletales. Members of this family are: Bondarcevomyces, Pseudomerulius, and Tapinella.
