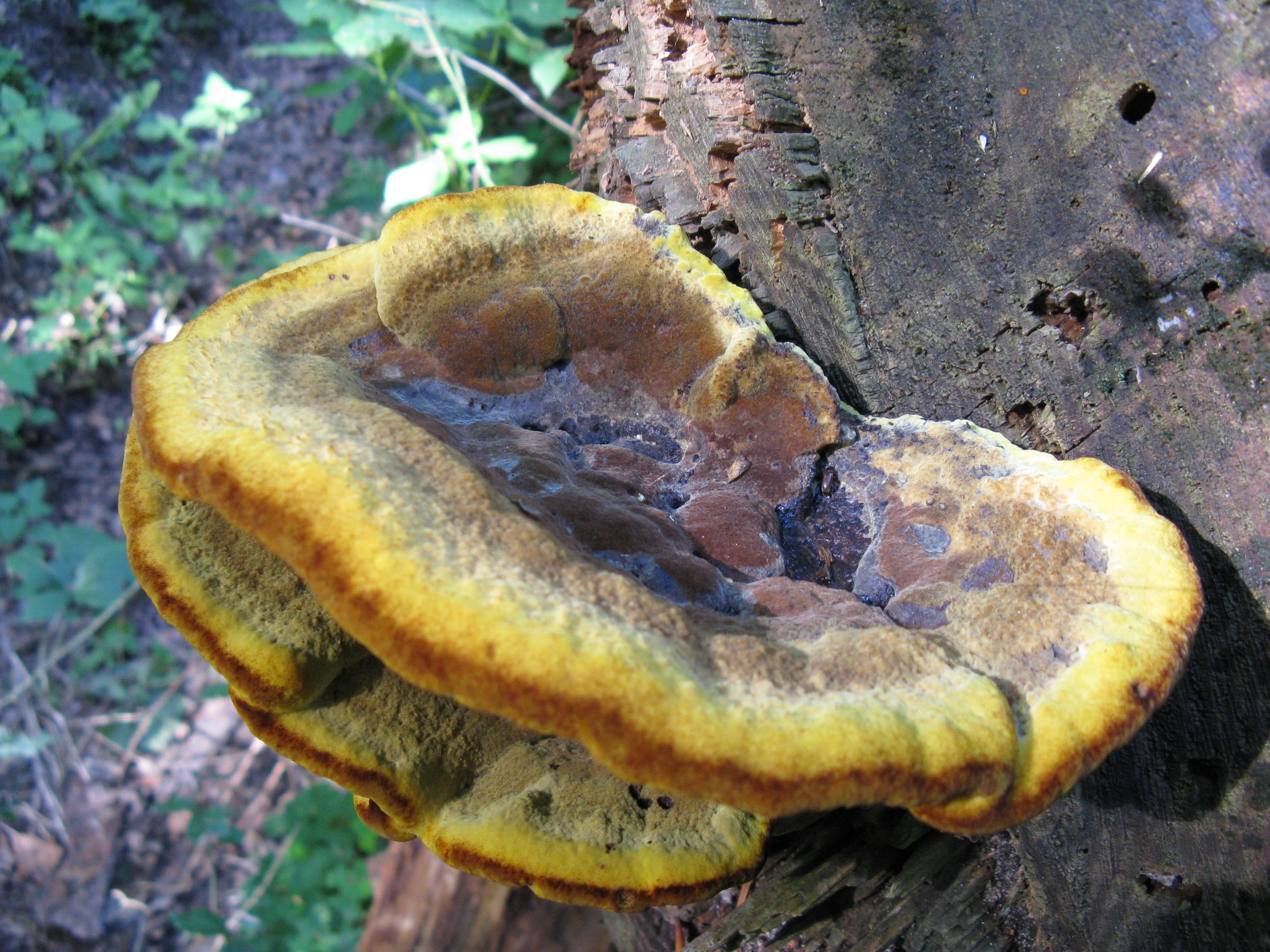
- Phaeolus schweinitzii

Scientific classification
- Kingdom: Fungi
- Division: Basidiomycota
- Class: Agaricomycetes
- Order: Polyporales
- Family: Phaeolaceae
- Genus: Phaeolus (Pat.) Pat. (1900)

Type species
- Phaeolus schweinitzii (Fr.) Pat. (1900)

Synonyms
- Fomes subgen. Fomes (Fr.) Fr. (1849); Romellia Murrill (1904); Spongiosus Lloyd ex Torrend (1920); Choriphyllum Velen. (1922)

= Phaeolus =

Genus of fungi

Phaeolus is a genus of polypore fungi in the family Fomitopsidaceae. The generic name is derived from the Ancient Greek word φαιος meaning "dark" or "obscure".

== Species ==
- Phaeolus amazonicus De Jesus & Ryvarden (2010) – Brazil
- Phaeolus asiae-orientalis Yuan et al. (2022) – Northeast China
- Phaeolus manihotis R.Heim (1931) – Tanzania
- Phaeolus rigidus (Lév.) Pat. (1915)
- Phaeolus schweinitzii (Fr.) Pat. (1900) – Europe, Asia, North America, Australia, New Zealand, South Africa
- Phaeolus sharmae Hembrom, A. Parihar, K. Das & A. Ghosh (2022) – India
- Phaeolus subbulbipes (Henn.) O.Fidalgo & M.Fidalgo (1957)
- Phaeolus tabulaeformis (Berk.) Pat. (1900)
- Phaeolus yunnanensis Yuan et al. (2022) – Southwest China
