= Lamella (mycology) =

Gills used by mushrooms as a means of spore dispersal

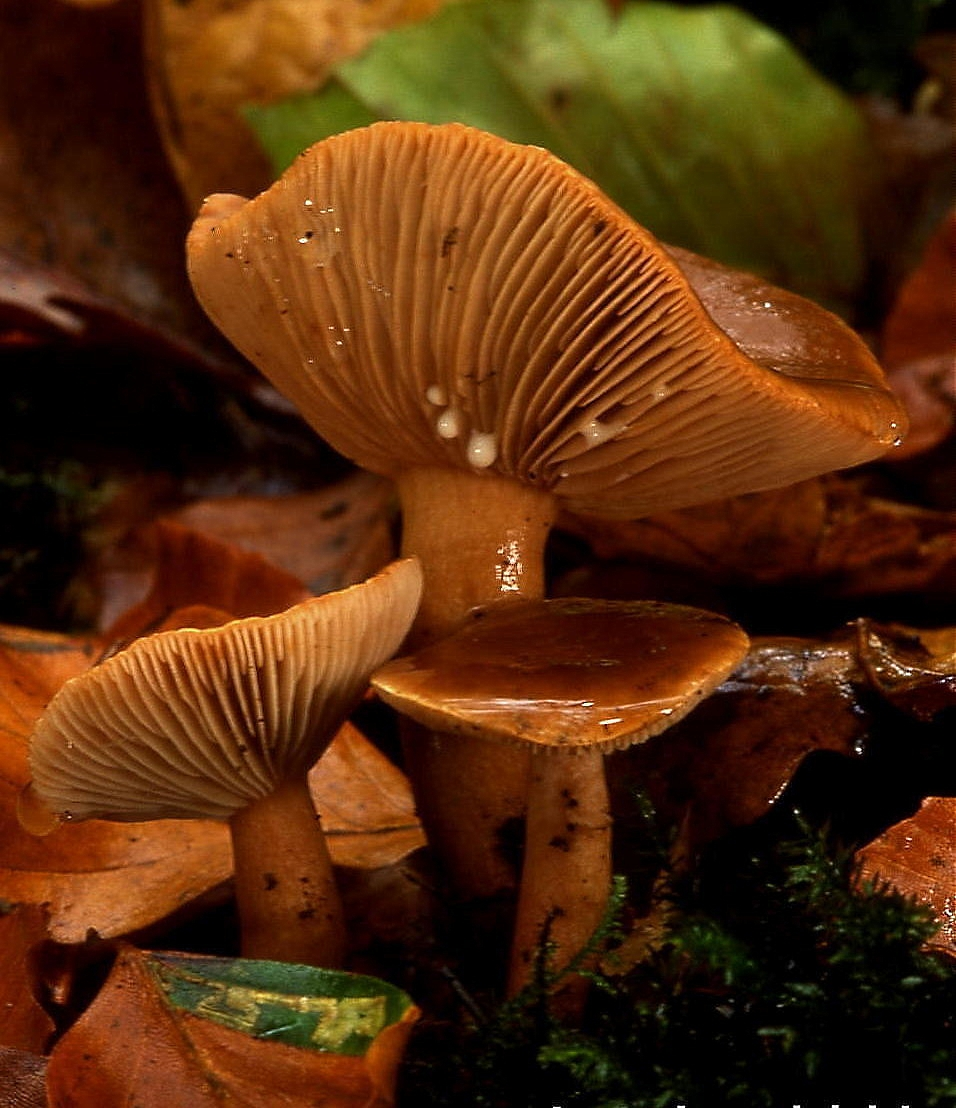
The gills of Lactarius subdulcis are characteristically adnate and leak latex.

In mycology, a lamella (pl.: lamellae), or gill, is a papery hymenophore rib under the cap of some mushroom species, most often agarics. The gills are used by the mushrooms as a means of spore dispersal, and are important for species identification. The attachment of the gills to the stem is classified based on the shape of the gills when viewed from the side, while color, crowding and the shape of individual gills can also be important features. Additionally, gills can have distinctive microscopic or macroscopic features. For instance, Lactarius species typically seep latex from their gills.

It was originally believed that all gilled fungi were Agaricales, but as fungi were studied in more detail, some gilled species were demonstrated not to be. It is now clear that this is a case of convergent evolution (i.e. gill-like structures evolved separately) rather than being an anatomic feature that evolved only once. The apparent reason that various basidiomycetes have evolved gills is that it is the most effective means of increasing the ratio of surface area to mass, which increases the potential for spore production and dispersal.

Other groups of fungi to bear gills include:

- The genera Russula and Lactarius of the Russulales.
- Several genera in the Boletales, including Gomphidius and Chroogomphus as well as Tapinella atrotomentosa (which has been traditionally named Paxillus atrotomentosus) and other species in that genus, the False chanterelle (Hygrophoropsis aurantiaca).
- Such polypore-like fungi such as Daedaleopsis confragosa, Lenzites betulina and Gloeophyllum sepiarium.

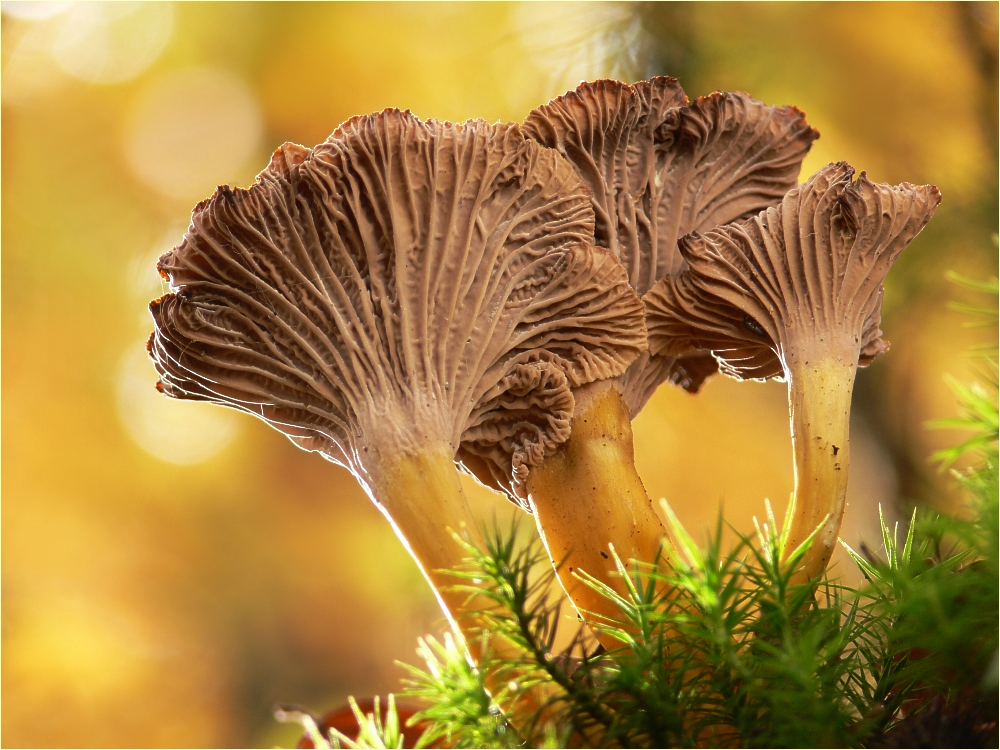
"False gills" of Craterellus tubaeformis

Members of the two related genera of chanterelles, Cantharellus and Craterellus, have rudimentary lamellar structures which are sometimes referred to as "false gills". They are distinguished from "true gills" because the structure of the fertile surface ("hymenium") continues uninterrupted over the gill edge, so they are little more than folds, wrinkles or veins. The genus Gomphus also has false gills. These primitive lamellae indicate how the evolution towards true gills probably happened.

Lamellula (pl.: lamellulae) are partial gills that do not reach the stipe.

== Classification ==
Morphologically, gills are classified according to their attachment to the stipe:

Adnate

Adnexed

Decurrent

Emarginate

Free

Seceding

Sinuate

Subdecurrent
