= Phaeolaceae =

Scientific classification
- Kingdom: Fungi
- Division: Basidiomycota
- Class: Agaricomycetes
- Order: Polyporales
- Family: Phaeolaceae

Family of fungi

Phaeolaceae is a family of dark, large fungi.

== Taxonomy ==
Phaeolaceae contains the following genera:

- Melanoporella
- Wolfiporia
- Phaeolus
