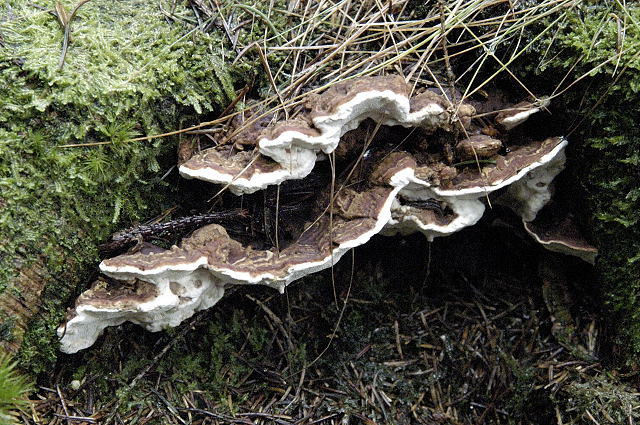

Scientific classification
- Kingdom: Fungi
- Division: Basidiomycota
- Class: Agaricomycetes
- Order: Russulales
- Family: Bondarzewiaceae
- Genus: Heterobasidion
- Species: H. annosum

Binomial name
- Heterobasidion annosum (Fr.) Bref. (1888)

Synonyms
- Boletus annosus Boletus cryptarum Fomes annosus Fomes annosus f. cryptarum Fomes cryptarum Fomitopsis annosa Friesia annosa Heterobasidion annosum f. cryptarum Heterobasidion cryptarum Physisporus makraulos Placodes annosus Polyporus annosus Polyporus cryptarum Polyporus fuscus Polyporus irregularis Polyporus makraulos Polyporus marginatoides Polyporus scoticus Polyporus subpileatus Polystictoides fuscus Polystictus cryptarum Poria cryptarum Poria macraula Pycnoporus annosus Scindalma annosum Scindalma cryptarum Spiniger meineckellus Spongioides cryptarum Trametes annosa Trametes radiciperda Ungulina annosa Ungulina annosa f. cryptarum Ungulina annosa f. makraulos Heterobasidon irregulare

= Heterobasidion annosum =

Heterobasidion annosum
- Mycological characteristics
- Pores on hymenium
- No distinct cap or offset
- Hymenium attachment is irregular or not applicable or decurrent
- Lacks a stipe or is bare
- Spore print is white
- Ecology is parasitic
- Edibility is inedible

Heterobasidion annosum is a basidiomycete fungus in the family Bondarzewiaceae. It is considered to be the most economically important forest pathogen in the Northern Hemisphere. Heterobasidion annosum is widespread in forests in the United States and is responsible for the loss of one billion U.S. dollars annually. This fungus has been known by many different names. First described by Fries in 1821, it was known by the name Polyporus annosum. Later, it was found to be linked to conifer disease by Robert Hartig in 1874, and was renamed Fomes annosus by H. Karsten. Its current name of Heterobasidion annosum was given by Brefeld in 1888. Heterobasidion annosum causes one of the most destructive diseases of conifers. The disease caused by the fungus is named annosus root rot.

== Description ==
The fruiting bodies of the fungus, which are also known as basidiocarps, are normally brackets which are whitish around the margins and dark brown on the uneven, knobbly upper surface. They can blacken in age. They can also take a resupinate form, consisting only of a white crust which corresponds to the underside of the bracket. Basidiocarps are up to about 40 cm in diameter and 3.5 cm thick. The fertile surface of the fruiting body is white, easily bruising brown, and has barely visible pores, with 3-4 per mm. The flesh, which has a strong fungus smell, is elastic when young but becomes woody when older.

Sexual spores called basidiospores are created in the fertile layer on the lower surface of the basidiocarps, whilst conidiospores occur in the asexual stage and are produced on microscopic "conidiophores" which erupt through the surface of the host tree. Conidiospores and basidiospores are both produced by this fungus, the latter being more important for infecting the conifers.

The species is inedible.

== Ecology and life cycle ==
In the summertime, basidiospores, the primary infective propagules, are released. These basidiospores are carried long distances by wind currents. They infect trees (usually conifers) through damage such as freshly cut stumps. Once on the stump the fungus colonizes and moves into the root via mycelium. Heterobasidion annosum moves short distances from the roots of an infected stump through root grafts with other trees. It can also spread through insects that feed on roots. Since this fungus can not move very far through soil, it relies on tree roots to help it infect neighbouring trees. In these roots, it can grow 0.1–2.0 m per year. This results in a spread of the fungus and disease gaps in the forest. These disease gaps are produced when the trees die and fall, creating gaps in the forest canopy. These gaps affect the moisture and sunlight available, altering the habitats for plants and animals on the forest floor. Spiniger meineckellus, the name for the asexual stage of this fungus, is produced on stumps when the conditions are moist, and the conidiospores that are produced will be able to live in the soil for up to ten months. The role of conidiospores is unknown in the infection process and is not thought to be important.

== Symptoms and signs of disease ==
Symptoms and signs of fungus disease are often found underground. The H. annosum infections cause an abnormal change in structure in the roots that climbs up to the butt of the tree. More than half the tree may be killed before any symptoms appear to the human eye. Basidiocarps can take up to one and a half or even three years to be visible. This infections causes the trees to have abnormal needle growth, pale yellow barks, and the trees to wither and die. This root disease typically causes the tree to have a thin crown from bottom up and inside out. Trees will eventually die. A landscape scale symptom is the rings of dead trees in various stages of decay and death, with the oldest at the center and progressively younger moving outward. The white rot fungus found in the roots is the sign of telling whether the tree has been affected by H. annosum. The bark changes colors as the stages progress, they go from pale yellow, to a crusty light brown, and finally in its advanced stage it turns white with the signature of Fomes annosus―a sprinkled streak of black spots. Another sign is the leaking part of the root that causes a compact mass to form between it and the sand.

== Isolation ==
There are several ways to isolate H. annosum. Water agar could be used with infected host tissue to produce conidiophores which a simple or branched part hypha of a fungus to eliminate H. annosum. Another way of isolating H. annosum is by using the thin disks of living sapwood from Picea abies. By cutting the thin disks into petri dishes which is used to culture bacteria and placing them on moist filter paper, this technique allows spores to be captured from the air, and result in the asexual stage of the fungus forming on the disks.

== Range ==
The species is endemic to the United States. It was introduced into Italy during the Second World War, vectored in wooden crate material.

== Management ==
Theoretically, a root can be suppressed during all stages of its life cycle. There are three ways of managing Heterobasidion annosum: silvicultural control measures, chemical methods and biological control. Silvicultural control involves planting species with low susceptibility. This could lower the root rot problem and free an infected site from inoculum. A more extreme measure is to remove the inoculum from the infected site. Proper planning and mixture schemes produce a better yield than a pure plantation (i.e. containing only one species). An alternative species could always be used for protection against H. annosum. Chemical methods include prophylactic stump treatment with a solution of urea immediately after the infection. This protects the stump by hydrolysis of the compound by the enzyme urease in the living wood tissue, which results in formation of ammonia and a rise in pH to a level that H. annosum at which mycelia are unable to survive. Biological control is another alternative. Currently, a number of fungal species such as Phlebiopsis gigantea, Bjerkandera adusta and Fomitopsis pinicola have been tested on stumps as competitors and antagonists against H. annosum. However, among these, only Phlebiopsis gigantea shows good results of eliminating H. annosum.
