= Melanoporella =

Scientific classification
- Kingdom: Fungi
- Division: Basidiomycota
- Class: Agaricomycetes
- Order: Hymenochaetales
- Family: Nigrofomitaceae
- Genus: Melanoporella; Murrill
- Species: M. carbonacea

Binomial name
- Melanoporella carbonacea (Berk. & M.A. Curtis) Murrill

Genus of fungi

Melanoporella is a genus of fungi. As of July 2026, its only species is Melanoporella carbonacea.
