= Tapinella (insect) =

Scientific classification
- Kingdom: Animalia
- Phylum: Arthropoda
- Clade: Pancrustacea
- Class: Insecta
- Order: Psocodea
- Family: Pachytroctidae
- Genus: Tapinella; Enderlein, 1908; Zool. Anz., 33, 772, Volume 4, page 400

Genus of booklice

Tapinella is a genus of thick barklice in the family Pachytroctidae. There are at least 40 described species in Tapinella.

== Species ==
These 41 species belong to the genus Tapinella:

Data sources: i = ITIS, c = Catalogue of Life, g = GBIF, b = Bugguide.net
