= Larch bolete =

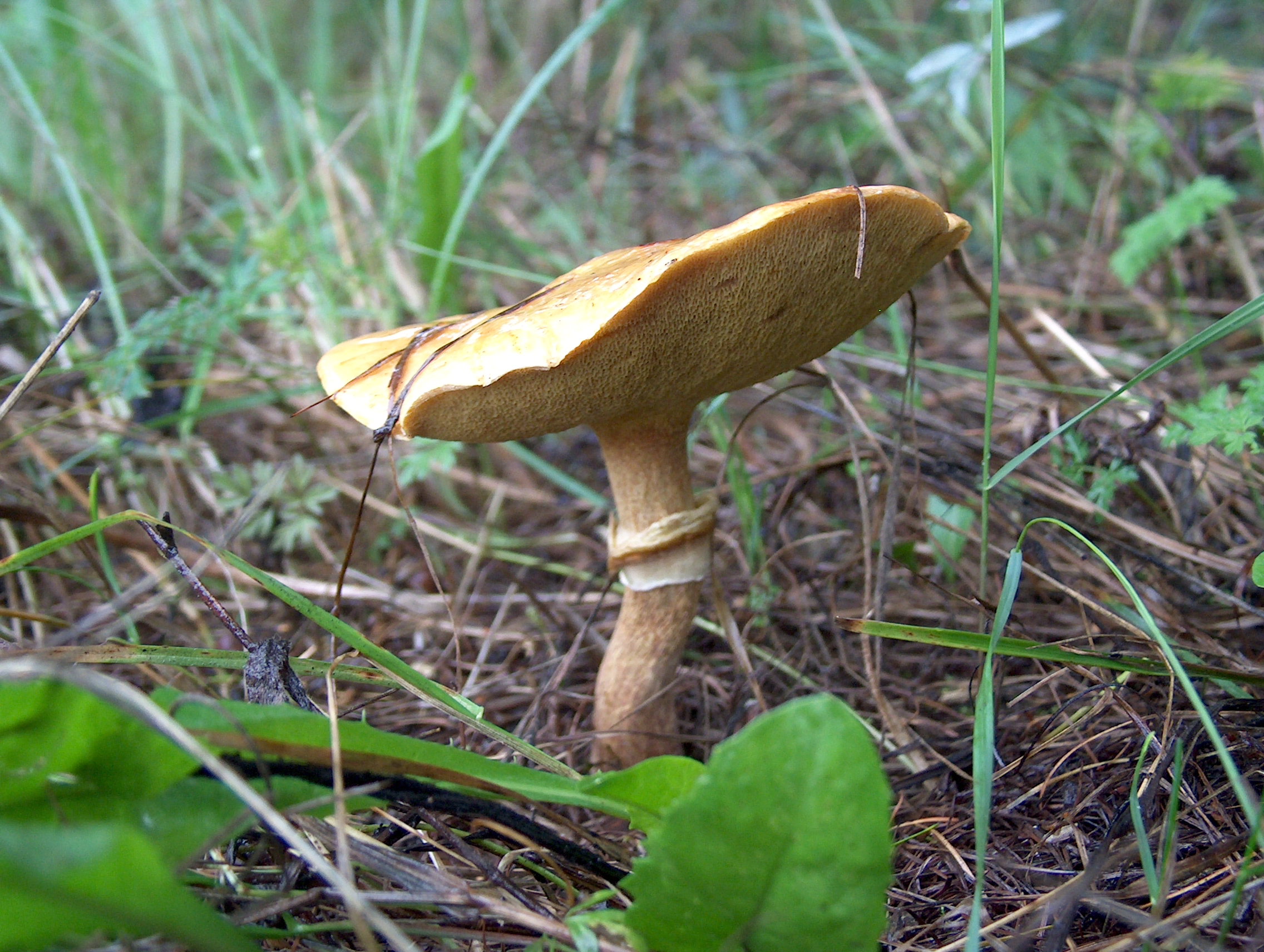
Suillus grevillei

The name larch bolete is used to describe a number of fungi in the order Boletales which occur in association with species of larch, conifers in the genus Larix. These fungi include members of the genus Suillus:

- S. cavipes
- S. grevillei (larch bolete, Greville's bolete, or bovine bolete)
- S. ochraceoroseus (rosy larch bolete)
- S. viscidus (sticky bolete, grayish larch bolete)
