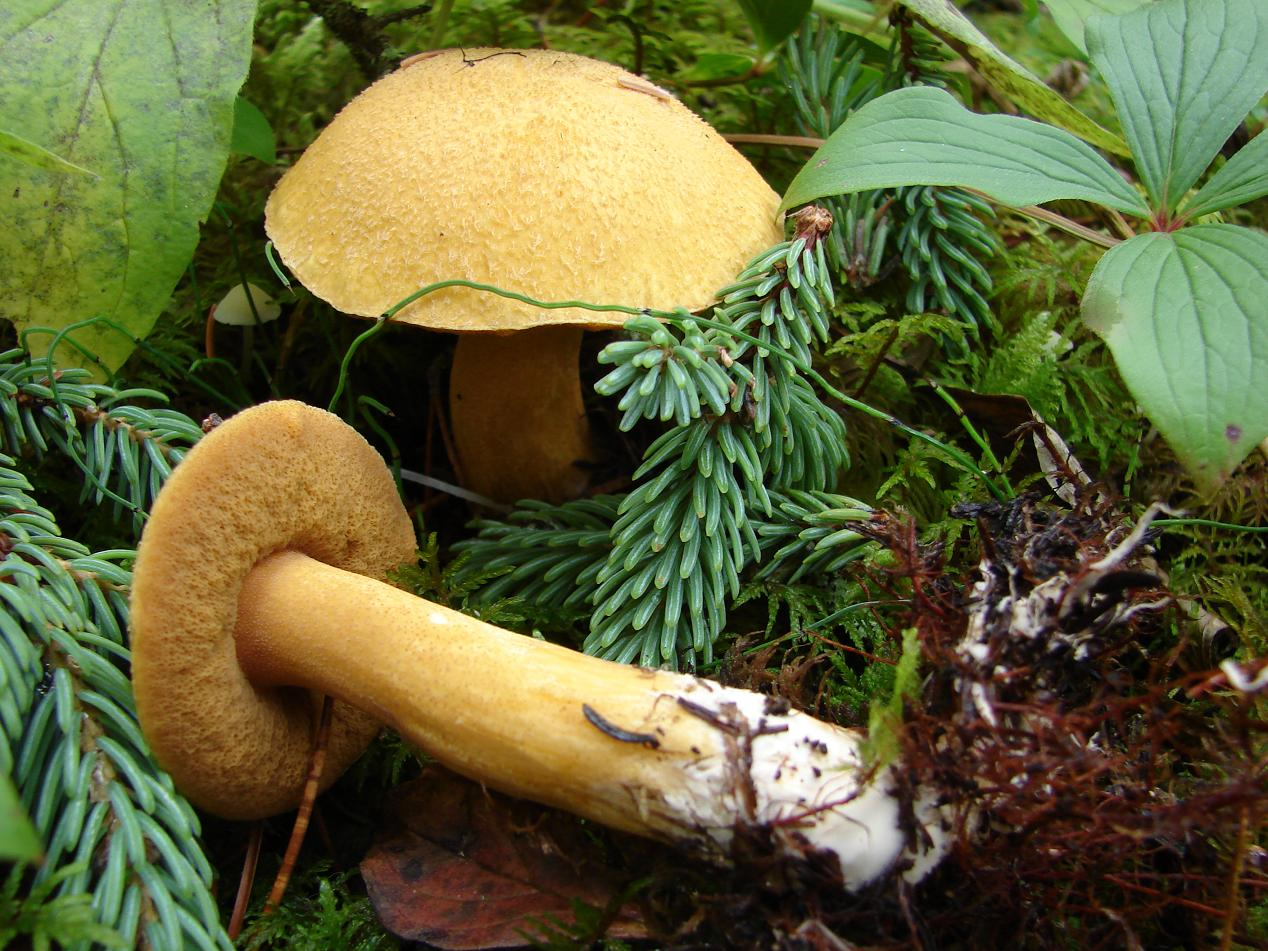

Scientific classification
- Kingdom: Fungi
- Division: Basidiomycota
- Class: Agaricomycetes
- Order: Boletales
- Family: Suillaceae
- Genus: Suillus
- Species: S. tomentosus

Binomial name
- Suillus tomentosus (Kauffman) Singer

= Suillus tomentosus =

Species of fungus

Suillus tomentosus
- Mycological characteristics
- Pores on hymenium
- Cap is convex or flat
- Stipe is bare
- Spore print is olive-brown
- Ecology is mycorrhizal
- Edibility is edible but not recommended

Suillus tomentosus is a species of fungus. The common names of the species are blue-staining slippery jack, poor man's slippery Jack, and woolly-capped suillus. Found in North America, the mushroom is edible for most people, but may cause gastric upset in others; it also resembles some poisonous species.

== Description ==
The cap is 5–12 cm (2–4 3/4 in) wide, pale to orange-yellow with grayish brownish or reddish tomentum, and viscid while fresh. The fibrillose-scaly surface of the cap helps distinguish it from other species in the genus. The tubes are yellow and become blue when bruised. It has no veil. The stipe is 3–11 cm (1–4 1/2 in) tall and 1–3 cm wide, glandular dotted and the color is similar to the cap.

The spore print is dark olive brown to brown. The spores are brownish when they are young. The species stains fingers blue. The yellow interior of the mushroom should slowly turn green-blue when cut with a knife.

=== Similar species ===
Similar species include S. fuscotomentosus, S. reticulatus, S. variegatus, and Boletus subtomentosus.

== Distribution and habitat ==
The species is commonly found in the Rocky Mountains of Idaho and the Pacific Northwest. It is less common in the lake states. The species fruits in the summer in the Rockies and in autumn along the Pacific coast and in the lake states. The species is by itself or scattered in mixed forests. The species can commonly be found under lodgepole pines or other two-needle pines. It is rarely found under jack pines.

Suillus tomentosus forms tuberculate ectomycorrhizae (mycorrhizae that are nodular) with lodgepole pine (Pinus contorta var. latifolia). Recent work has shown that acetylene is reduced by the nodules which means that nitrogen is being fixed by bacteria within the nodules. This system is functionally similar to the root nodules in legumes like clover. Lodgepole pine can be found growing on gravel pits or other extremely nitrogen deficient soils. Lodgepole pine with its S. tomentosus symbiont is one of the most common pioneer species in northern forests. It colonizes highly disturbed soils and creates an environment suitable for other species to colonize.

== Edibility ==
The mushroom may be edible to some while others may find its taste acidic even after cooking. The species has been known to cause gastric upset in some people. According to David Arora, the species is of the same quality as S. fuscotomentosus. Arora reports that one collector stated the mushroom smells and tastes like Tootsie Rolls when dried. The species have also been said to smell like almonds. When they look for this species, consumers are advised to be careful to distinguish it from other species that stain blue but are poisonous.

== See also ==
- List of North American boletes
