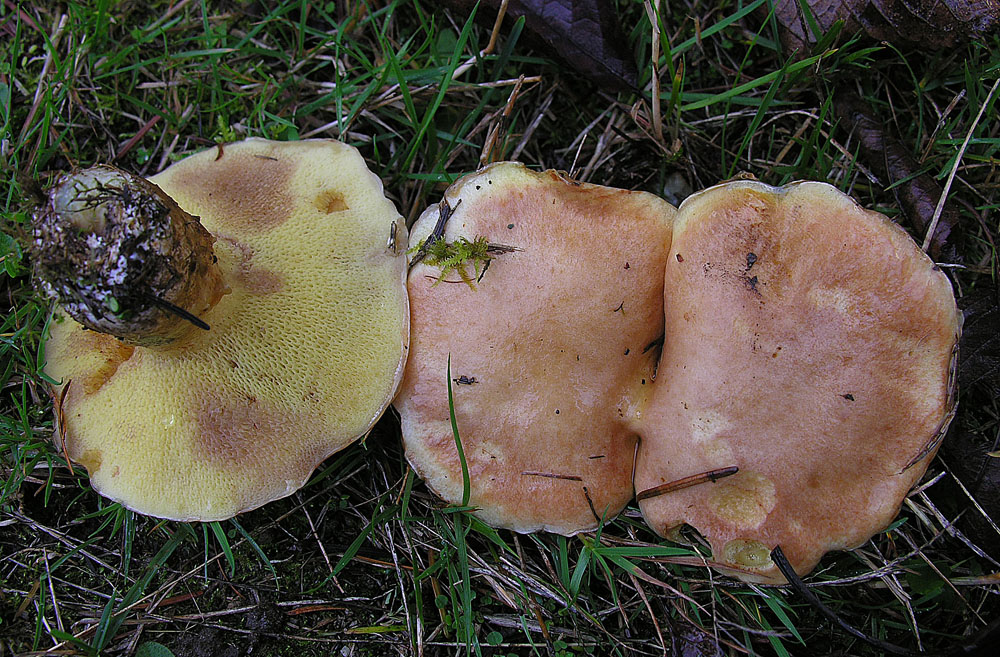

Scientific classification
- Kingdom: Fungi
- Division: Basidiomycota
- Class: Agaricomycetes
- Order: Boletales
- Family: Suillaceae
- Genus: Suillus
- Species: S. caerulescens

Binomial name
- Suillus caerulescens A.H.Sm. & Thiers (1964)

= Suillus caerulescens =

Species of fungus

Suillus caerulescens, commonly known as the douglas-fir suillus and fat jack, is a species of bolete fungus in the family Suillaceae.

== Taxonomy ==
The species was first described scientifically by American mycologists Alexander H. Smith and Harry D. Thiers in 1964.

Phylogenetic relationships of closely related species

- - - - - - S. caerulescens
          - S. lakei
        - S. granulatus
      - - S. grevillei
        - - S. luteus
          - S. brevipes
    - S. cavipes
  - all other Suillus species

Cladogram of 7 closely related species according to the Open Tree of Life.

Suillus caerulescens Mycological characteristics
- Pores on hymenium
- Cap is convex or flat
- Hymenium is adnate or decurrent
- Stipe is bare or has a ring
- Spore print is brown
- Ecology is mycorrhizal
- Edibility is edible

== Description ==
The cap is yellowish to reddish brown, sometimes with streaks from its darker center. It ranges from 4–15 cm (1.5–6 in) in diameter, shaped convex to flat, and viscid when wet, sometimes with veil remnants on the edge. The flesh is yellowish, as are the pores. The stalk is yellowish to brown, darkening with age, 2–8 cm tall, 1–3 cm wide, and bruises bluish to brownish (often slowly), especially at the base. A faint ring may be present.

The flesh can have a lemony flavour. The spore print is reddish-brown.

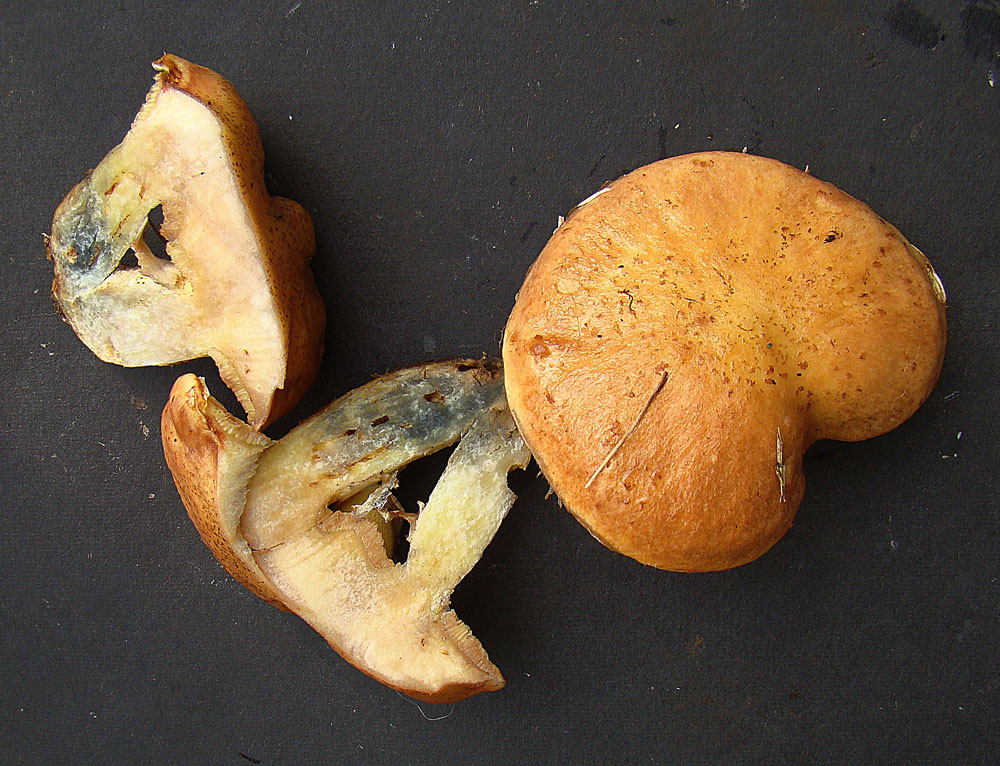
Fruit body examples

=== Similar species ===
Suillus lakei is fairly similar, as is S. ponderosus.

== Habitat and distribution ==
It can be found growing with Douglas-fir trees in western North America from October to December.

== Uses ==
While edible, it is considered of mediocre to poor quality.

== See also ==
- List of North American boletes
