= Fat Jack =

Fat Jack may refer to:

- Jack E. Leonard, an American comedian and actor
- Jack Fisher, an American baseball player
- James Clark, an American record producer and DJ in Project Blowed
- Suillus caerulescens, a mushroom species
