= Suillus subacerbus =

Scientific classification
- Domain: Eukaryota
- Kingdom: Fungi
- Division: Basidiomycota
- Class: Agaricomycetes
- Order: Boletales
- Family: Suillaceae
- Genus: Suillus
- Species: S. subacerbus

Binomial name
- Suillus subacerbus McNabb (1968)

Species of fungus

Suillus subacerbus is a species of bolete fungus in the family Suillaceae. Described as new to science in 1968 by mycologist Robert Francis Ross McNabb, it is found in New Zealand, where it grows in association with Pinus radiata.

== Description ==
Its fruitbodies produce convex to flattened caps measuring 7–14 cm (2.8–5.5 in) in diameter. The cap colour is quite variable, ranging from creamy yellow to olive grey initially, later becoming ochre, brown, or reddish orange (sometimes streaked) as the fruitbody matures. The pore surface on the cap underside is dull yellow, later becoming darker. Pores are small and angular, about 0.75–1 mm in diameter. The stipe measures 5–8 cm (2–3 in) long by up to 2.5 cm (1.0 in) wide, and lacks a ring.

The spore print is yellowish brown. Spores are smooth elliptical, with typical dimensions of 7.8–9.1 by 3.0–3.6 μm.

The complex of species that include Suillus granulatus, S. pungens, and S. acerbus appear to be closely related. McNabb suggests that Suillus subacerbus is "probably of North American origin".
