= Cortinarius indolicus =

Scientific classification
- Kingdom: Fungi
- Division: Basidiomycota
- Class: Agaricomycetes
- Order: Agaricales
- Family: Cortinariaceae
- Genus: Cortinarius
- Subgenus: Cortinarius subg. Myxacium
- Species: C. indolicus

Binomial name
- Cortinarius indolicus E. Horak 1990

Species of fungus

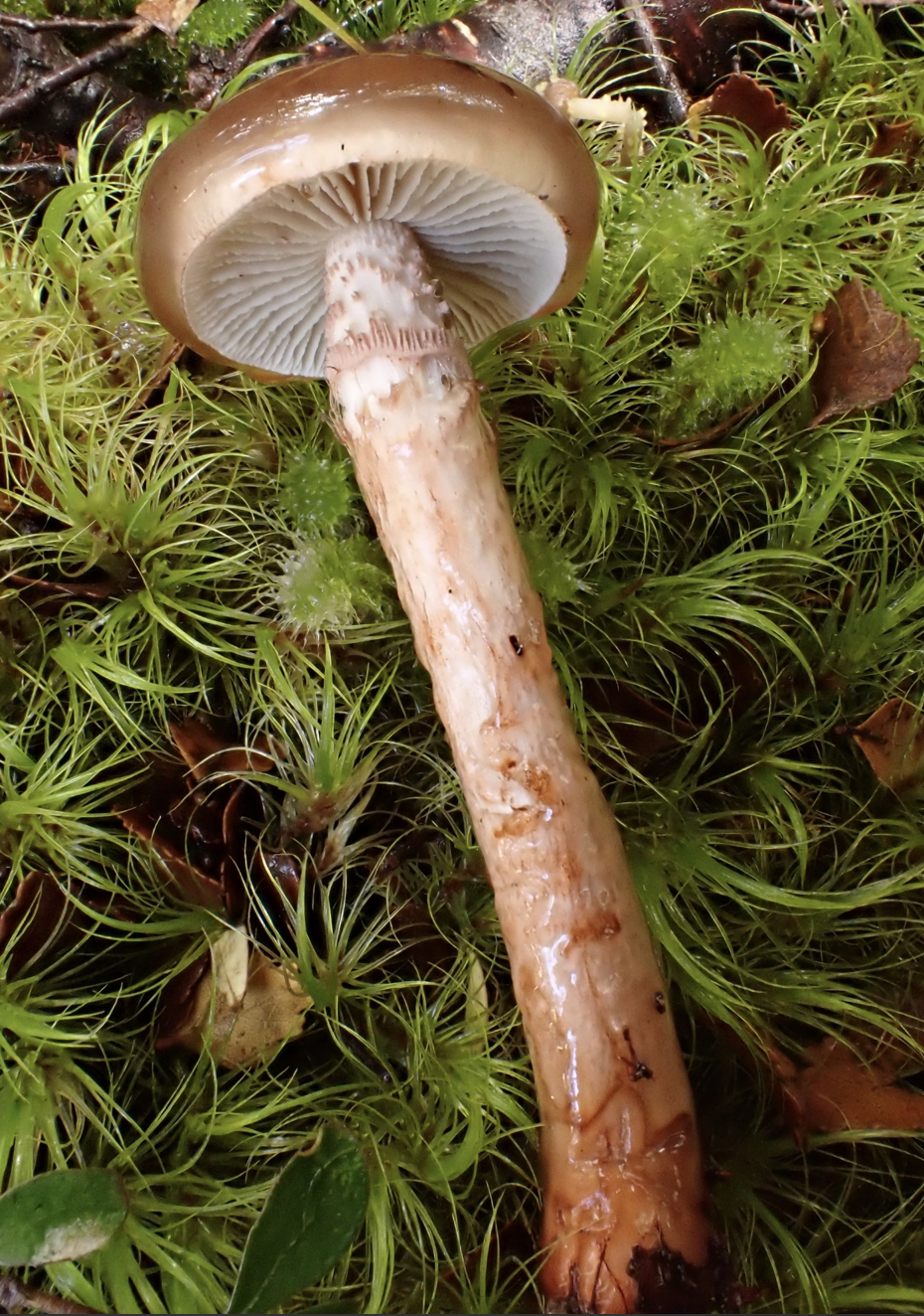
Cortinarius Indolicus

Cortinarius indolicus is a basidiomycete fungus of the genus Cortinarius native to New Zealand.

== Description ==
The pileus measures 20–35 mm in diameter, and is glutinous and weakly hygrophanous. it has a pale grey to pale grey-brown color, with a distinctive red center, The surface is smooth. The margin is weakly striate when younger, becoming more grooved as it matures. The gills are pale grey. The stipe is the shape of a cylinder, often featuring a small, round bulb, and is glutinous; it starts off grey-white, covered in reddish gluten when young, it then develops distinctive red spots and numerous thick red stair-like girdles on the stipe, which darken to red-brown after collection, ending in a small collar that is studded with red-brown scales. It has an abundant veil which is hyaline with a reddish tint, and the cortina is underdeveloped. The flesh is dirty grey to greyish tan, with an unmistakably strong odor, reminiscent of naphthalene (mothballs), sometimes with a more gas-like quality. It is considered tasteless. Chemical reactions are trivial, with no significant change observed upon application of NaOH. Microscopically, the spores are broadly amygdaloid (almond shaped, but rounded), measuring 11.7–15 × 7–8.5 μm, and are moderately to fairly coarsely verrucose (bumpy/warty)

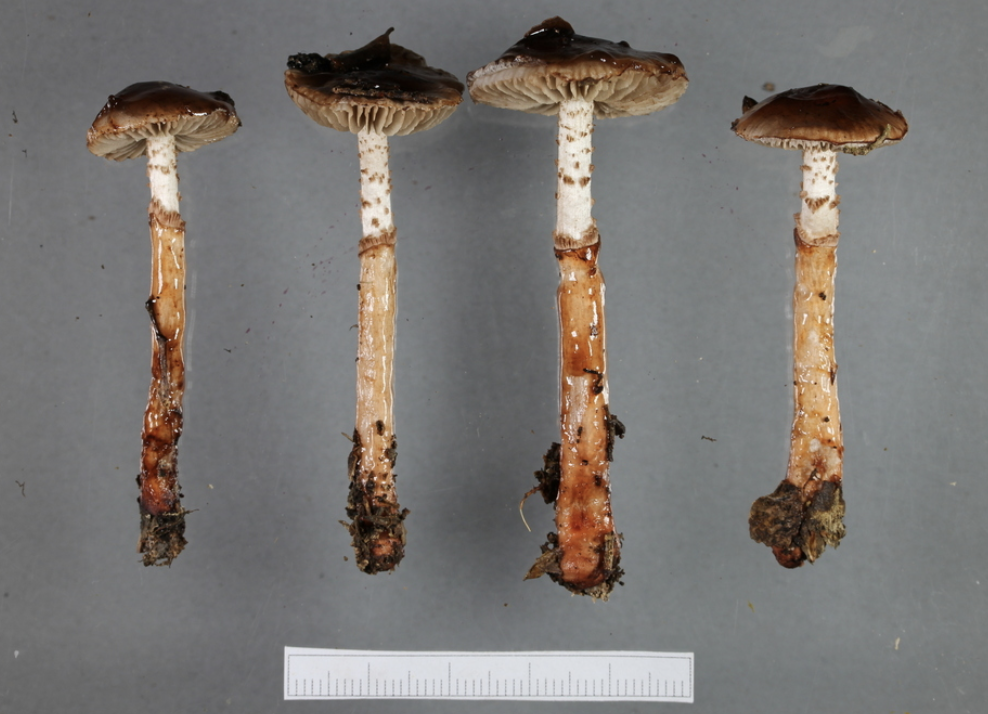
Cortinarius Indolicus

== Distribution and habitat ==
Cortinarius indolicus is considered occasional in New Zealand's Nothofagus forests where it grows on soil, associated with N. fusca and N. menziesii.

== See also ==
- List of Cortinarius species
