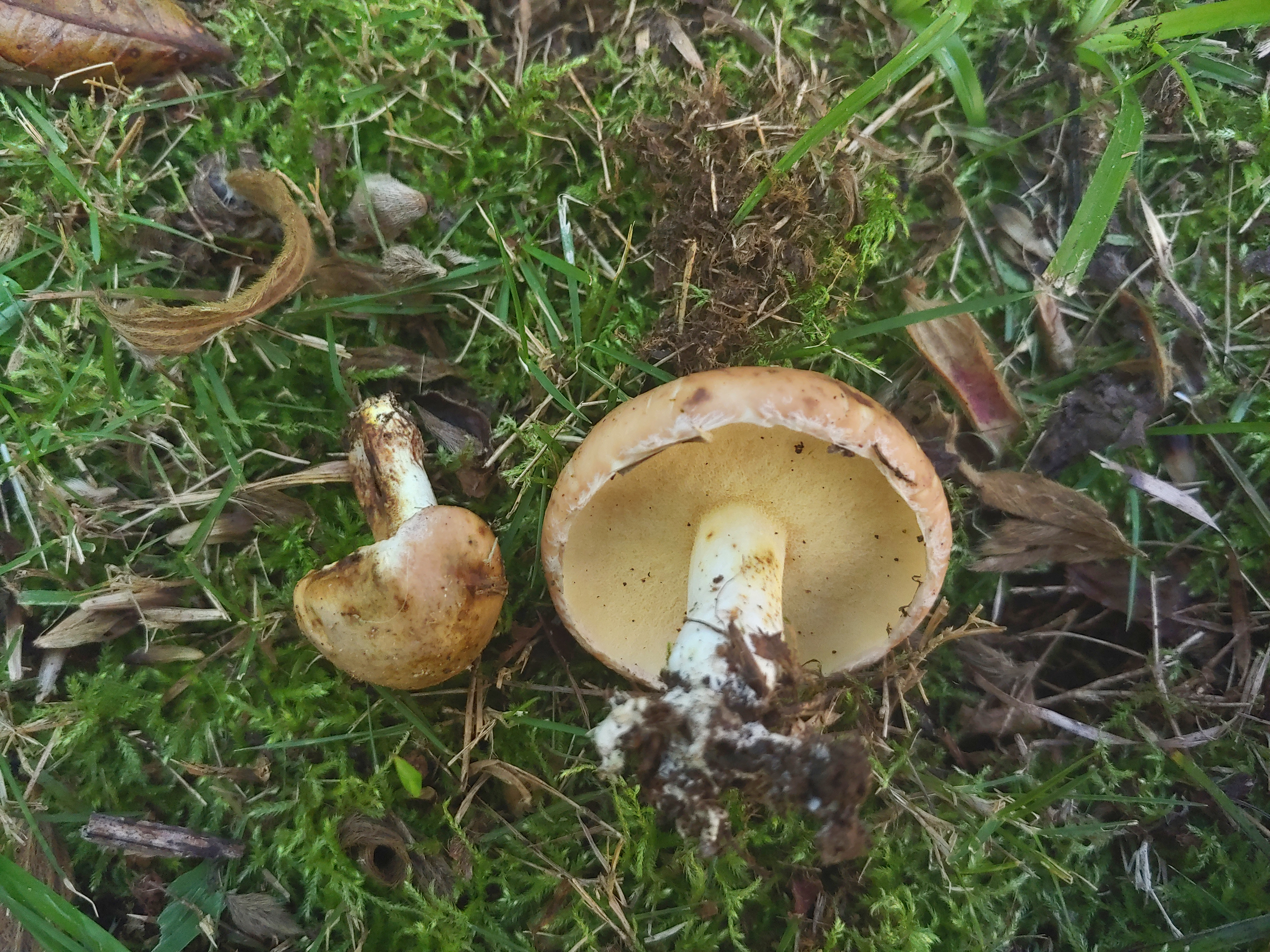

Scientific classification
- Domain: Eukaryota
- Kingdom: Fungi
- Division: Basidiomycota
- Class: Agaricomycetes
- Order: Boletales
- Family: Suillaceae
- Genus: Suillus
- Species: S. pseudoalbivelatus

Binomial name
- Suillus pseudoalbivelatus B.Ortiz & Lodge (2007)

= Suillus pseudoalbivelatus =

Species of fungus

Suillus pseudoalbivelatus is a species of bolete fungus in the family Suillaceae. Found in the Dominican Republic, it was described as new to science in 2007.
