= Suillus pallidiceps =

Scientific classification
- Domain: Eukaryota
- Kingdom: Fungi
- Division: Basidiomycota
- Class: Agaricomycetes
- Order: Boletales
- Family: Suillaceae
- Genus: Suillus
- Species: S. pallidiceps

Binomial name
- Suillus pallidiceps A.H.Sm. & Thiers (1964)

Species of fungus

Suillus pallidiceps is a species of bolete fungus in the family Suillaceae. It was first described scientifically by American mycologists Alexander H. Smith and Harry D. Thiers in 1964.

== See also ==
- List of North American boletes
