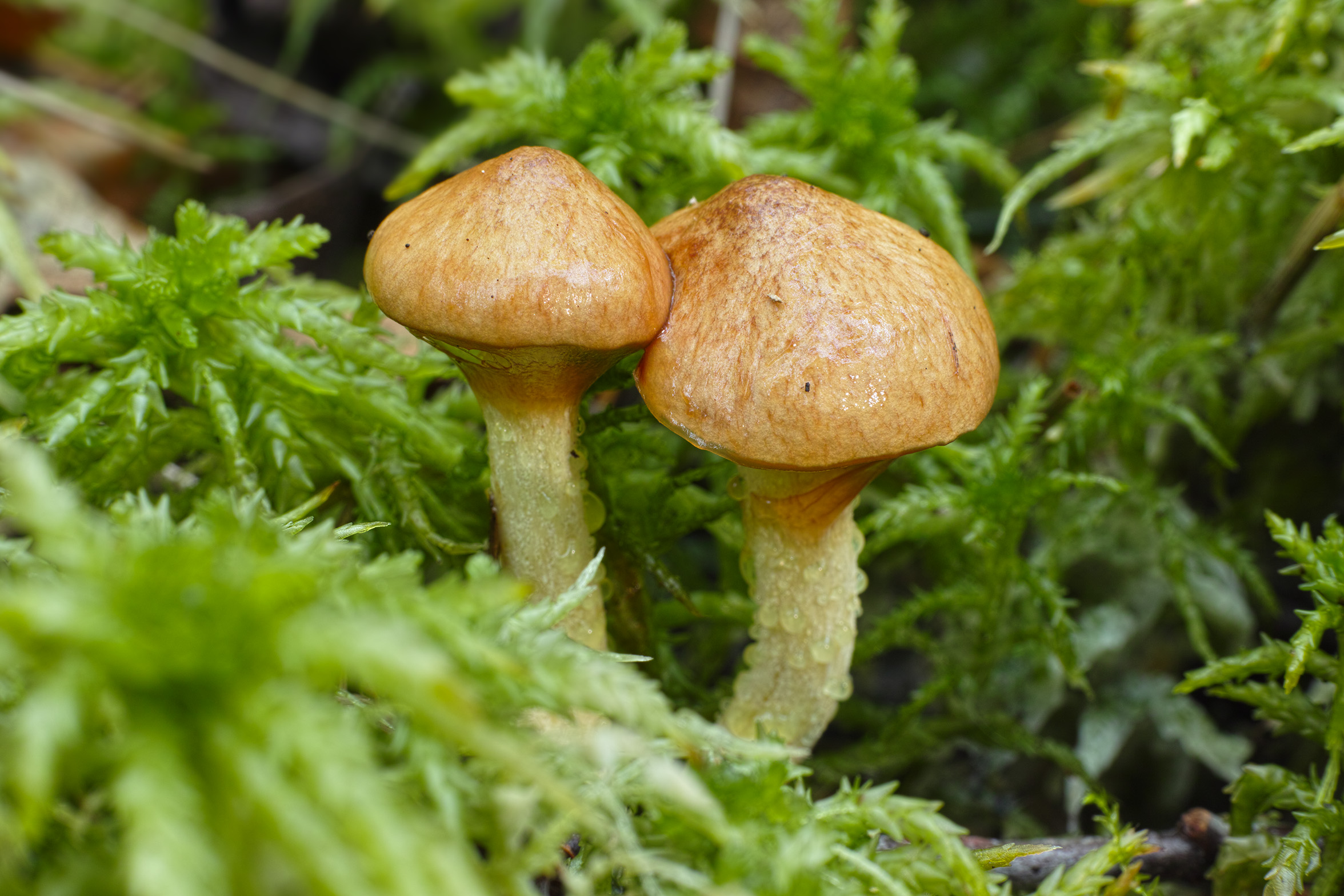

Scientific classification
- Domain: Eukaryota
- Kingdom: Fungi
- Division: Basidiomycota
- Class: Agaricomycetes
- Order: Boletales
- Family: Suillaceae
- Genus: Suillus
- Species: S. flavidus

Binomial name
- Suillus flavidus (Fr.) J.Presl (1846)

Synonyms
- Boletus flavidus Fr. (1815); Boletus pulchellus Fr. (1874); Viscipellis flavida (Fr.) Quél. (1886); Ixocomus flavidus (Fr.) Quél. (1888); Boletopsis flavidus (Fr.) Henn. (1898); Viscipellis pulchella (Fr.) Quél. (1886); Boletopsis pulchella (Fr.) Henn. (1898); Boletus elegans var. pulchellus (Fr.) Rea (1922); Suillus grevillei var. pulchellus (Fr.) Rea (1922); Suillus umbonatus

= Suillus flavidus =

Species of fungus

Suillus flavidus is a bolete mushroom in the genus Suillus native to Europe. It is considered endangered in the Czech Republic and Switzerland. It is also considered edible, but with an unpleasant taste.
