= Suillus triacicularis =

Scientific classification
- Domain: Eukaryota
- Kingdom: Fungi
- Division: Basidiomycota
- Class: Agaricomycetes
- Order: Boletales
- Family: Suillaceae
- Genus: Suillus
- Species: S. triacicularis

Binomial name
- Suillus triacicularis B.Verma & M.S.Reddy (2014)

Species of fungus

Suillus triacicularis is a species of bolete fungus in the family Suillaceae. Described as new to science in 2014, it is found in the northwestern Himalayas, India, where it grows in association with Pinus roxburghii.
