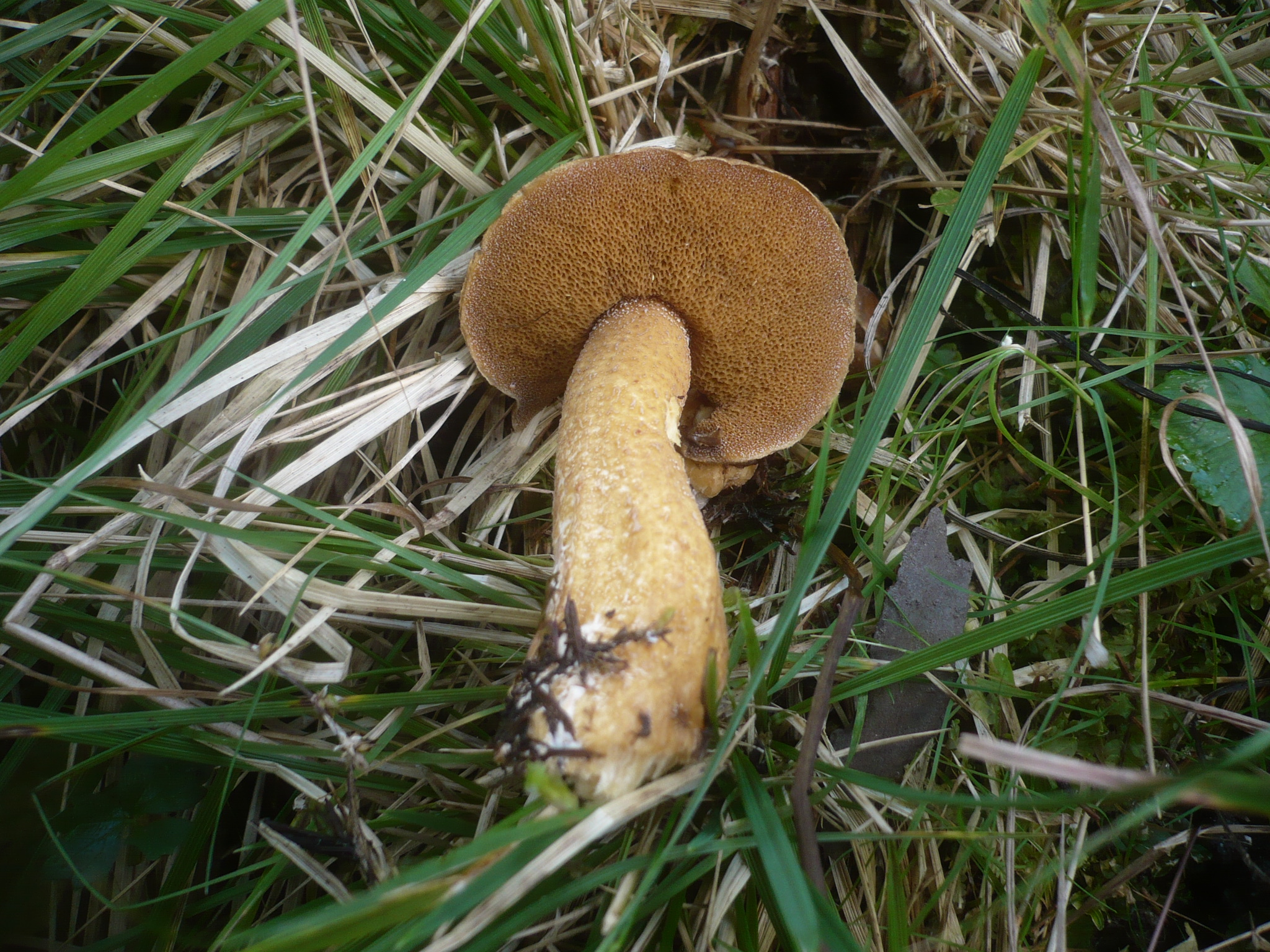

Scientific classification
- Kingdom: Fungi
- Division: Basidiomycota
- Class: Agaricomycetes
- Order: Boletales
- Family: Suillaceae
- Genus: Suillus
- Species: S. plorans

Binomial name
- Suillus plorans (Rolland) Kuntze (1898)

Synonyms
- Boletus plorans Rolland (1889)

= Suillus plorans =

Species of fungus

Suillus plorans is an edible species of mushroom in the genus Suillus. The species was originally named Boletus plorans by Léon Louis Rolland before transferred to Suillus by Otto Kuntze in 1898. Although known as a predominantly European fungus, the species was recorded in Mexico in 1982.
