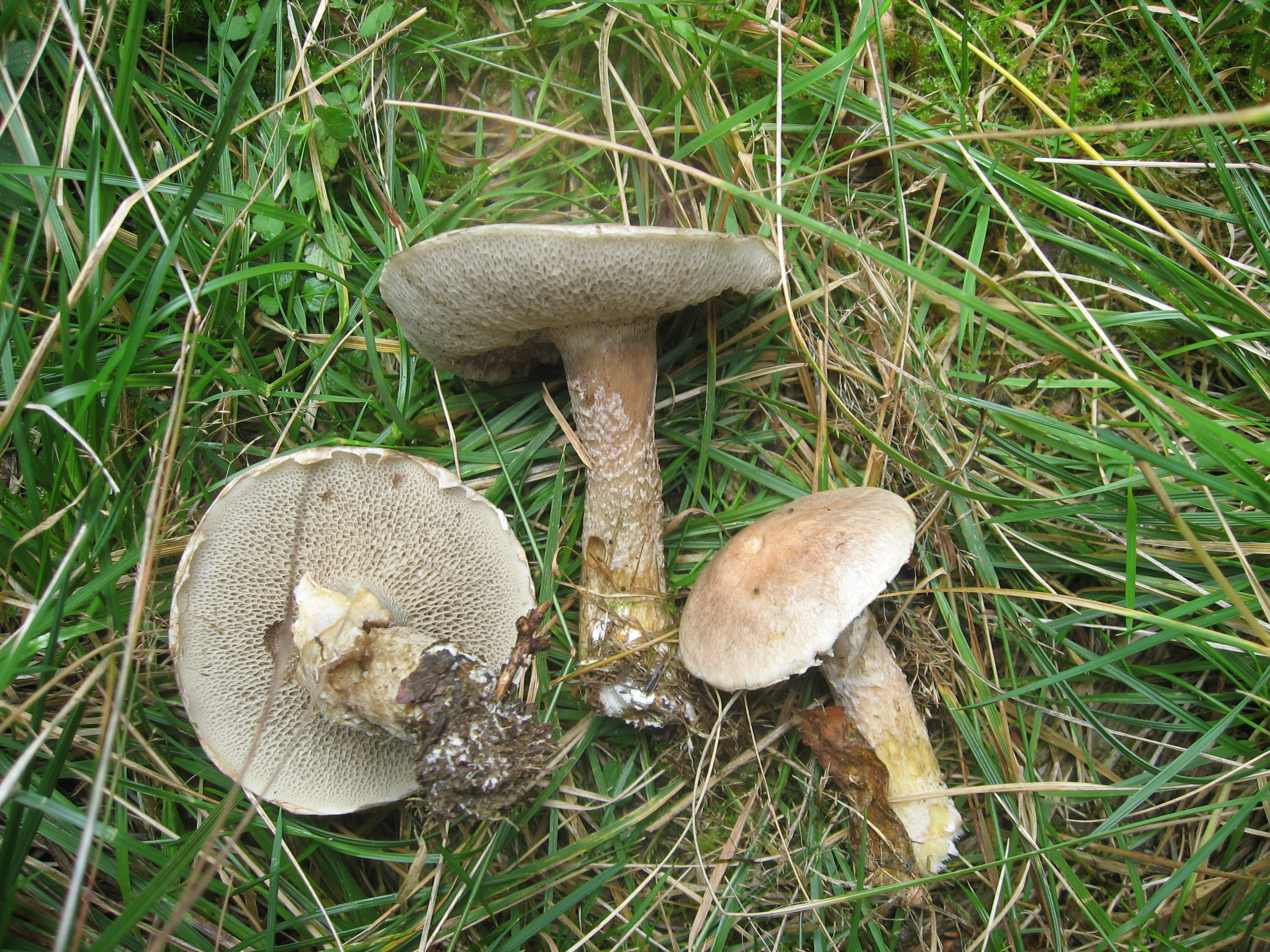

Scientific classification
- Kingdom: Fungi
- Division: Basidiomycota
- Class: Agaricomycetes
- Order: Boletales
- Family: Suillaceae
- Genus: Suillus
- Species: S. viscidus

Binomial name
- Suillus viscidus (L.) Roussel 1796

Synonyms
- Suillus aeruginascens Secr. ex Snell; Suillus laricinus (Berk.) Kuntze; Ixocomus viscidus (Fr. & Hök) Quél.

= Suillus viscidus =

Species of fungus

Suillus viscidus
- Mycological characteristics
- Pores on hymenium
- Cap is convex
- Hymenium is decurrent
- Stipe has a ring
- Spore print is brown
- Ecology is mycorrhizal
- Edibility is edible

Suillus viscidus (commonly known as the sticky bolete) is an edible, uncommon mushroom in the genus Suillus. It associates with larch and is found throughout Europe and in Japan.

== Description ==
The cap is hemispherical when young, later convex to flat, whitish grey or darker. It is up to 12 cm in diameter. It is slimy, and blotchy when old. The large, angular pores on the underside of the cap are coloured pallid to yellowish at first, but become darker with maturity. Young specimens bear a whitish partial veil which soon shreds, sometimes leaving fragments on the cap edge. The tubes are concolorous, and have a slightly decurrent stem attachment. The stem bears a thin, slimy, dark-coloured ring in the uppermost part of the stem which is sometimes lost in mature specimens. The stem is divided by the ring into a short lighter, yellowish section above, and a duller, greyish section below, which is viscid. The flesh is whitish, staining bluish, very soft and has a mild or non-distinct taste.

The spores are clay-coloured and ellipsoid or subfusiform in shape. Their dimensions are 10–12 by 4–5.5 μm.

It is an edible mushroom of low quality.

== Habitat ==
Suillus viscidus forms an ectomycorrhizal association with larch (Larix) specifically, and its distribution is thus limited by the range of the host tree. It occurs throughout Europe, and also in Japan. In Europe, it is considered an uncommon to rare fungus and it is to be found in the same habitat as the common larch bolete, Suillus grevillei, and also the rare Suillus tridentinus. Fruiting bodies are found in groups among grass under larch, from summer to autumn.
