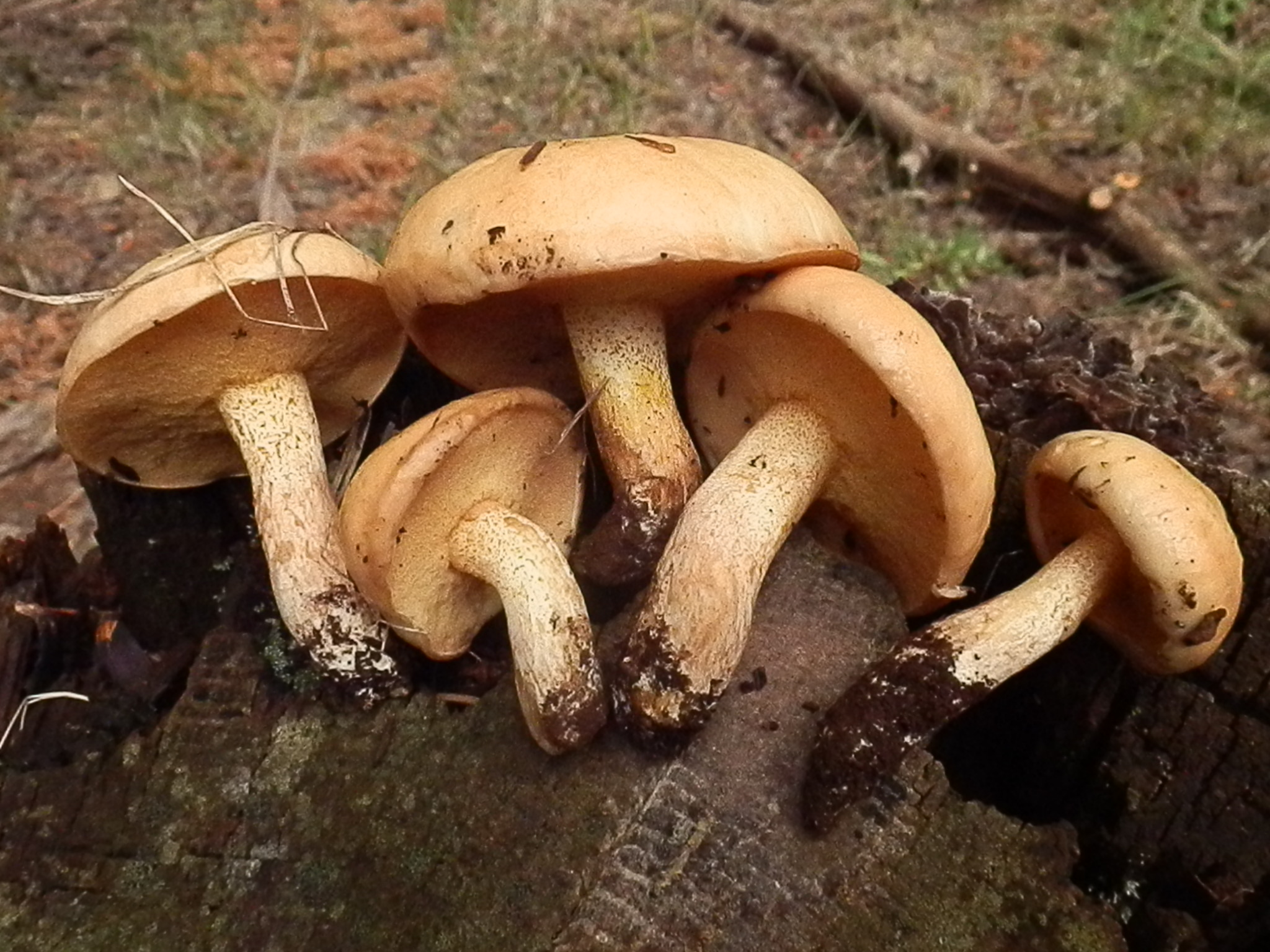

Scientific classification
- Domain: Eukaryota
- Kingdom: Fungi
- Division: Basidiomycota
- Class: Agaricomycetes
- Order: Boletales
- Family: Suillaceae
- Genus: Suillus
- Species: S. kaibabensis

Binomial name
- Suillus kaibabensis Thiers

= Suillus kaibabensis =

Species of fungus

Suillus kaibabensis Mycological characteristics
- Pores on hymenium
- Cap is convex
- Hymenium is adnate
- Stipe is bare
- Spore print is brown
- Ecology is mycorrhizal
- Edibility is edible

Suillus kaibabensis is a species of fungus in the family Boletaceae. The species was first described scientifically by American mycologist Harry D. Thiers.

== Description ==
Suillus kaibabensis is a hardy yellow member of the genus Suillus. While yellow is the primary color, it can also include brown and white tones in varying degrees as well. This mushroom has a stem around 2–4 cm long, and 1–2 cm thick. The cap is broad and convex to flat, typical of many species of boletes. The stipe is bare, spotted with olive brown and can be reddish-brown at the base. The pores are yellowish-brown that can turn a salmon color with age.

== Taxonomy ==
This species was first described by Harry D. Thiers in 1978. This species bears close resemblance to Suillus granulatus. The species has a very common look to other Suillus, and is rather difficult to tell apart other than the close association with Ponderosa pine. An easy identifier to use for Suillus is Suillus Filter.

== Ecology ==
Suillus kaibabensis grows in the four corners region of Arizona, New Mexico, Utah, and Colorado. This species exclusively prefers Ponderosa pine. It is mycorrhizal, and requires these trees to survive. It produces fruiting bodies during the wetter season of late July to September.

== See also ==
- List of Boletus species
- List of North American boletes
