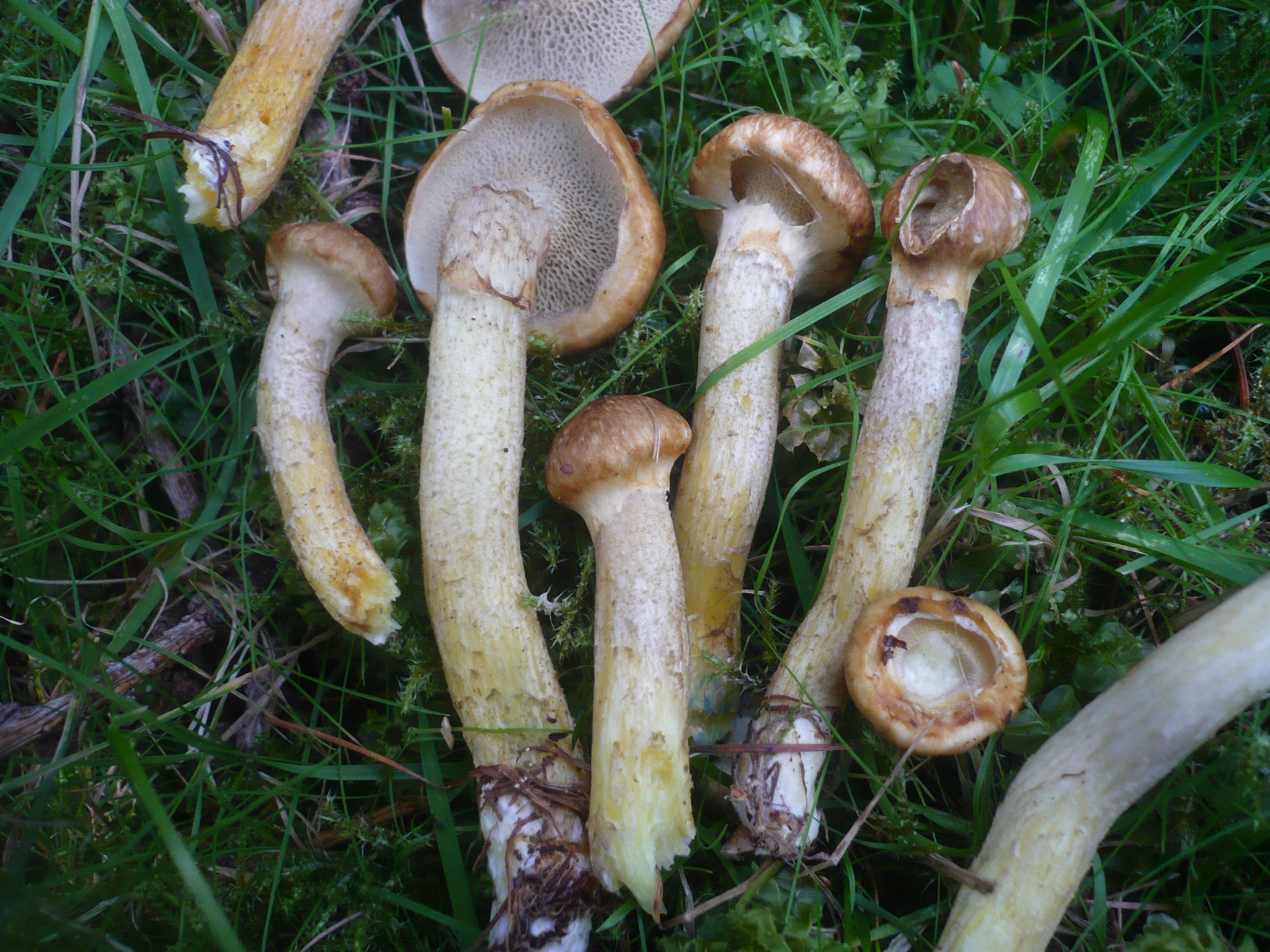

Scientific classification
- Domain: Eukaryota
- Kingdom: Fungi
- Division: Basidiomycota
- Class: Agaricomycetes
- Order: Boletales
- Family: Suillaceae
- Genus: Suillus
- Species: S. bresadolae

Binomial name
- Suillus bresadolae (Quél.) Gerhold (1985)

Synonyms
- Boletopsis bresadolae (Quél.) Henn., in Engler & Prantl, Nat. Pflanzenfam., Teil. I (Leipzig) 1(1**): 195 (1898) [1900]; Boletus bresadolae Quél., Fung. trident. 1(1): 13 (1881); Boletus viscidus var. bresadolae (Quél.) Costantin & L.M. Dufour, Nouv. Fl. Champ., Edn 1 (Paris): 150 (1891); Ixocomus bresadolae (Quél.) Quél., Fl. mycol. France (Paris): 416 (1888); Ixocomus viscidus var. bresadolae (Quél.) Quél., Fl. mycol. France (Paris): 416 (1888); Solenia bresadolae (Quél.) Kuntze, Revis. gen. pl. (Leipzig) 3(3): 522 (1898); Suillus aeruginascens var. bresadolae (Quél.) M.M. Moser, in Gams, Kl. Krypt.-Fl., Edn 3 (Stuttgart) 2b/2: 42 (1967); Suillus aeruginascens var. nueschii Singer ex Schmid-Heckel, Forschungsberichte Nationalpark Berchtesgarden 8: 103 (1985); Suillus bresadolae f. flavogriseus (Cazzoli & Consiglio) Klofac, Öst. Z. Pilzk. 22: 217 (2013); Suillus bresadolae var. flavogriseus Cazzoli & Consiglio, Fungo 15(Suppl. 1-3): 25 (1997) [1996]; Suillus laricinus var. bresadolae (Quél.) Alessio, Boletus Dill. ex L. (Saronno): 344 (1985); Suillus nueschii Singer, Sydowia 15(1-6): 82 (1962) [1961]; Suillus nueschii var. caerulescens Singer, Sydowia 15(1-6): 82 (1962) [1961]; Suillus viscidus var. bresadolae (Quél.) Bon, Docums Mycol. 19(no. 74): 61 (1988); Viscipellis bresadolae (Quél.) Quél., Enchir. fung. (Paris): 156 (1886)

= Suillus bresadolae =

Species of fungus

Suillus bresadolae is a rare species of mushroom in the genus Suillus. A European species, it was first described scientifically by Lucien Quélet in 1887 as Boletus bresadolae and given its current name in 1985 by Gerhold.
