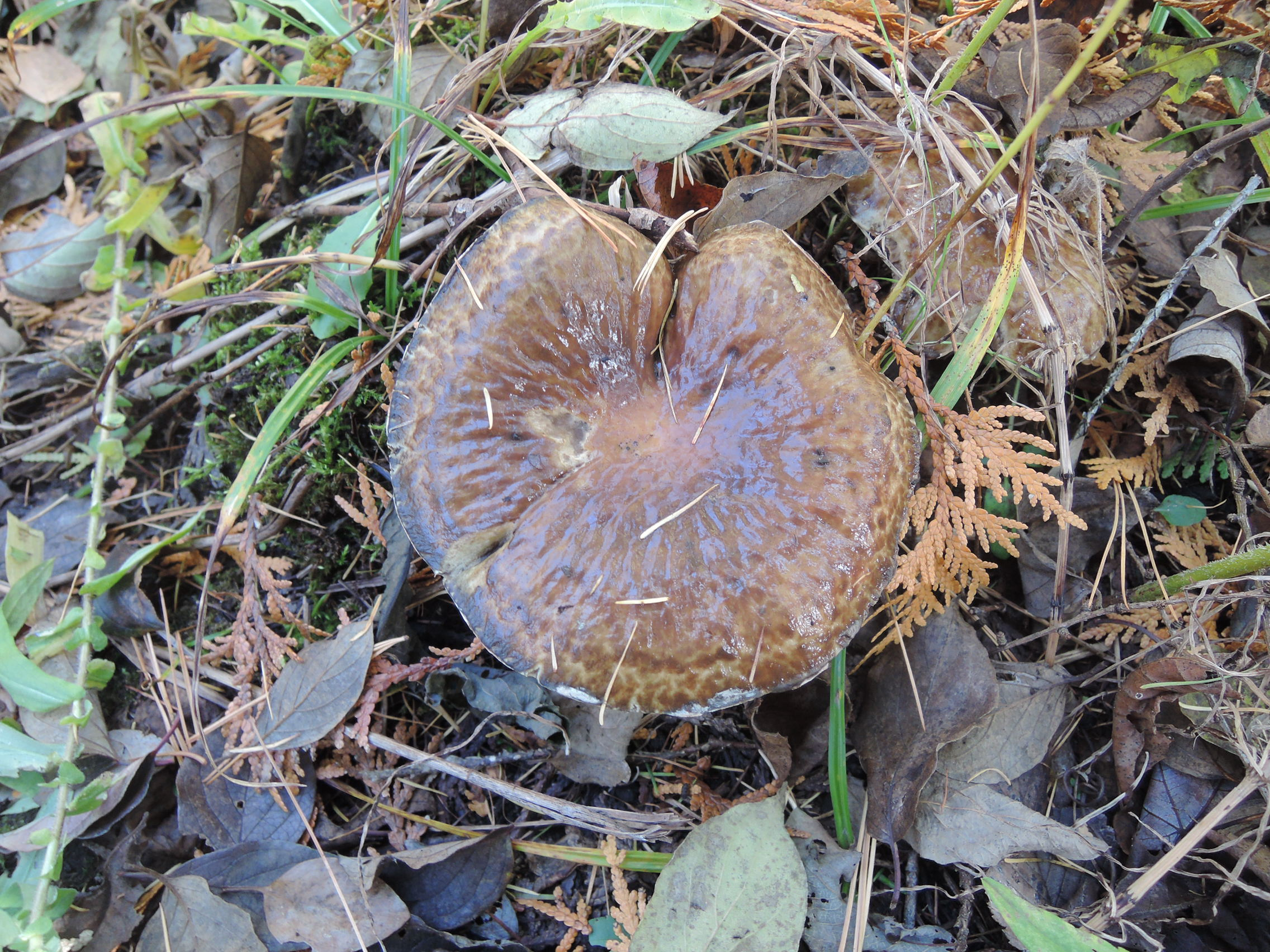

Scientific classification
- Domain: Eukaryota
- Kingdom: Fungi
- Division: Basidiomycota
- Class: Agaricomycetes
- Order: Boletales
- Family: Suillaceae
- Genus: Suillus
- Species: S. serotinus

Binomial name
- Suillus serotinus (Frost) Kretzer & T.D.Bruns (1996)

Synonyms
- Boletus serotinus Frost (1874); Boletus larignus Britzelm. (1893); Boletopsis serotina (Frost) Henn. (1898); Boletus bresadolae var. larignus (Britzelm.) Maire (1912); Boletopsis larigna (Britzelm.) Singer (1922); Fuscoboletinus serotinus (Frost) A.H.Sm. & Thiers (1971)

= Suillus serotinus =

Species of fungus

Suillus serotinus is a species of bolete fungus found in eastern North America. Originally described as a species of Boletus by American botanist Charles Christopher Frost in 1874, it was transferred to Suillus in 1996. The bolete has a dark red brown and sticky cap up to 12 cm (4.7 in) in diameter. The pore surface is initially white before turning reddish brown in age; the angular pores number from 1 to 3 per millimeter. Mushroom flesh slowly stains bluish after injury, later becoming purplish gray then finally reddish brown. The fungus grows in a mycorrhizal association with larch and fruits on the ground scattered or in groups. The spore print is purplish brown; spores are oblong to ellipsoid, smooth, and measure 8–12 by 4–5 μm. The fruit bodies are edible, but lack any distinctive taste or odor.

== See also ==
- List of North American boletes
