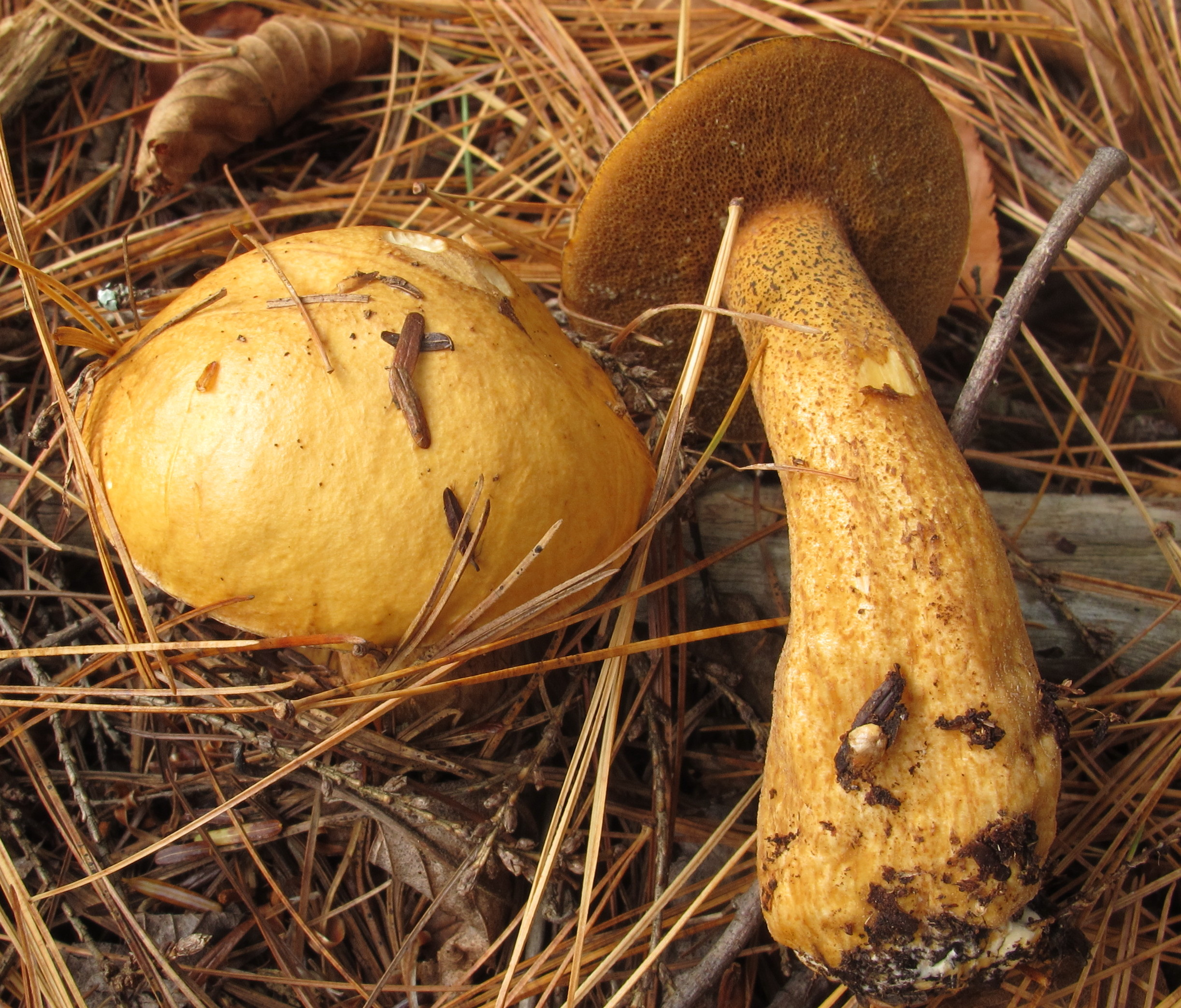

Scientific classification
- Kingdom: Fungi
- Division: Basidiomycota
- Class: Agaricomycetes
- Order: Boletales
- Family: Suillaceae
- Genus: Suillus
- Species: S. punctipes

Binomial name
- Suillus punctipes (Peck) Singer (1945)

Synonyms
- Boletus punctipes Peck (1878); Ixocomus punctipes (Peck) Singer (1942)

= Suillus punctipes =

Species of fungus

Suillus punctipes, commonly known as the spicy suillus, is a bolete fungus in the family Suillaceae.

== Taxonomy ==
The fungus was originally described in 1878 by American mycologist Charles Horton Peck as a species of Boletus. Collected from Gansevoort, New York, Peck described its distinguishing features as "its rhubarb-colored stem thickened at the base and the brownish color of the young hymenium". Rolf Singer transferred it to Suillus in 1945.

== Habitat and distribution ==
The bolete has been recorded from Taiwan.

== Uses ==
The species is edible but very soft.

== See also ==
- List of North American boletes
