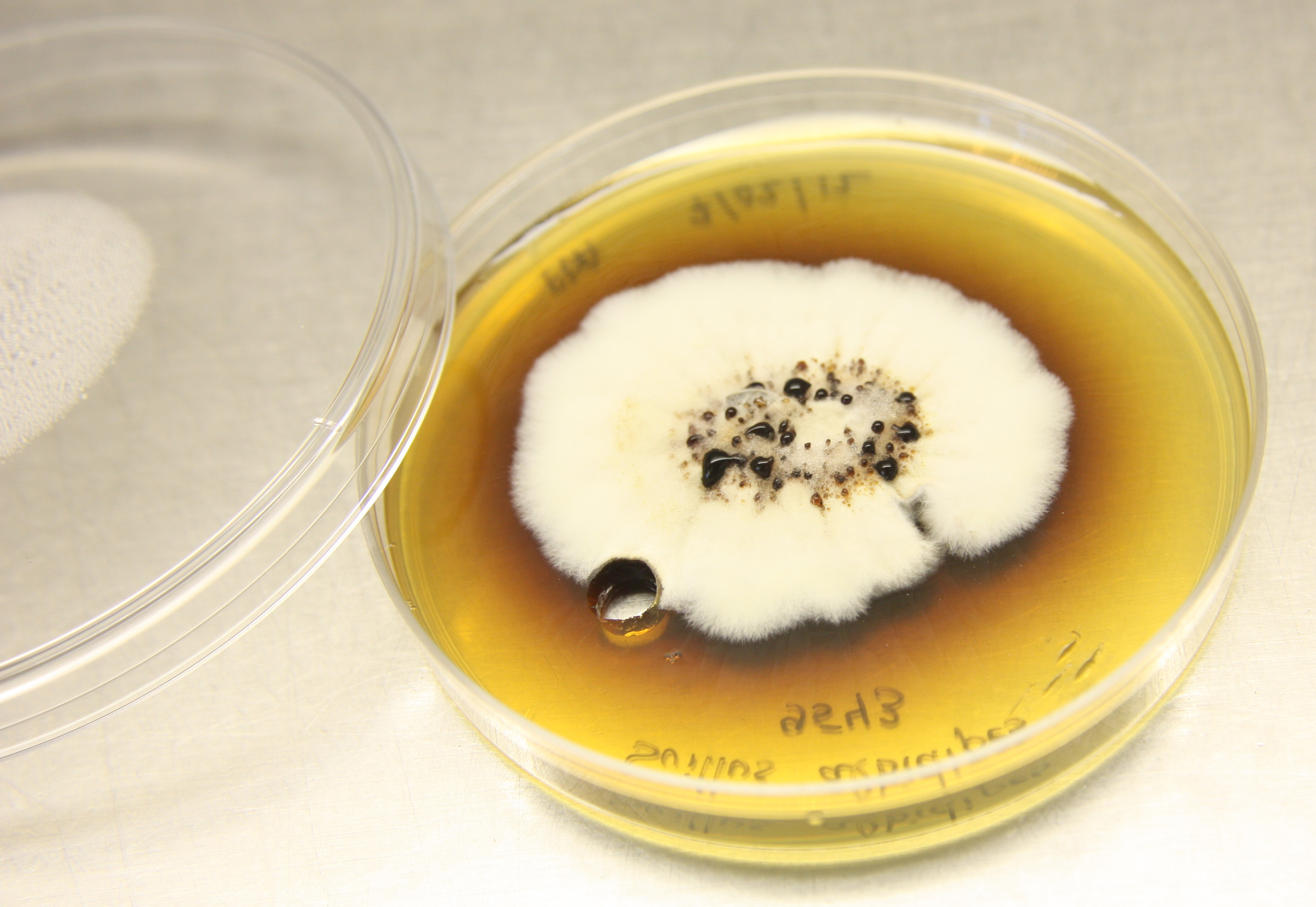
- Suillus albidipes cultured on potato dextrose agar in a petri dish

Scientific classification
- Domain: Eukaryota
- Kingdom: Fungi
- Division: Basidiomycota
- Class: Agaricomycetes
- Order: Boletales
- Family: Suillaceae
- Genus: Suillus
- Species: S. albidipes

Binomial name
- Suillus albidipes (Peck) Singer

= Suillus albidipes =

Species of fungus

Suillus albidipes is a species of edible mushroom in the genus Suillus native to North America.

== See also ==
- List of North American boletes
