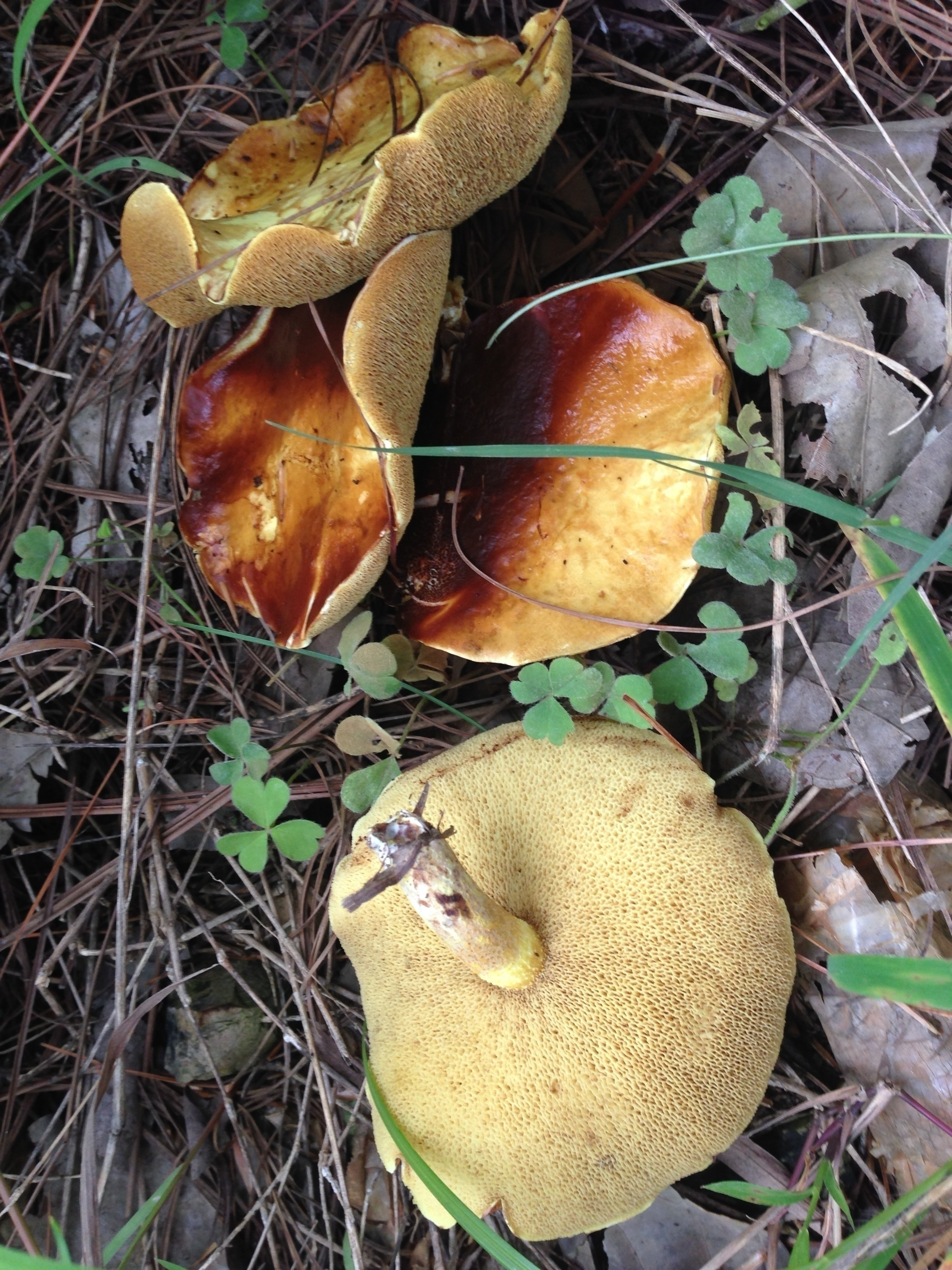

Scientific classification
- Domain: Eukaryota
- Kingdom: Fungi
- Division: Basidiomycota
- Class: Agaricomycetes
- Order: Boletales
- Family: Suillaceae
- Genus: Suillus
- Species: S. kunmingensis

Binomial name
- Suillus kunmingensis (W.F.Chiu) Q.B.Wang & Y.J.Yao (2004)

Synonyms
- Boletinus kunmingensis W.F.Chiu (1948)

= Suillus kunmingensis =

Species of fungus

Suillus kunmingensis is a species of bolete fungus in the family Suillaceae. It was described as new to science in 1948 by Wei-Fan Chiu as a species of Boletinus; Wang and Yao transferred it to the genus Suillus in a 2004 nomenclatural revision of several Chinese boletes. The species epithet alludes to the type locality—Kunming, China—where the first scientific collections of the bolete were made in November, 1941. It has also been recorded from Sichuan. Similar Suillus species include S. pinetorum and S. punctatipes.
