= Suillus flavogranulatus =

Scientific classification
- Domain: Eukaryota
- Kingdom: Fungi
- Division: Basidiomycota
- Class: Agaricomycetes
- Order: Boletales
- Family: Suillaceae
- Genus: Suillus
- Species: S. flavogranulatus

Binomial name
- Suillus flavogranulatus A.H.Sm., Thiers & O.K.Mill. (1965)

Species of fungus

Suillus flavogranulatus is a bolete mushroom in the genus Suillus native to North America. It was described as new to science in 1965 by mycologists Alexander H. Smith, Harry Delbert Thiers, and Orson K. Miller.

== See also ==
- List of North American boletes
