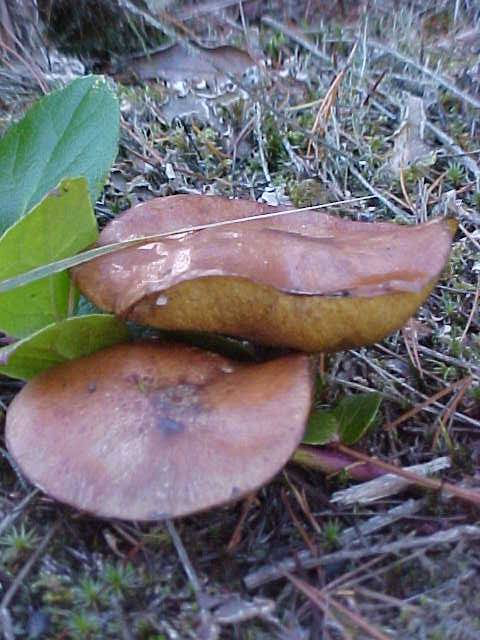

Scientific classification
- Domain: Eukaryota
- Kingdom: Fungi
- Division: Basidiomycota
- Class: Agaricomycetes
- Order: Boletales
- Family: Suillaceae
- Genus: Suillus
- Species: S. subluteus

Binomial name
- Suillus subluteus (Peck) Snell (1944)

Synonyms
- Boletus subluteus Peck (1887); Ixocomus subluteus (Peck) E.-J.Gilbert (1931)

= Suillus subluteus =

Species of fungus

Suillus subluteus is a species of mushroom in the genus Suillus. First described as Boletus subluteus by Charles Horton Peck in 1887, it was transferred to Suillus by Wally Snell in 1944. It is found in North America.
