= Suillus holomaculatus =

Scientific classification
- Domain: Eukaryota
- Kingdom: Fungi
- Division: Basidiomycota
- Class: Agaricomycetes
- Order: Boletales
- Family: Suillaceae
- Genus: Suillus
- Species: S. holomaculatus

Binomial name
- Suillus holomaculatus Klofac & Hauskn. (2008)

Species of fungus

Suillus holomaculatus is a species of bolete fungus in the family Suillaceae. Found in Mauritius, where it grows in association with Pinus radiata, it was described as new to science in 2008.
