= Suillus abietinus =

Scientific classification
- Domain: Eukaryota
- Kingdom: Fungi
- Division: Basidiomycota
- Class: Agaricomycetes
- Order: Boletales
- Family: Suillaceae
- Genus: Suillus
- Species: S. abietinus

Binomial name
- Suillus abietinus Pantidou & Watling (1970)

Species of fungus

Suillus abietinus is a species of edible mushroom in the genus Suillus. Found in Greece, it was described as new to science in 1970 by Maria Pantidou and Roy Watling from collections made in Vytina, Arkadia.
