= Suillus helenae =

Scientific classification
- Domain: Eukaryota
- Kingdom: Fungi
- Division: Basidiomycota
- Class: Agaricomycetes
- Order: Boletales
- Family: Suillaceae
- Genus: Suillus
- Species: S. helenae

Binomial name
- Suillus helenae Thiers & A.H.Sm. (1974)

Species of fungus

Suillus helenae is a species of bolete fungus in the genus Suillus. Found in the United States, it was described as new to science in 1974 by mycologists Harry Delbert Thiers and Alexander H. Smith. The type collection was made in Oregon, where the fungus was found fruiting in dense clusters under Pinus contorta. Fruitbodies have conical to bell-shaped caps measuring 1.5–4 cm (0.6–1.6 in) in diameter. The stipe, which measures 3–6 cm (1.2–2.4 in) long by 4–8 mm (0.2–0.3 in) thick, has glandular dots on its yellowish surface. The spore print is brown; spores are thin-walled, ellipsoid to somewhat cylindrical, with dimensions of 6.5–9.5 by 2.8–4.0 μm.
