= Suillus cavipoides =

Scientific classification
- Kingdom: Fungi
- Division: Basidiomycota
- Class: Agaricomycetes
- Order: Boletales
- Family: Suillaceae
- Genus: Suillus
- Species: S. cavipoides

Binomial name
- Suillus cavipoides (Z.S.Bi & G.Y.Zheng) Q.B.Wang & Y.J.Yao (2004)

Synonyms
- Boletinus cavipoides Z.S. Bi & G.Y.Zheng (1982)

Species of fungus

Suillus cavipoides is a bolete mushroom in the genus Suillus native to China. Initially described as Boletinus cavipoides, it was transferred by Wang and Yao to the genus Suillus in a 2004 nomenclatural revision of several Chinese boletes.
