= Suillus chiapasensis =

Scientific classification
- Kingdom: Fungi
- Division: Basidiomycota
- Class: Agaricomycetes
- Order: Boletales
- Family: Suillaceae
- Genus: Suillus
- Species: S. chiapasensis

Binomial name
- Suillus chiapasensis Singer (1973)

Species of bolete fungus found in Mexico

Suillus chiapasensis is a species of bolete fungus in the family Suillaceae. Found in Mexico, it was described as new to science in 1973 by mycologist Rolf Singer. The type collection was made in Chiapas, west of San Cristóbal de las Casas, on 2 August 1969.

== See also ==
- List of North American boletes
