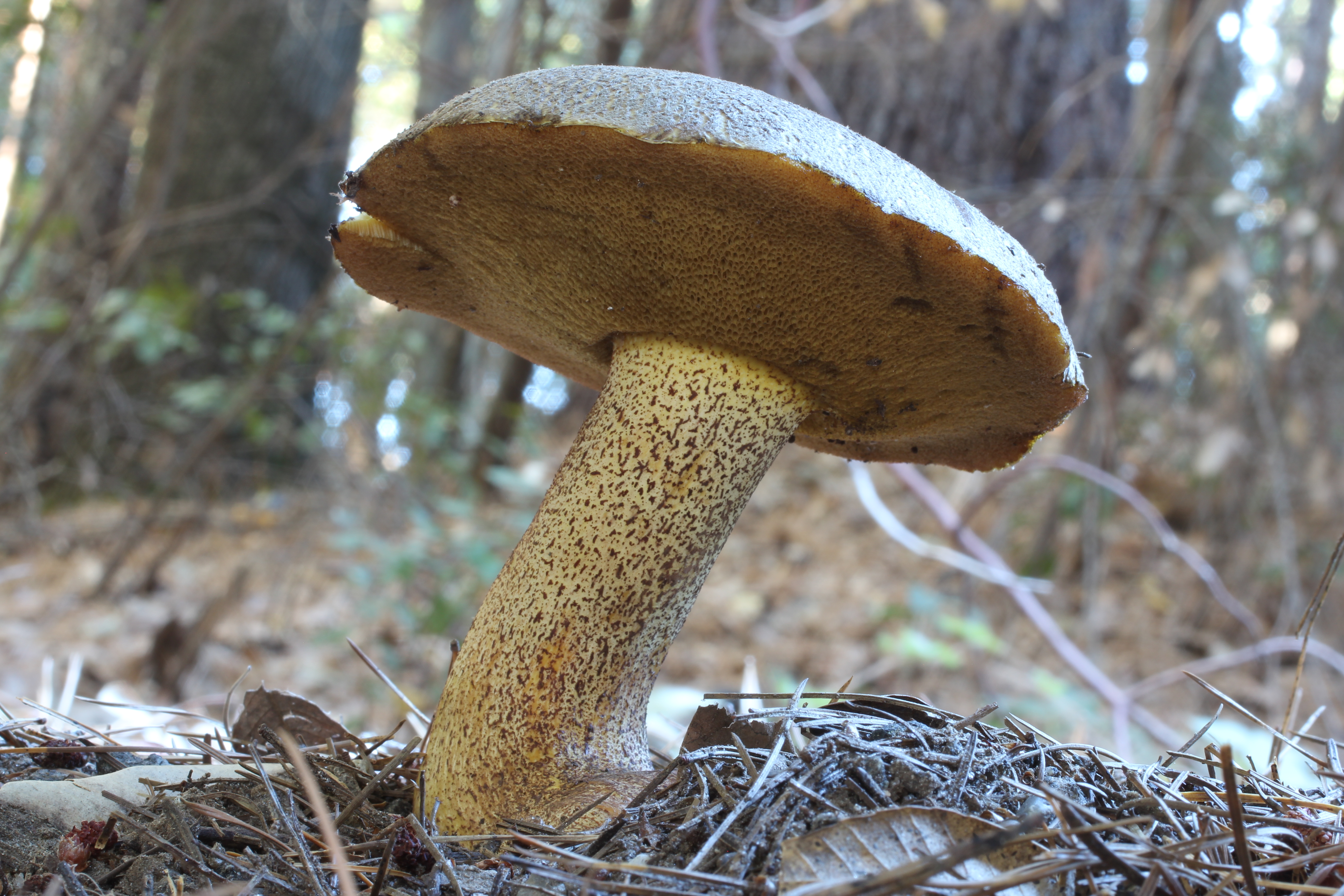

Conservation status
- Least Concern (IUCN 3.1)

Scientific classification
- Kingdom: Fungi
- Division: Basidiomycota
- Class: Agaricomycetes
- Order: Boletales
- Family: Suillaceae
- Genus: Suillus
- Species: S. fuscotomentosus

Binomial name
- Suillus fuscotomentosus Thiers & A.H.Sm. (1964)

= Suillus fuscotomentosus =

Species of fungus

Suillus fuscotomentosus
- Mycological characteristics
- Pores on hymenium
- Cap is convex or flat
- Stipe is bare
- Spore print is olive to brown
- Ecology is mycorrhizal
- Edibility is edible

Suillus fuscotomentosus, commonly known as the poor man's slippery jack, is a species of fungus in the genus Suillus. Found in western North America, it was described as new to science in 1964 by mycologists Harry Delbert Thiers and Alexander H. Smith.

The cap is up to 15 centimetres (6 in) wide, with dark fibrils on a buff background. The flesh is orangish and does not turn blue when bruised. The pores are yellowish. The stem is up to 12 cm long and 3 cm thick. The spore print is brownish.

It usually grows under three-needle pines, such as ponderosa and Monterey pine. Although edible, it is considered of poor quality, often placing last in taste tests of local boletes.

== See also ==
- List of North American boletes
