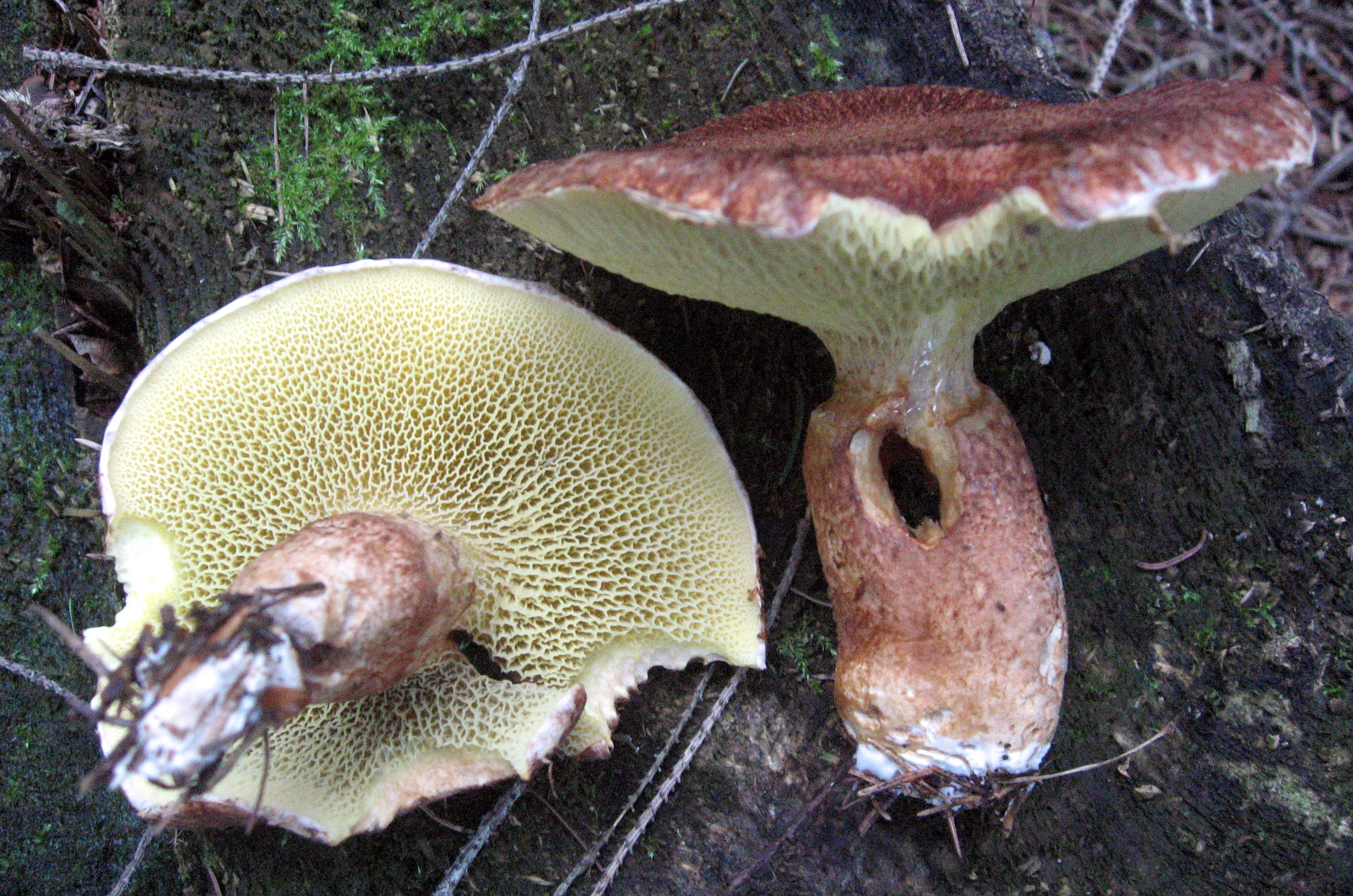

Scientific classification
- Domain: Eukaryota
- Kingdom: Fungi
- Division: Basidiomycota
- Class: Agaricomycetes
- Order: Boletales
- Family: Suillaceae
- Genus: Suillus
- Species: S. cavipes

Binomial name
- Suillus cavipes (Opat.) A.H.Sm. & Thiers (1964)

Synonyms
- Boletus cavipes Opat. (1836); Boletinus cavipes (Opat.) Kalchbr. (1867); Euryporus cavipes (Opat.) Quél. (1886); Boletopsis cavipes (Opat.) Henn. (1900)

= Suillus cavipes =

Species of fungus

Suillus cavipes Mycological characteristics
- Pores on hymenium
- Cap is convex
- Hymenium is adnate
- Stipe is bare
- Ecology is mycorrhizal
- Edibility is edible

Suillus cavipes, commonly known as the hollow foot is a species of mushroom in the genus Suillus. The epithet cavipes (Latin: 'hollow foot') refers to the hollow stem.

The brownish cap is up to 12 centimetres (4 3/4 in) wide, dry, fibrillose, sometimes with veil remnants on the edge. The pores are buff and usually decurrent. The stipe is up to 9 cm long and 2 cm thick, yellowish above, sometimes with a slight ring, and cap-colored below. The flesh is whitish and firm.

It is found in Europe and North America. It is associated with larch in the Pacific Northwest. It is edible.

== See also ==
- List of North American boletes
