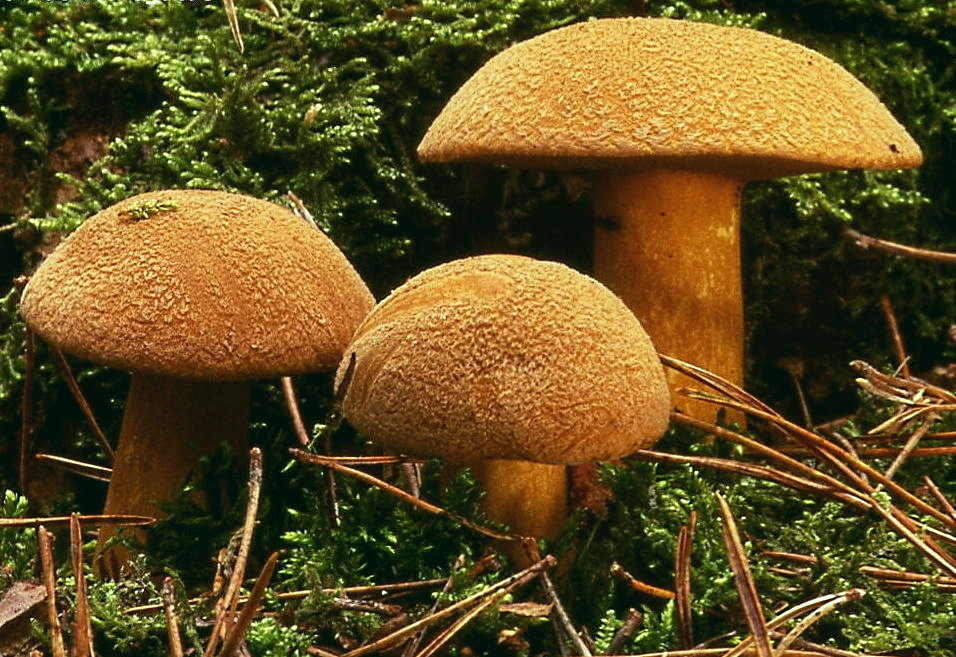

Conservation status
- Least Concern (IUCN 3.1)

Scientific classification
- Kingdom: Fungi
- Division: Basidiomycota
- Class: Agaricomycetes
- Order: Boletales
- Family: Suillaceae
- Genus: Suillus
- Species: S. variegatus

Binomial name
- Suillus variegatus (Sw.) Kuntze (1898)

Synonyms
- Boletus variegatus Sw. (1810); Boletus aureus Schaeff. (1774)

= Suillus variegatus =

Species of fungus

Suillus variegatus Mycological characteristics
- Pores on hymenium
- Cap is convex
- Stipe is bare
- Spore print is brown
- Ecology is mycorrhizal
- Edibility is edible

Suillus variegatus, commonly called the velvet bolete or variegated bolete, is a species of edible mushroom in the genus Suillus. Like all bolete-like species it has tubes, and pores, instead of gills under its cap. The mushroom forms a mycorrhizal relationship with pine and occurs in North America and Eurasia.

== Description ==
The cap is 6 – 13 cm in diameter. It is rusty to tawny, or ochraceous, and has a velvety or downy feel when young. As it matures the surface becomes smoother, even greasy, and tacky in wet periods. The stem is ochre, more yellow towards the top, and may be flushed with rust at the base. It is sometimes slightly bulbous. The flesh is pale lemon, and may turn very slightly blue on cutting. The pores are ochre, becoming more cinnamon later, and the spore print is walnut brown. Said to smell like an 'Earth ball' fungus (Scleroderma).

The variegatic acid is an orange pigment first isolated from Suillus variegatus. It has strong antioxidant properties, and a nonspecific inhibitory effect on cytochrome P450 enzymes. When mushroom tissue containing variegatic acid is exposed to air, the chemical is enzymatically oxidized to blue quinone methide anions.

== Distribution and habitat ==
Suillus variegatus appears frequently with, and is mycorrhizal with two needle pine trees in late summer. It is often found with heathers, and other acid loving plants, on sandy soils. It is widespread in Europe, nearer parts of Asia, and North America.

== Edibility ==
Suillus variegatus is edible, but is said to smell unpleasant, with a somewhat metallic taste. It was one of the most productive edible wild mushroom species in Finland in the 1970s.

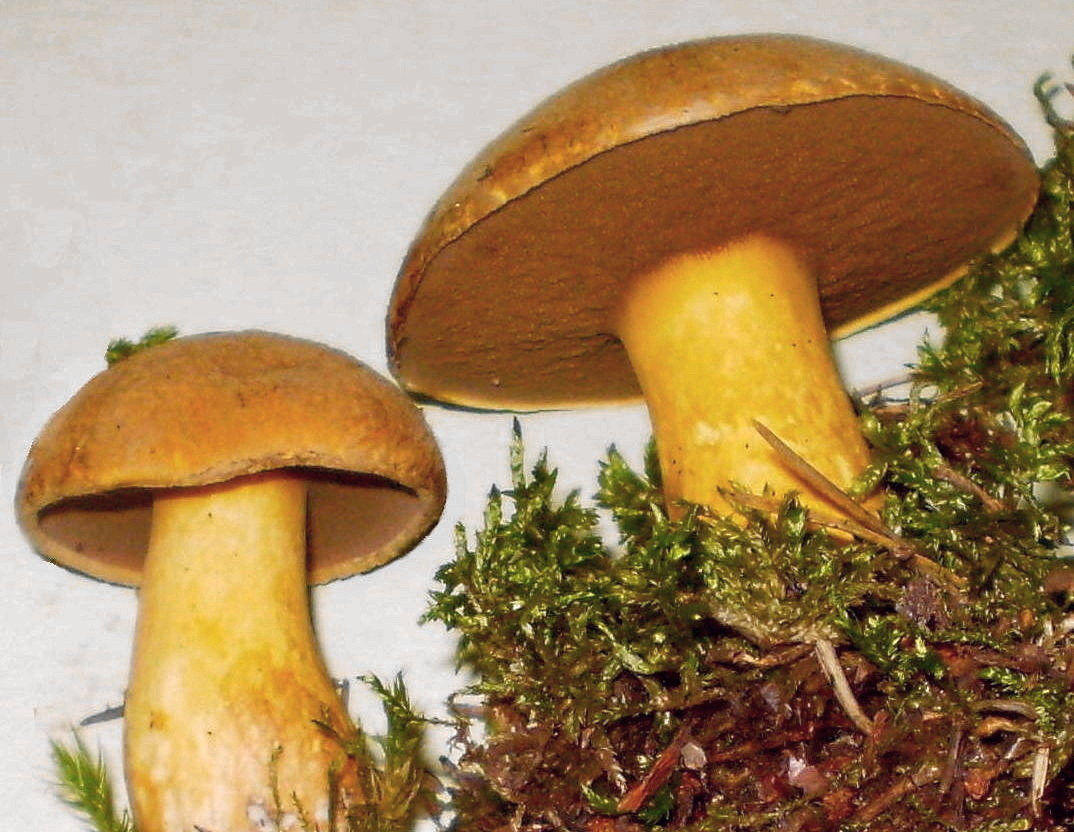
Image of S.variegatus showing cinnamon pores
