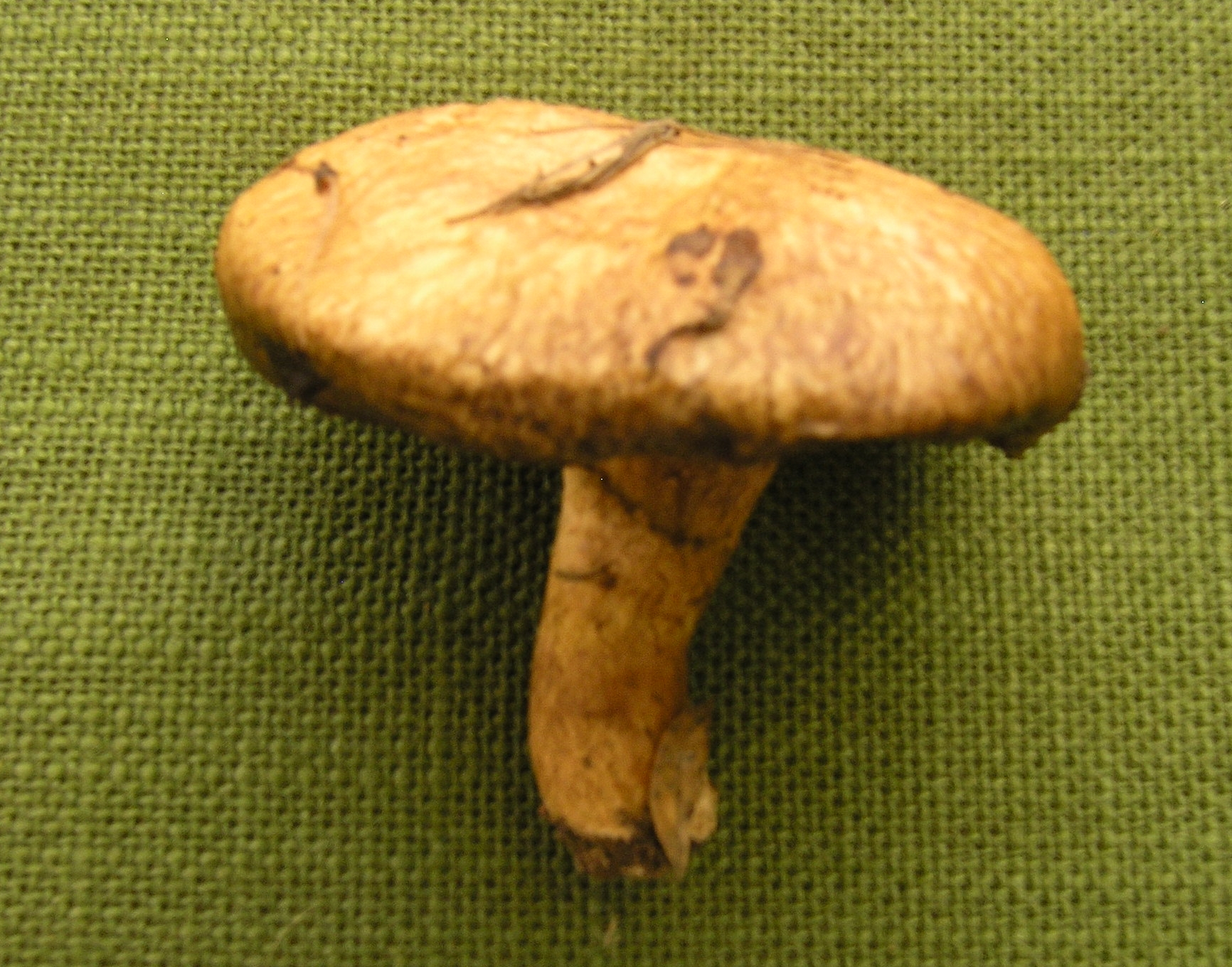

Scientific classification
- Domain: Eukaryota
- Kingdom: Fungi
- Division: Basidiomycota
- Class: Agaricomycetes
- Order: Boletales
- Family: Suillaceae
- Genus: Suillus
- Species: S. tridentinus

Binomial name
- Suillus tridentinus (Bres.) Singer (1945)

Synonyms
- Boletus tridentinus Bres. (1881)

= Suillus tridentinus =

Species of fungus

Suillus tridentinus, the orange larch bolete, is an uncommon, edible mushroom in the genus Suillus, found mainly at higher altitudes beneath larches on chalk. It can be found together with larch boletes, but more scarce.

The bolete is considered endangered in the Czech Republic.

== Description ==
The cap is convex, orange to rusty red, slimy and often covered with dark brown scales. The cap grows up to 12 cm in diameter. The stipe is rusty orange like the cap, with a hint of a slimy, yellowish-white ring that soon disappears. The flesh is lemon yellow with a mild taste.

== Pharmacology ==
An extract of Suillus tridentinus exhibits inhibitory activity on thrombin.
