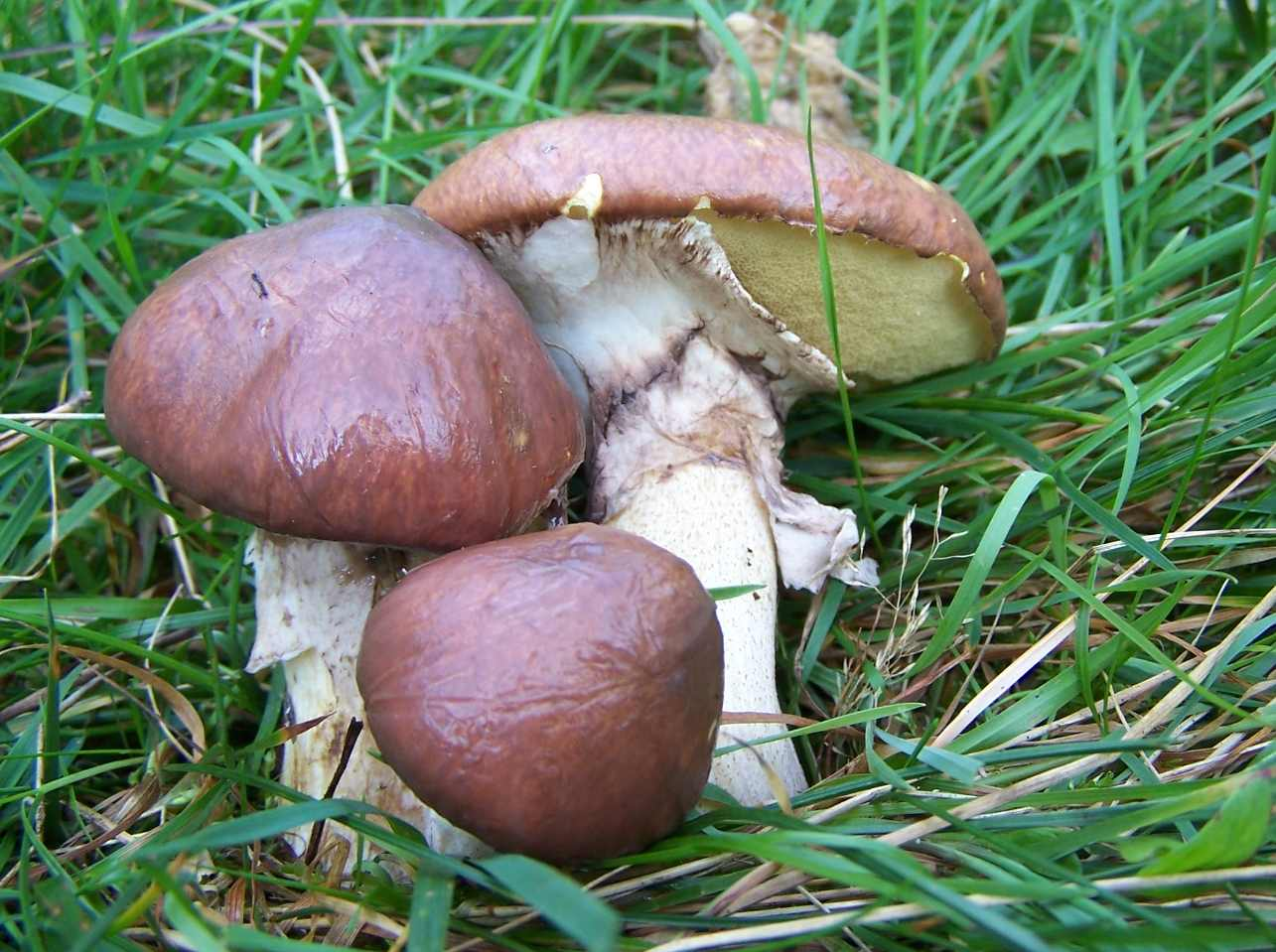
- Suillus luteus

Scientific classification
- Kingdom: Fungi
- Division: Basidiomycota
- Class: Agaricomycetes
- Order: Boletales
- Family: Suillaceae
- Genus: Suillus; Gray (1821)

Type species
- Suillus luteus (L.) Roussel (1821)

Synonyms
- List: Pinuzza Gray (1821); Boletus sect. Viscipellis Fr. (1838); Euryporus Quél. (1886); Cricunopus P.Karst. (1881); Rostkovites P.Karst. (1881); Viscipellis (Fr.) Quél. (1886); Viscipellis subgen. Peplopus Quél. (1886); Peplopus (Quél.) Quél. ex Moug. & Ferry (1887); Ixocomus Quél. (1888); Boletopsis Henn. (1898); Solenia Hill ex Kuntze (1898); Fuscoboletinus Pomerl. & A.H.Sm. (1962); Mariaella Šutara (1987); Gastrosuillus Thiers (1989)

= Suillus =

Genus of fungi

Suillus is a genus of basidiomycete fungi in the family Suillaceae and order Boletales. Species in the genus are associated with trees in the pine family (Pinaceae), and are mostly distributed in temperate locations in the Northern Hemisphere, although some species have been introduced to the Southern Hemisphere.

== Taxonomy ==
The genus Suillus was first defined by Pier Antonio Micheli in his 1729 work Nova plantarum genera, however it is not valid as it predates the 1753 start of Linnean taxonomy. Fries sanctioned the use by British botanist Samuel Frederick Gray in the first volume of his 1821 work A Natural Arrangement of British Plants. Setting Suillus luteus as the type species, he described the genus as those mushrooms with a centrally placed stipe, a distinct ring, a circular cap, and tubes that are stuck together.

They have been commonly called "slippery jacks" because the cap of the fruit body is sometimes slimy. The genus name is derived from the Latin sus, meaning "pig". Before 1997, the genus Suillus was considered part of the family Boletaceae.

The genus also contains what were known as the larch boletes, several species that were described in the genus Fuscoboletinus. These grow in association with larch or tamarack (Larix ssp.). Molecular analysis has shown them to not be a monophyletic group and to be mixed in with the Suillus species. (Note: these were: Fuscoboletinus aeruginascens - Grayish larch bolete (edible); Fuscoboletinus glandulosus; Fuscoboletinus grisellus; Fuscoboletinus ochraceoroseus - Rosy larch bolete; Fuscoboletinus paluster; Fuscoboletinus serotinus; Fuscoboletinus sinuspaulianus; Fuscoboletinus spectabilis - Bog bolete; Fuscoboletinus weaverae)

== Description ==
Structures of the fungi in this genus in common with other members of the order Boletales include the presence of a cylindrical stipe, cap, soft flesh and tubular hymenium. Specific characteristics common to most species in Suillus are the cap cuticle which is often slimy and sticky when moist, the presence of darkly staining, clustered, sterile cells called cystidia that give the tube mouths or the stipe surface a speckled or glandular appearance, spores that are usually cinnamon brown or chocolate brown in mass, and obligate mycorrhizal relationships primarily with members of the Pinaceae, especially with members of the genera Pinus, Larix and Pseudotsuga.

Intra-genus variation may be demonstrated by differences in colour and ornamentation of the cap cuticle, flesh, pores and stipe, the presence of a partial veil in immature forms and annuli thereafter, pore shape and distribution, as well as habitat. The cap cuticle is dark brown in S. brevipes, and yellow in S. grevillei. S. granulatus has a smooth cap cuticle, while that of S. lakei is finely scaly. The pores are bright yellow in S. collinitus, cinnamon in S. variegatus and grey in S. viscidus; in shape they are round in S. luteus and angular in S. bovinus. The flesh is white to yellow in S. luteus, while it is pallid in S. variegatus with a tendency to turn blue when exposed to air. Young S. luteus and S. grevillei bear partial veils whose remnants remain as annuli hanging from the stipe; in S. granulatus the stipe is bare. S. viscidus and S. grevillei occur under larch (Larix) only, while S. sibiricus is restricted to a few species of 5-needled pine (Pinus).

== Habitat and distribution ==
Species of Suillus are found all over the Northern Hemisphere where members of the tree family Pinaceae can be found. Although a few species are distributed in tropical regions (usually mountainous areas), most are limited to temperate areas. Some species have been introduced adventitiously with pine trees in pine plantations outside the natural area of Pinaceae.

Some Suillus species have entered regional red lists as endangered or vulnerable. Seven European countries have listed S. sibiricus. Individual countries have also listed other species, including S. flavidus, S. tridentinus, S. collinitus, S. plorans and S. lakei.

== Uses ==
Some Suillus species are edible and are highly esteemed, particularly in Slavic countries, where they are generally referred to as butter mushrooms (маслята). They are generally picked as buttons when the flesh is still firm. In some species, the slimy cap coat acts as a purgative when consumed and should be removed before cooking. Species of Suillus have been associated with the term "bolete", given to members of other genera bearing pores, most notably Boletus.

Some species can be used to make mushroom dyes, like S. americanus, S. cothurnatus, S. granulatus, and S. luteus.

== Species ==
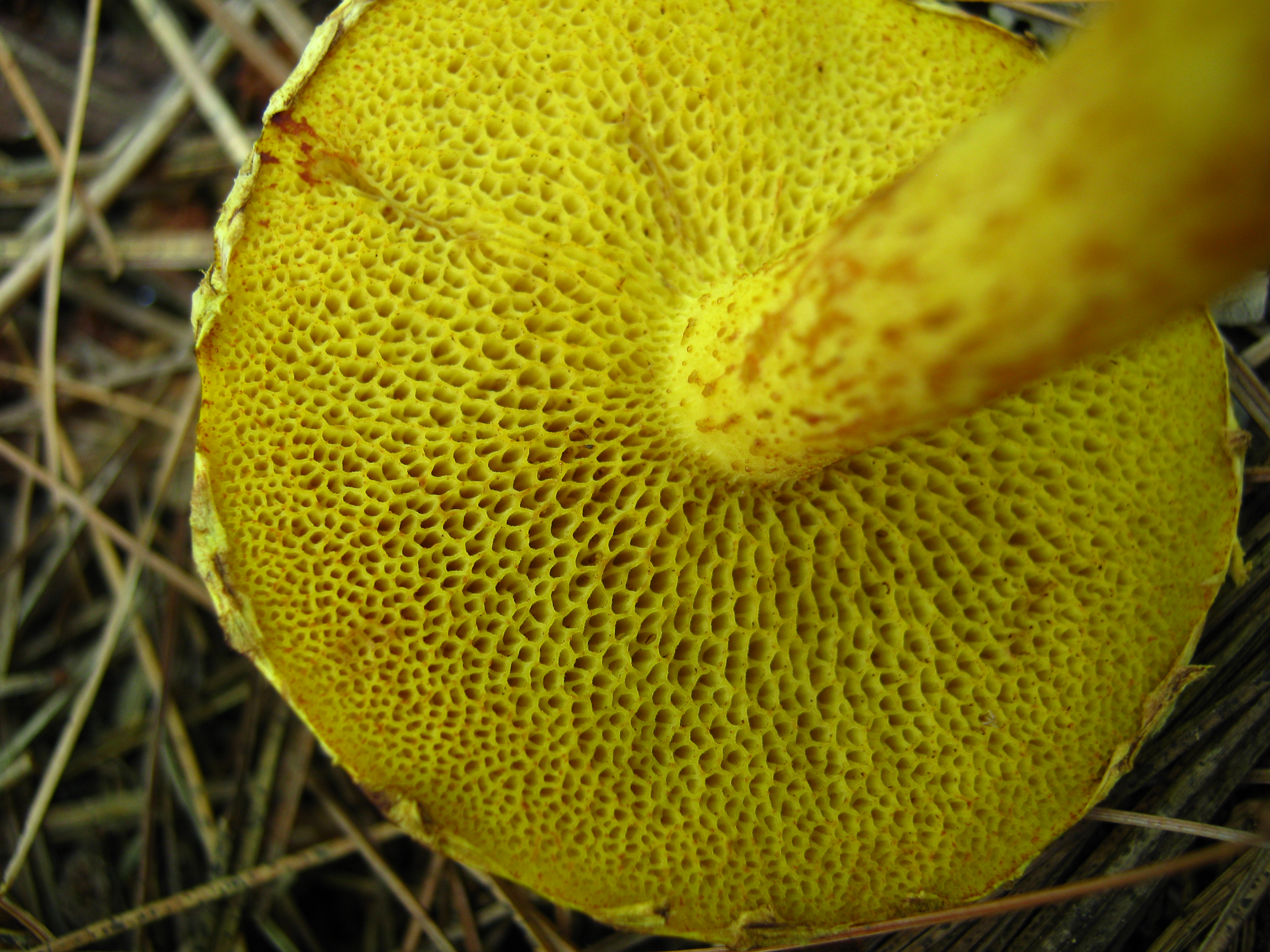
The cap underside of Suillus americanus (Peck 1887) Snell 1944 showing angular yellow pores

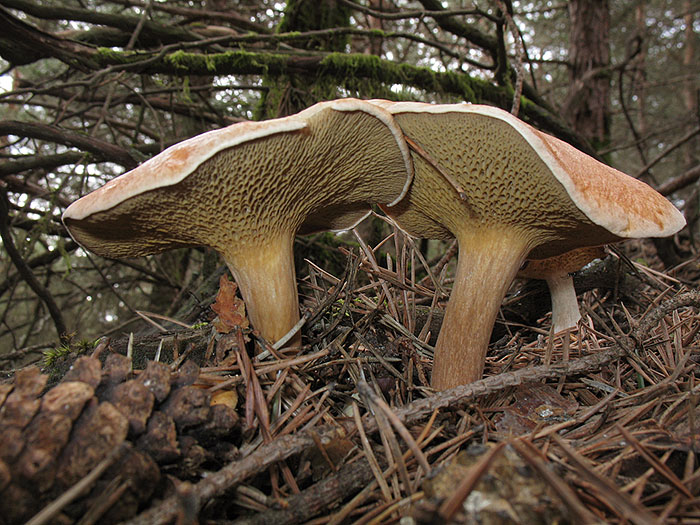
Suillus bovinus (L. 1753) Roussel 1796

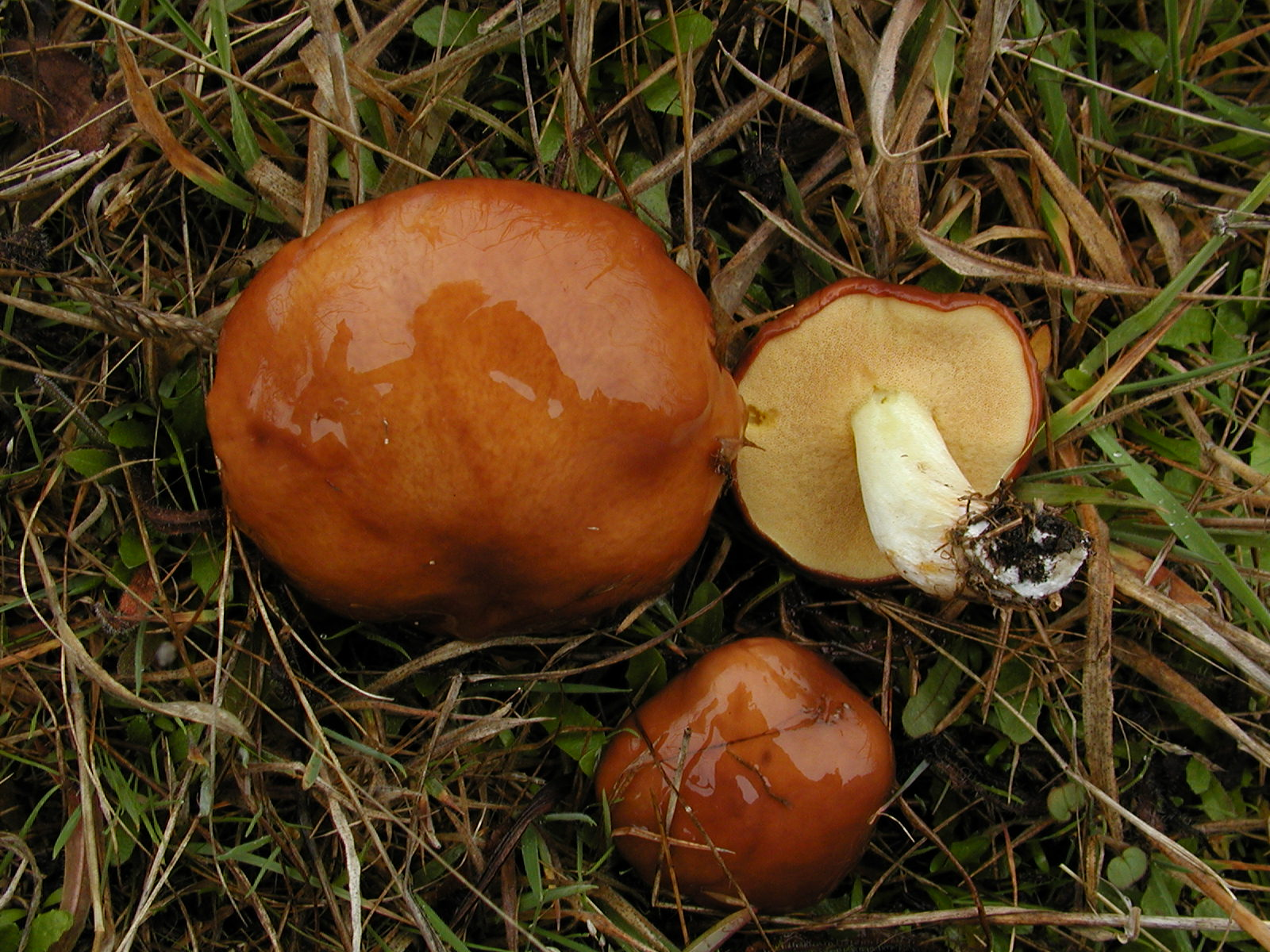
Suillus brevipes (Peck 1885) Kuntze 1898

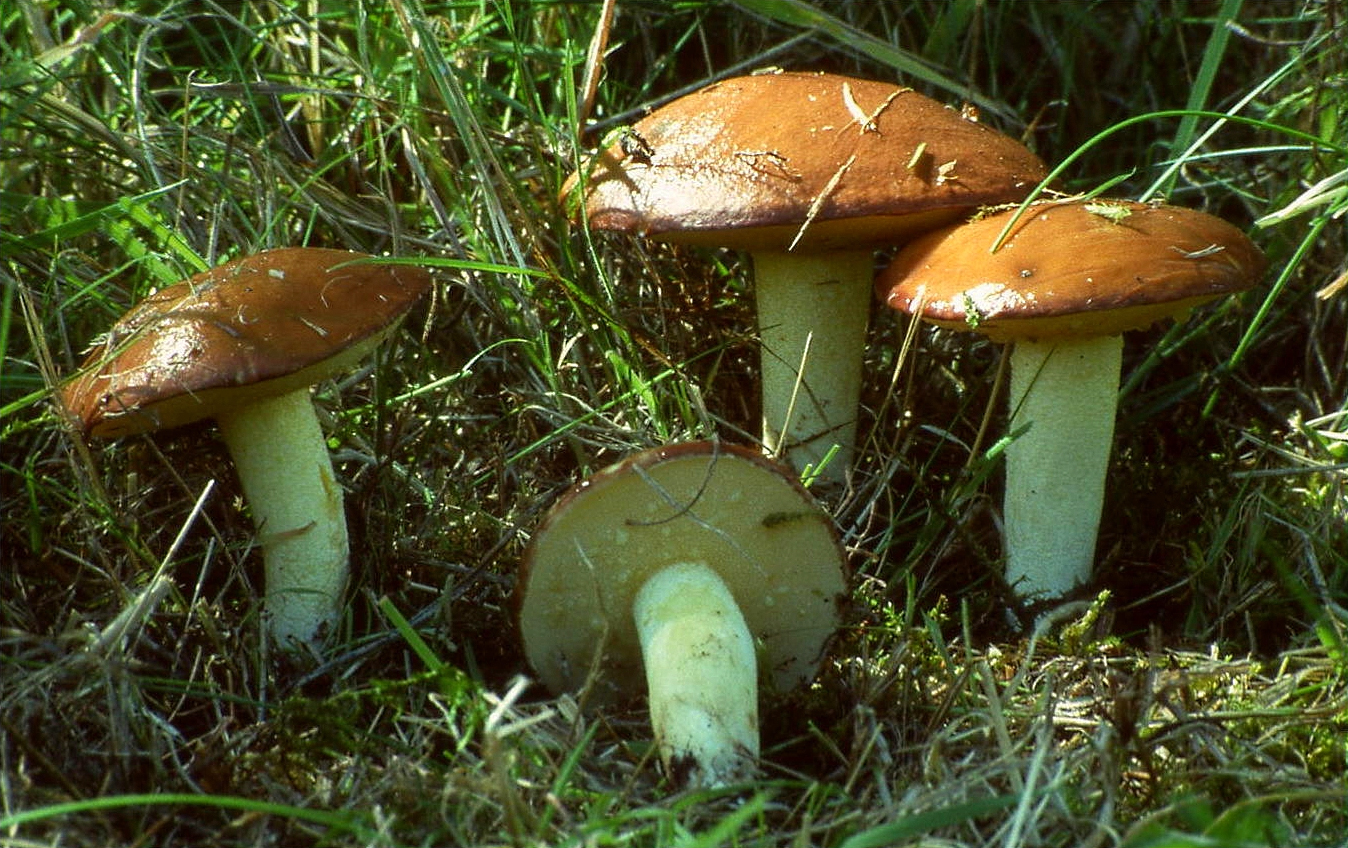
Suillus granulatus (L. 1753) Roussel 1796

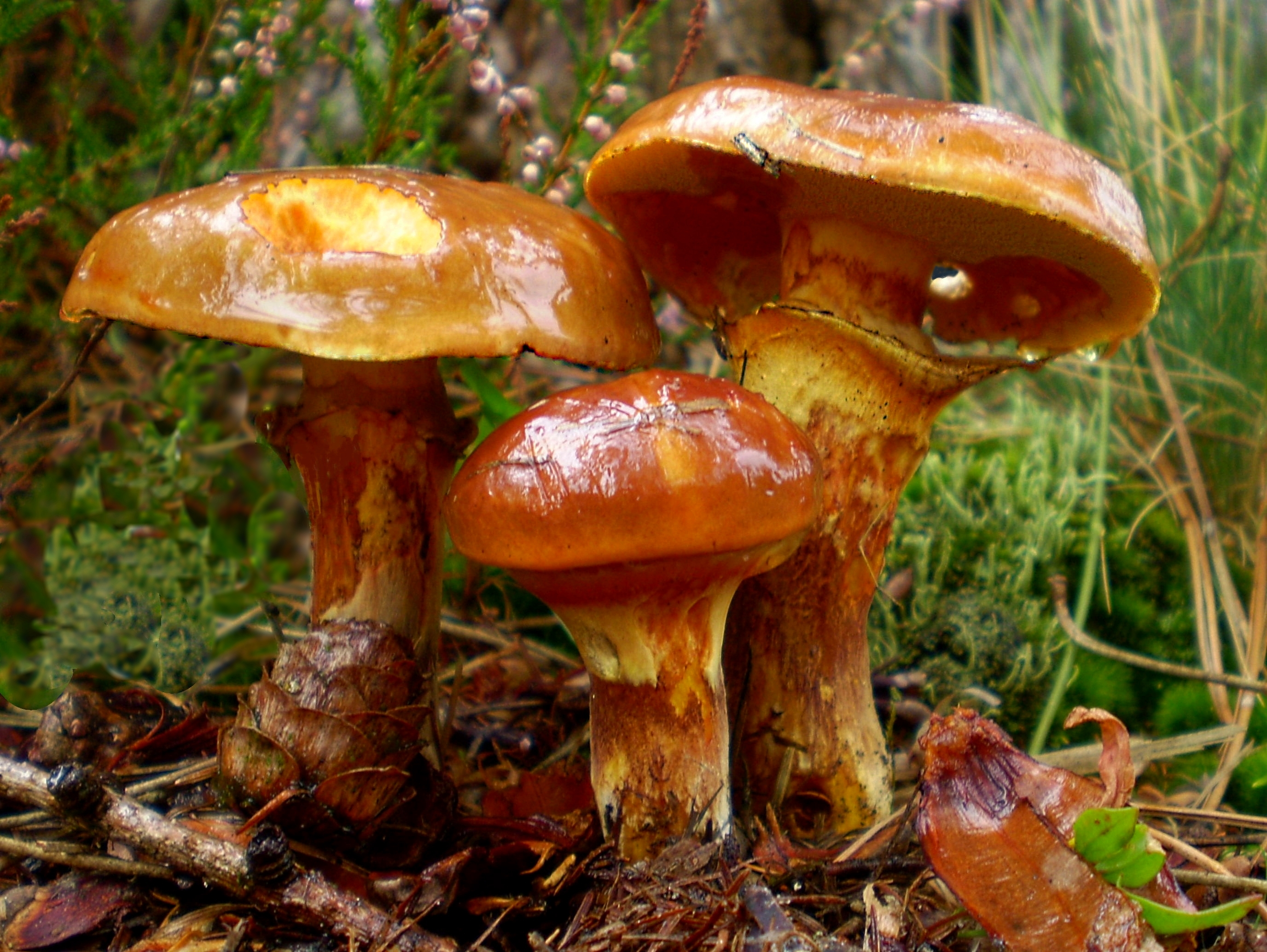
Suillus grevillei (Klotzsch 1832) Singer 1945

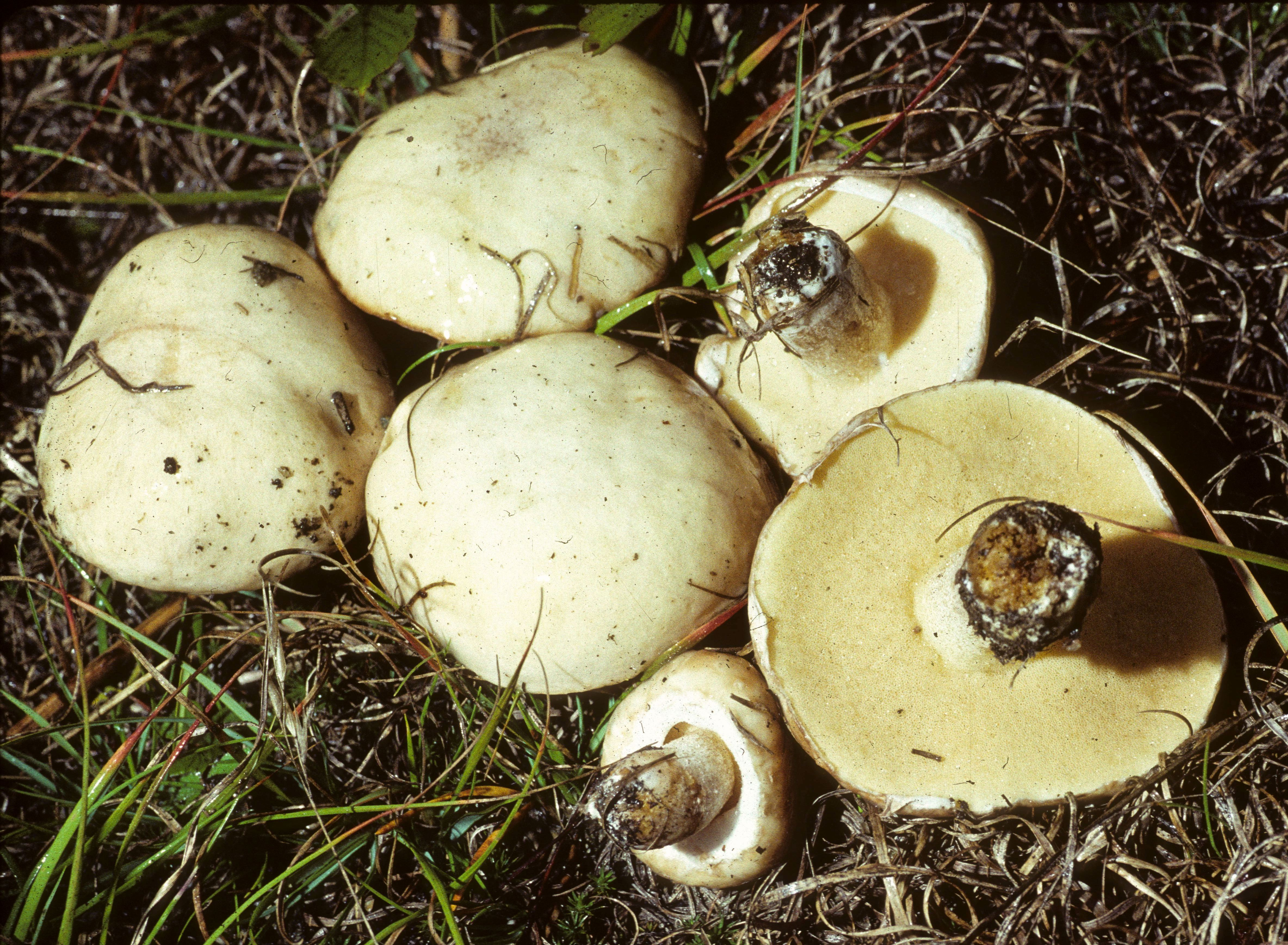
Suillus neoalbidipesM.E.Palm § E.L.Stewart 1984

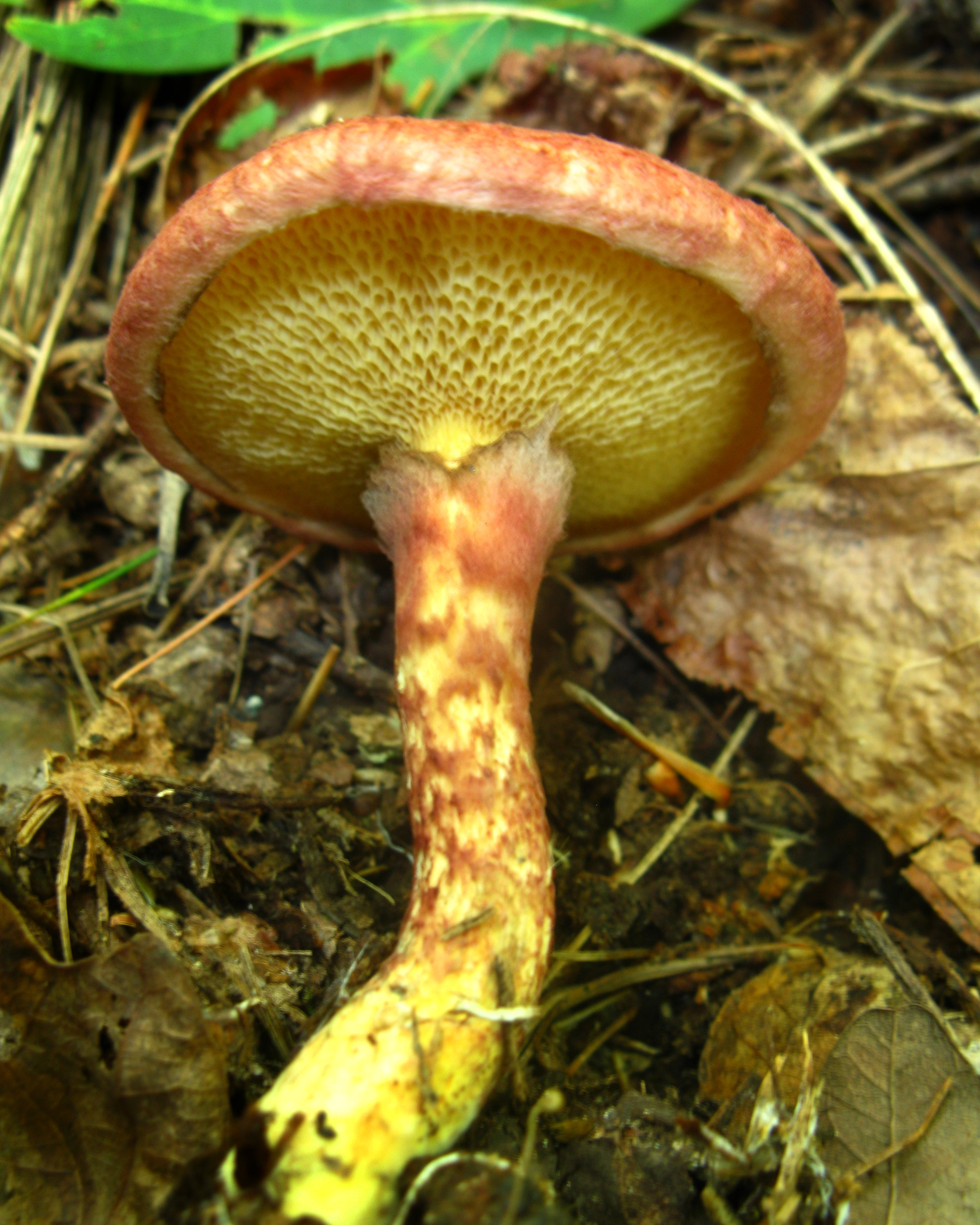
Suillus spraguei (Berk. § M.A.Curtis 1872) Kuntze 1898

A 2025 study aiming to characterize the subgenera, sections, and new species of Suillus, based on molecular data combined with morphology and ecology, recognized 12 new species, 5 new location records, and 14 potentially new species revealed in East Asia.

As of November 2025, Index Fungorum and Catalogue of Life list 126 valid species of Suillus, some of which are listed below:

- S. abietinus
- S. acerbus
- S. acidus
- S. aenoplacidus (2025)
- S. aestivoluteus (2025)
- S. albidipes
- S. albivelatus (edible)
- S. alboflocculosus
- S. alkaliaurantians
- S. amabilis
- S. americanus – chicken-fat suillus
- S. anomalus
- S. bellinii
- S. boletoluteus (2025)
- S. borealis
- S. boudieri
- S. bovinoides
- S. bovinus – Jersey cow mushroom
- S. bresadolae
- S. brevipes – short-stalked suillus
- S. brunnescens
- S. caerulescens
- S. californicus
- S. cavipes
- S. cavipoides – China
- S. cembrae
- S. chiapasensis
- S. cinerescens (2025)
- S. collarius
- S. collinitus
- S. cothurnatus
- S. decipiens
- S. flavidus (also known as S. umbonatus)
- S. flavogranulatus
- S. flavoluteus
- S. flavopunctipes (2025)
- S. flavus
- S. furfuraceus
- S. fuscotomentosus
- S. glandulosipes
- S. gloeous – China
- S. granulatus – dotted-stalk suillus
- S. grevillei – larch suillus, larch bolete
- S. grisellus
- S. guzmanii
- S. helenae
- S. hirtellus
- S. hololeucus
- Suillus holomaculatus – Mauritius
- S. intermedius
- S. jacuticus
- S. kaibabensis
- S. kunmingensis – China
- S. lakei – western painted suillus
- S. lapponicus – Finland
- S. lithocarpi-sequoiae
- S. longiflavopunctipes (2025)
- S. lutescens
- S. luteus – slippery Jack (many Suillus species are called by this common name)
- S. marginielevatus – Pakistan
- S. mediterraneensis
- S. megaporinus
- S. minusculus (2025)
- S. monticola
- S. neoalbidipes
- S. obscurus – Greece
- S. occidentalis
- S. ochraceoroseus
- S. pallidiceps
- S. phylolaricinus (2025)
- S. phylosubaureus (2025)
- S. pinorigidus
- S. placidus – white suillus
- S. plorans
- S. ponderosus
- S. pseudoalbivelatus – Dominican Republic
- S. pseudobrevipes
- S. punctipes
- S. pungens – pungent suillus
- S. quiescens – USA
- S. reticulatus
- S. riparius
- S. roseoporus
- S. roseovelatus – Greece
- S. ruber
- S. rubricontextus – China
- S. rubropunctatus
- S. salmonicolor
- S. serotinus
- S. sibiricus
- S. spraguei – painted suillus
- S. subacerbus – New Zealand
- S. subalpinus
- S. subaureus
- S. subcinnamomeus (2025)
- S. subluteus – slippery Jill
- S. subolivaceus
- S. subreticulatus – China
- S. subsibiricus (2025)
- S. subvariegatus
- S. tomentosus – tomentose suillus
- S. triacicularis – India
- S. tridentinus
- S. variegatus – velvet bolete
- S. viscidus – sticky bolete
- S. volcanalis
- S. wasatchicus
- S. weaverae
- S. zangii (2025)

== See also ==
- Mushroom hunting
- Mushroom poisoning
