= Veil (mycology) =

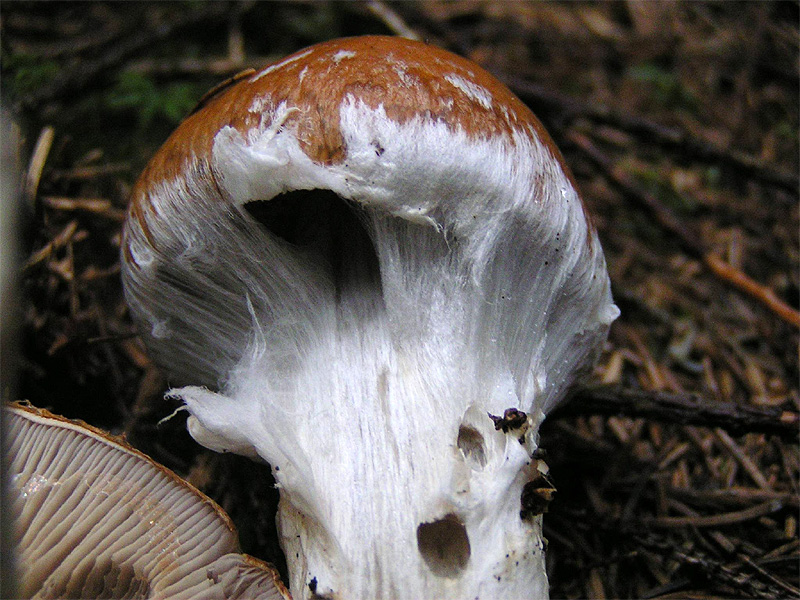
Clearly visible webby partial veil (cortina), hiding the stalk.

A veil or velum, in mycology, is one of several structures in fungi, especially the thin membrane that covers the cap and stalk of an immature mushroom.

Veils fall into two categories:

- Partial veil
- Universal veil
