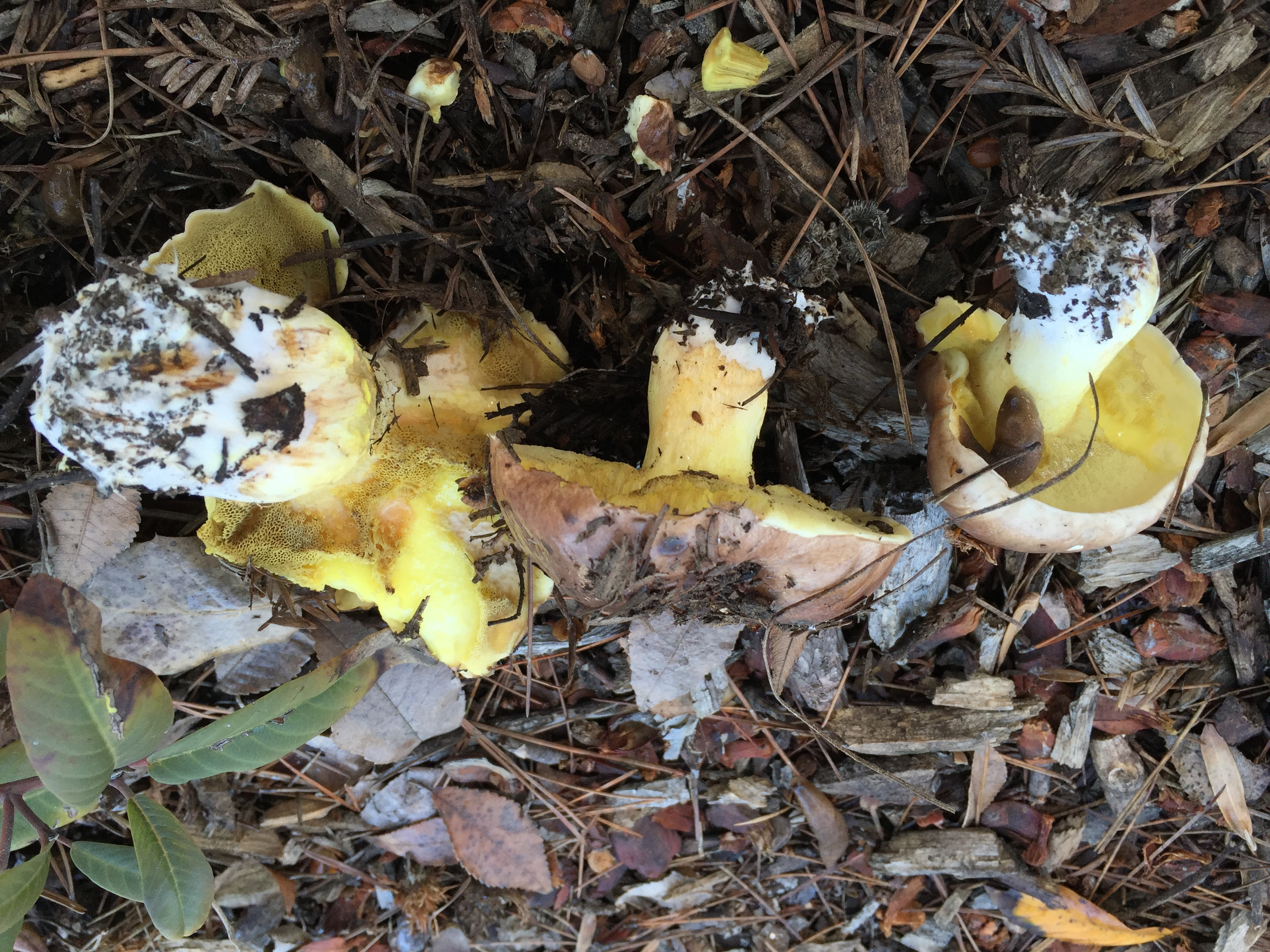

Conservation status
- Least Concern (IUCN 3.1)

Scientific classification
- Kingdom: Fungi
- Division: Basidiomycota
- Class: Agaricomycetes
- Order: Boletales
- Family: Suillaceae
- Genus: Suillus
- Species: S. quiescens

Binomial name
- Suillus quiescens T.D.Bruns & Vellinga (2010)

= Suillus quiescens =

Species of fungus

Suillus quiescens
- Mycological characteristics
- Pores on hymenium
- Cap is convex
- Stipe is bare
- Spore print is brown
- Ecology is mycorrhizal
- Edibility is edible

Suillus quiescens is a pored mushroom in the genus Suillus (family Suillaceae) that forms ectomycorrhizae with pines. It was first collected in 2002 on Santa Cruz Island off the coast of California in association with bishop pine (Pinus muricata), and was formally described in 2010. The species has been recorded from coastal and montane sites in California and Oregon, and has also been introduced to New Zealand in association with non-native Monterey pine (Pinus radiata). It may be under-reported because it can persist in soil as a dormant spore bank, and because it can be mistaken for the look-alike Suillus brevipes. Although similar in general appearance, it can be distinguished by its paler immature cap and by the tiny glandular dots on the stipe that darken with age. The species is assessed as least concern on the IUCN Red List.

== Discovery ==
Fruit bodies of the fungus were first collected in 2002 on Santa Cruz Island, in Santa Barbara County. They were named provisionally as a new species, Suillus quiescens, in conference proceedings published in 2005. The species was officially described and named in a 2010 Mycologia publication. The specific epithet quiescens refers to the organism's ability to wait dormant (quiescent) in the soil until it encounters pine roots.

== Phylogeny ==
- S. bellinii
- - - - S. pungens
      - - - S. glandulosipes, S. neoalbidipes
          - S. granulatus
        - - - - S. occidentalis
              - S. pseudobrevipes, S. volcanalis
            - S. luteus
          - S. brevipes, S. weaverae
    - - S. granulatus, S. collinitus
      - S. collinitus
  - S. quiescens

Phylogeny and relationships of S. quiescens and other Suillus species based on ITS sequences.

Based on phylogenetic analysis of the internal transcribed spacer (ITS) region of ribosomal DNA of a number of Suillus species, S. quiescens is distinct from other morphologically similar species such as S. brevipes, S. volcanalis, and S. occidentalis. The S. quiescens sequences, which were obtained from fruit bodies and from mycorrhizal root tips, formed a clade. The analysis showed that the S. quiescens sequences were matches to some unidentified Suillus sequences found from mycorrhizae of pine seedlings collected from Oregon and California.

A later multigene revision of Suillus (using ITS, LSU, TEFα-1, RPB1 and RPB2 sequences) placed S. quiescens in Suillus subgenus Suillus, section Suillus. In that framework, sect. Suillus comprises Pinus-associated species that typically have a glabrous, viscid to glutinous cap and glandular dots on the stipe, and the section is supported by phylogenetic analyses.

== Description ==
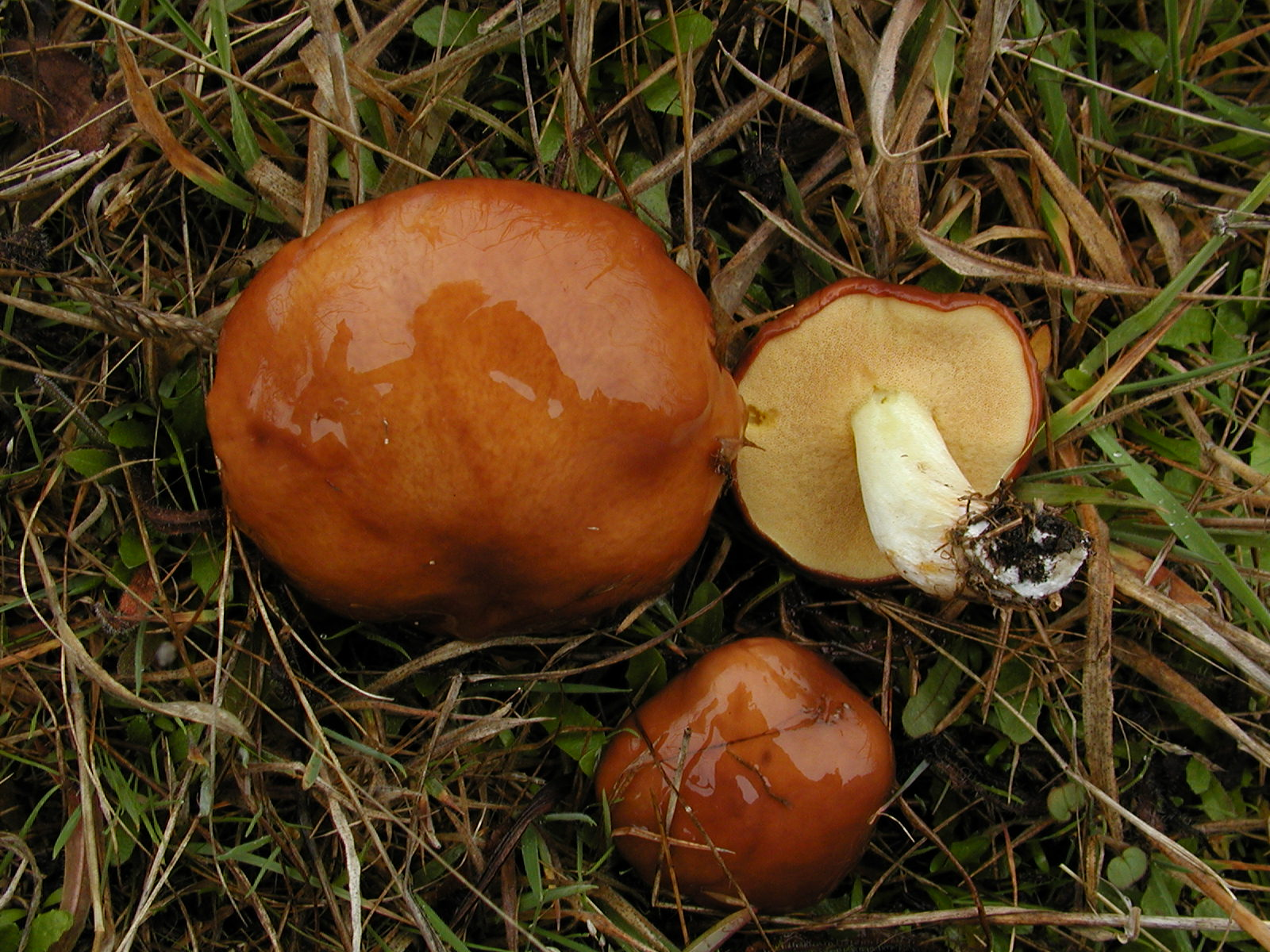
Suillus quiescens resembles S. brevipes, shown here.

The cap ranges in shape from hemispheric to broadly convex, and has a diameter of 6 to 12 cm (2.4 to 4.7 in). The cap color is deep brown in mature specimens and lighter shades of brown in younger mushrooms. Young specimens have a sticky layer of gluten on the cap that dries out in maturity. The edge of the cap is rolled inwards in young specimens. The flesh of the cap is whitish and does not change color when bruised or cut. The tubes on the underside of the cap are light yellow to bright orange-yellow; the tube mouths are usually less than 1 mm wide. The stipe is usually between 2 and 4 cm (0.8 and 1.6 in) long, less frequently reaching up to 8 cm (3.1 in). It is either the same width throughout or slightly larger (bulbous) at the base. The color of the upper portion of the stipe is pale to light yellow, while the lower portion may be light brown or covered with streaks of glutinous material like that on the cap. The stipe surface is covered with fine glands that are initially slightly darker than the color of the stipe surface, but deepen to brown or nearly black after drying. The color of the spore print was not determined from the initial collections, but is thought to be yellow-brown to brown based on the accumulated spore deposit seen on the surface of the caps of neighboring fruit bodies.

The elongate spores are oblong in face view, with dimensions of 6.1–14.7 by 2.4–3.7 μm. Most spores have a single large drop of oil in them. The spore-bearing cells, the basidia, are club-shaped, two- or four-spored, and measure 20.2–26.2 by 5.2–6.7 μm.

=== Similar species ===
With its short stipe and sticky cap, S. quiescens is similar to S. brevipes. It may be distinguished from the latter species by the color of the young (light-brown) cap, the glandular dots at the top of stipes in mature specimens, and the yellowish color at the top of the stipe.

== Habitat and distribution ==
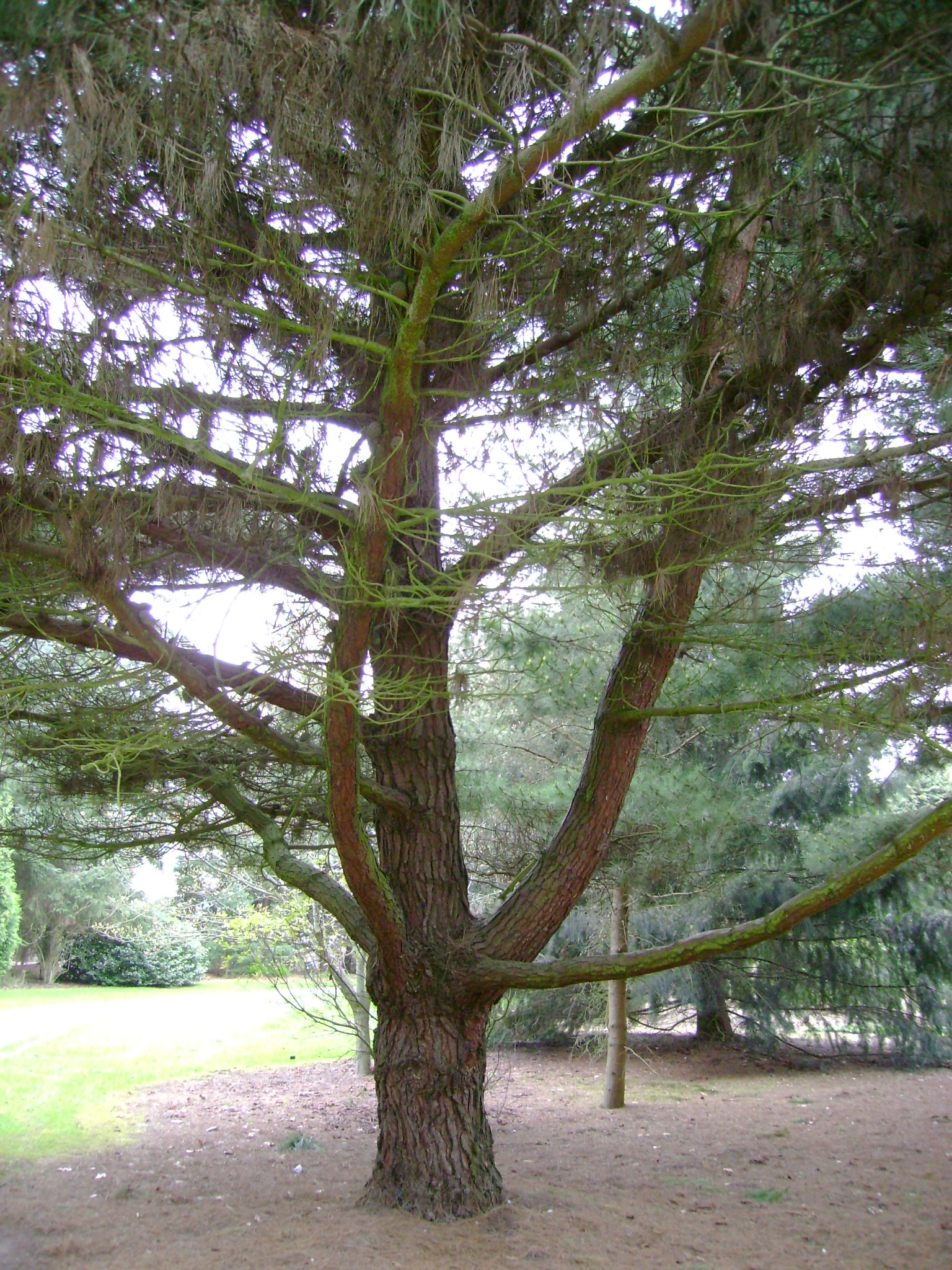
S. quiescens forms mycorrhizal associations with bishop pine.

Fruit bodies grow together in small groups on the ground in association with bishop pine (Pinus muricata). In a multigene phylogenetic study of Suillus, S. quiescens was also sampled in California in association with Monterey pine (Pinus radiata), in addition to bishop pine. The IUCN Red List assessment reports that it is ectomycorrhizal with two- and three-needle pines and also occurs with lodgepole pine (Pinus contorta) on the northern California and Oregon coast; based on environmental samples, the assessment considers it likely to occur with Ponderosa pine (P. ponderosa) and Jeffrey pine (P. jeffreyi) as well, while noting that more data are needed on the species' ecology. S. quiescens is the most common Suillus species on Santa Cruz Island, its type locality, and it has also been collected at Santa Rosa Island and Point Reyes National Seashore in California. Santa Cruz and Santa Rosa, two of the four islands that make up the northern Channel Islands, have a Mediterranean climate with cool, wet winters and warm, dry summers.

Most species of Suillus do not have spores that survive in the soil for extended periods of time, but the spores of S. quiescens can tolerate the dry conditions and heat typical of California. Another study showed that viable S. quiescens spores were present in steam-pasteurized soil planted in Oregon fields. The original description suggested that S. quiescens is an early successional species whose spores remain dormant in the soil until the roots of a suitable pine host are encountered. A 2024 review of Suillus introductions described long-lived soil spore banks as a feature of introduced Suillus, allowing spores to persist through drought and fire until compatible Pinaceae roots are available.

The IUCN Red List assessment describes the species as occurring in disjunct subpopulations in California and Oregon, and reports that it is probably under-recorded because it is often misidentified as S. brevipes. It has also been introduced to New Zealand, where it grows with the non-native Monterey pine. A bolete illustrated by the New Zealand botanist John Buchanan in a nineteenth-century manuscript notebook has been suggested as a possible depiction of S. quiescens in New Zealand; the identification was presented as provisional, and it would represent an early New Zealand record only if the original specimen had been collected under pines.

== Conservation ==
The IUCN assesses Suillus quiescens as a least-concern species. The population trend is listed as unknown, and the assessment reports fruiting body records from about 15 localities plus a small number of records from root tip sequences and environmental samples. Threats mentioned include development and altered fire regimes affecting coastal stands of Pinus muricata and native P. radiata, and drought-related dieback of P. ponderosa in the Sierra Nevada foothills; the assessment indicates these threats are unlikely to have drastically affected the overall population. Suggested actions include protecting and managing coastal pine forests and improving monitoring of population trends and ecology.
