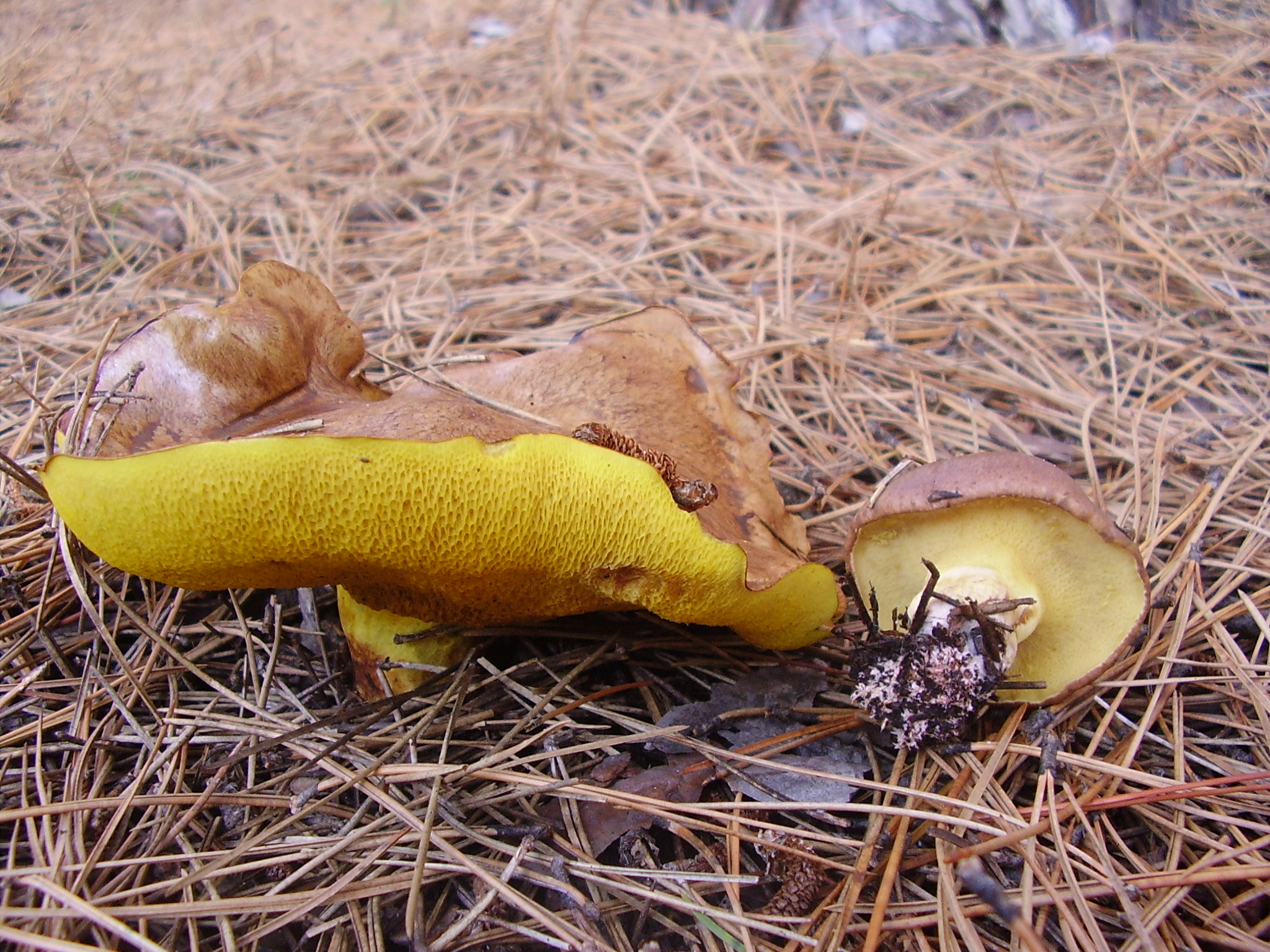

Scientific classification
- Kingdom: Fungi
- Division: Basidiomycota
- Class: Agaricomycetes
- Order: Boletales
- Family: Suillaceae
- Genus: Suillus
- Species: S. collinitus

Binomial name
- Suillus collinitus (Fr.) Kuntze (1898)

Varieties
- S. collinitus var. aureus Huijsman; S. collinitus var. velatipes Contu, Lavorato & Simonini (1998)

Synonyms
- Boletus collinitus Fr. (1838); Suillus fluryi Huijsman (1969)

= Suillus collinitus =

Species of fungus

Suillus collinitus
- Mycological characteristics
- Pores on hymenium
- Cap is convex or flat
- Hymenium is decurrent
- Stipe is bare
- Spore print is brown
- Ecology is mycorrhizal
- Edibility is edible

Suillus collinitus is a pored mushroom of the genus Suillus in the family Suillaceae. It is an edible mushroom found in European pine forests. The mushroom has a reddish to chestnut-brown cap that reaches up to 11 cm (4.3 in) in diameter, and a yellow stem measuring up to 7 cm (2.8 in) tall by 1 to 2 cm (0.4 to 0.8 in) thick. On the underside of the cap are small angular pores, initially bright yellow before turning greenish-brown with age. A characteristic feature that helps to distinguish it from similar Suillus species, such as S. granulatus, is the pinkish mycelia at the base of the stem.

Molecular analysis has shown the species to be related to other typical Mediterranean Suillus species such as S. bellinii, S. luteus, and S. mediterraneensis. S. collinitus is a mycorrhizal species, and forms associations with several species of pine, most notably the Aleppo pine. This tree species is commonly used in reforestation schemes and soil conservation against erosion in the Mediterranean region, and S. collinitus is often used as a beneficial inoculant to help the young trees better survive in typically harsh soil conditions.

== Taxonomy, phylogeny, and naming ==
- - - - - - - - - S. weaverae
                - S. brevipes
              - - S. luteus
                - S. pseudobrevipes
            - - S. glandulosipes
              - S. neoalbidipes
          - S. granulatus
        - S. pungens
      - - S. collinitus
        - S. c. f. granulatus (Nepal)

Phylogeny and relationships of S. collinitus and related species based on ITS sequences.

The species was first described as Boletus collinitus by Elias Magnus Fries in 1838. Otto Kuntze transferred it to the genus Suillus in his 1898 Revisio Generum Plantarum. In 1969 Dutch mycologist H.S.C. Huijsman described the variety S. collinitus var. aureus (as S. fluryi var. aureus; S. fluryi is a synonym of S. collinitus) based on a collection from Switzerland. The variety velatipes was described in 1998 by Giampaolo Simonini and colleagues from Italian collections.

A 1996 molecular analysis of 38 different Suillus species used the sequences of their internal transcribed spacers to infer phylogenetic relationships and clarify the taxonomy of the genus. The results indicated that S. collinitus is most closely related to a specimen of S. granuatus collected from Nepal. According to the authors, this Nepalese isolate probably represents a species distinct from North American and European isolates, based on morphology and host tree association. In 2006, a phylogenetic analysis of Suillus isolates collected from Spain showed that S. collinitus was closely related to other species "typical of the Mediterranean area", namely S. bellinii, S. luteus, and S. mediterraneensis.

The specific epithet collinitus is derived from Latin, and means "smeared" or "greased". The British botanist Mordecai Cubitt Cooke called the mushroom the "ringless yellow boletus" in an 1873 publication.

== Description ==
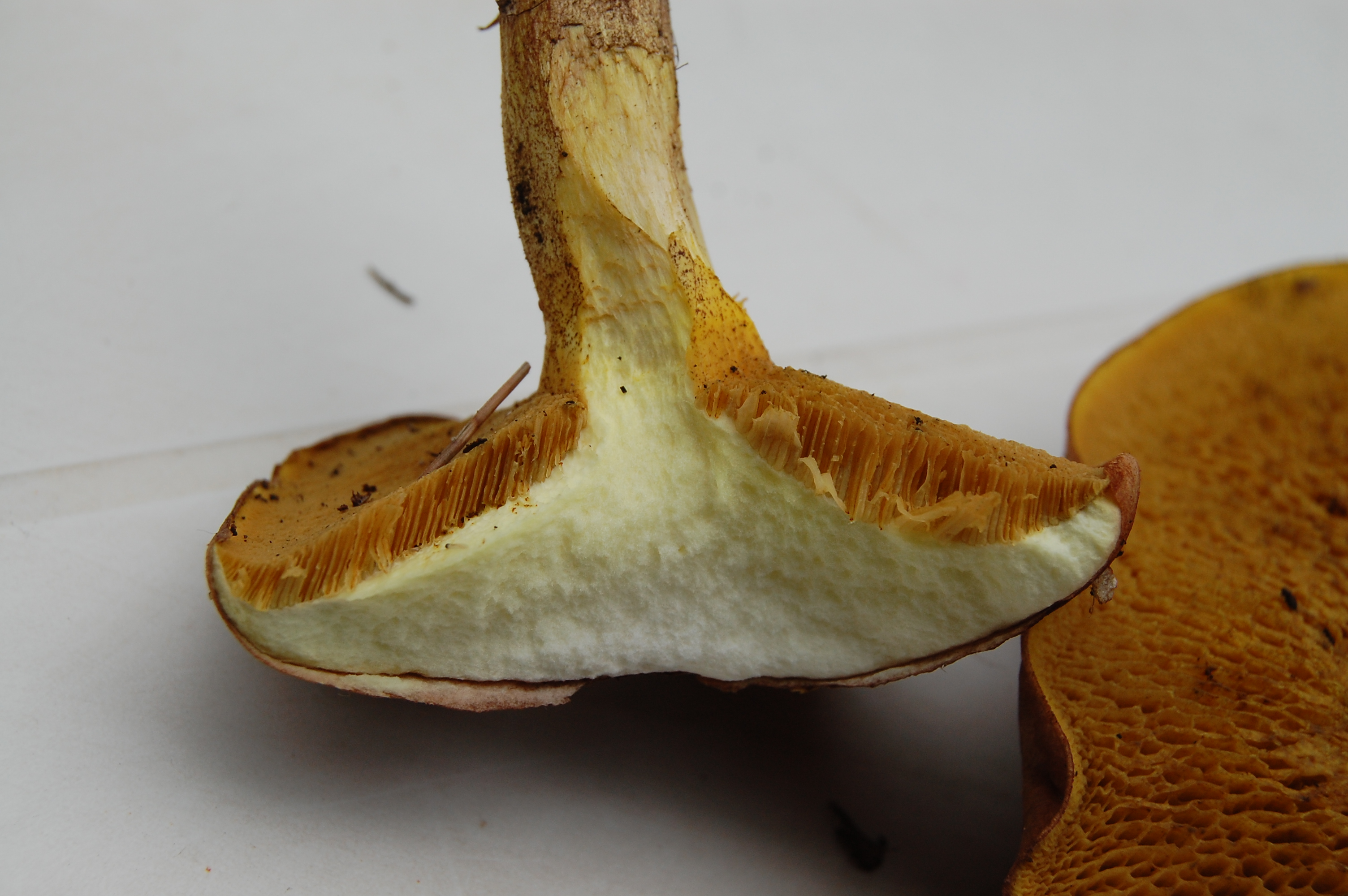
View of flesh and pore structure

The fruit body of Suillus collinitus is a medium to large, fleshy bolete. The cap is initially rounded, becoming convex and finally flat, reaching up to 11 cm (4.3 in) in diameter. The cap is covered with a brown cuticle of variable shade that is decorated with minuscule radial striations, which become more obvious in fully expanded specimens and especially in dry weather. The cap is often shaped irregularly and becomes viscid (sticky) when damp. The tubes are short and their stem attachment is usually slightly decurrent to adnate. The small and angular pores are yellow but darken with age. Young, fresh specimens sometimes bear droplets of a clear fluid that collect on the pore surface.

The cylindrical stem is often short and stubby, typically 4–7 cm (1.6–2.8 in) tall by 1–2 cm (0.4–0.8 in) thick, coloured yellowish and ornamented with sparse reddish-brown granules. There is no ring. The base of the stem bears pink overtones and is attached to distinctively pink mycelial threads, which are visible when the fruit body is uprooted. The flesh is yellowish, thick and soft. In a colour reaction test with ammonia solution, the flesh turns reddish.

The spores are seen ochre-brown in mass, but pale yellow when viewed with a light microscope. They are fusiform (tapered at each end), sized 8–10.5 by 3–4.5 μm. The basidia (spore-bearing cells of the hymenium) are four-spored.

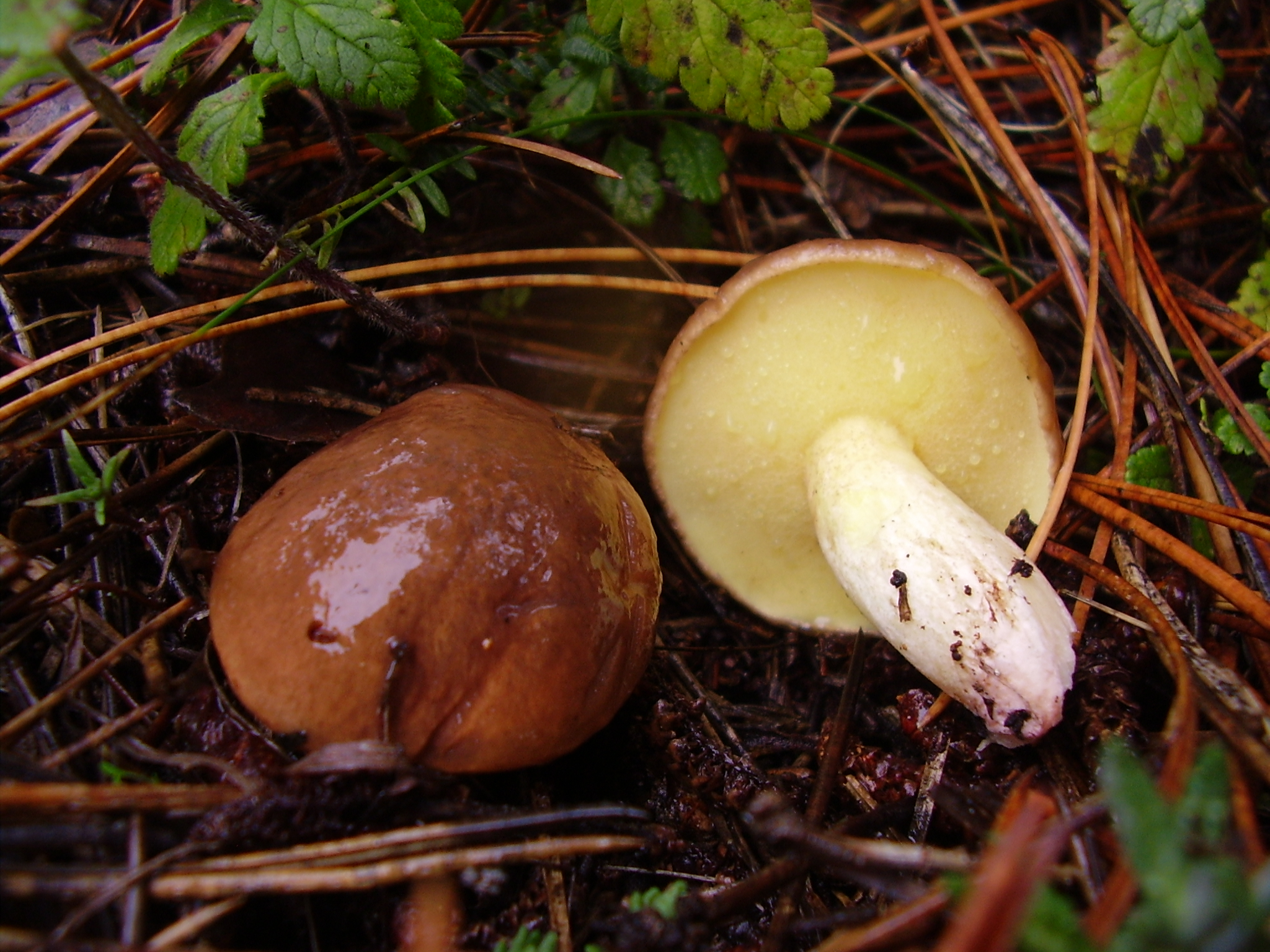
Suillus collinitus (above) has a pink mycelium, contrasting with the white mycelium of the similar S. granulatus (below)

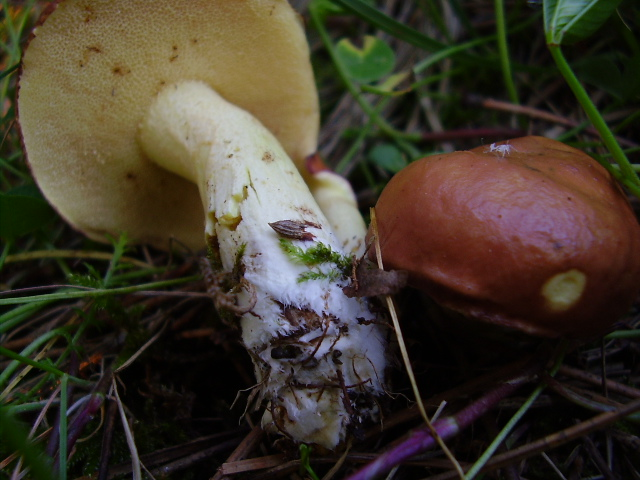

Especially characteristic for S. collinitus are the cap striations and pink mycelium. The fungus in many aspects resembles S. granulatus – a common species in European pine forests. S. granulatus, however, has a homogeneous brown cap without striations, and its mycelium is characteristically white.

=== Varieties ===
Two varieties of S. collinitus have been described. S. collinitus var. aureus has a golden-yellow cap. S. collinitus var. velatipes, originally found in Italy growing in poor acidic soil in association with Aleppo pine (Pinus halepensis), is distinguished by a glutinous brown veil at the base of the stem, and a slender white felting at the cap margin.

=== Similar species ===
Suillus collinitus is often found in the same habitat with other thermophilic species, including S. mediterraneensis and S. bellinii, especially in the Mediterranean basin. Some common species which occur throughout much of Europe and also associate with two-needled pines include S. luteus and S. granulatus.

=== Edibility ===
Various authors regard Suillus collinitus as edible with a sour odor and nondescript taste. It is advisable, as for all species of Suillus, to pick only young specimens and to peel the cuticle before preparation. The mushroom contains several tocopherols, a class of chemical compounds collectively known as vitamin E, and which confer antioxidant activity. They also contain several organic acids, most predominantly the pairs malic and quinic acids, and citric and ketoglutaric acid, which respectively make up 42% and 30% of total organic acids. The composition and concentration of organic acids in mushrooms are major factors in influencing their flavour; some organic acids contribute to antioxidant activity.

== Distribution, habitat, and ecology ==
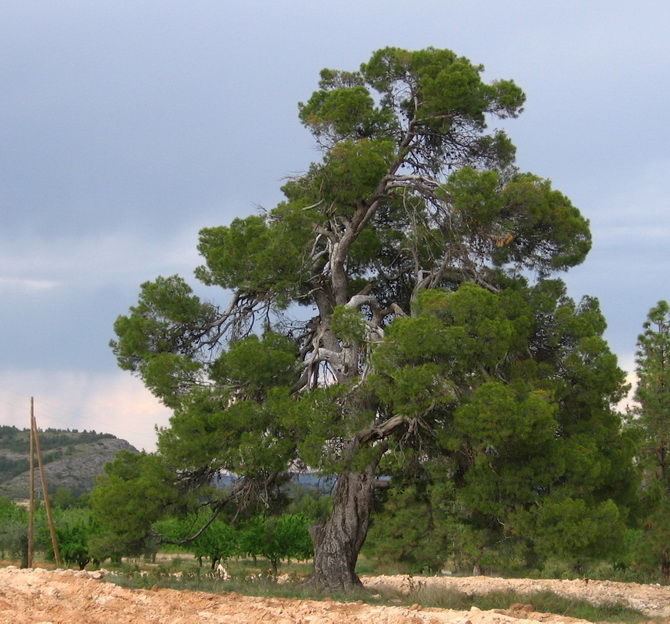
The Aleppo pine (Pinus halepensis) is one of several species with which S. collinitus forms mycorrhizae.

Suillus collinitus is found throughout Europe. It is an ectomycorrhizal fungus, forming mutually beneficial symbiotic relationships with several species of pine (Pinus). These include several two-needled European species of pine: Aleppo pine (P. halepensis) European black pine (P. nigra), stone pine (P. pinea), and Scots pine (P. sylvestris). The fungus favours limestone soils. S. collinitus is thermophilic, commonly occurring in southern Europe. It is rarely seen in more northern regions, such as the British Isles and Poland. It is red-listed in Denmark as near-threatened, and in Estonia as endangered. It has also been collected in Iran.

The mushroom was reported in the municipality of Paipa, in the department of Boyaca, in Colombia. It was reported by mycologyst Juan Camilo Rodríguez Martínez.

Suillus collinitus is the most frequent fungus associating with Aleppo pine – a hardy tree utilised for reforestation schemes and soil conservation against erosion in the Mediterranean region. A study performed in the south of France discovered that S. collinitus and S. mediterraneensis are multi-stage ectomycorrhizal fungi, associating with both young and mature stands of Aleppo pine. These two species may play a key role in the survival and adaptation of this species of pine on disturbed calcareous sites. Roots mycorrhizal with S. collinitus were found capable of surviving successive disturbances by fire or ploughing. Moreover, the fungus retained its viability to propagate via its mycelial network which helped the recolonisation effort of newly introduced trees. The fungus has also been shown to improve the growth of Mediterranean pines grown in greenhouses and nurseries. Unlike other Suillus species that grow in wet climates, such as S. grevillei and S. spraguei, S. collinitus does not typically produce fruit bodies in young plantations. This fruiting behaviour may be attributed to the typically nutrient-poor xeric Mediterranean environment in combination with a lack of tree canopy. The absence of above-ground indicators of fungal presence makes analysis of underground populations difficult; molecular markers have been developed to assist in monitoring fungal growth and ectomycorrhizal formation and persistence in young plantations.

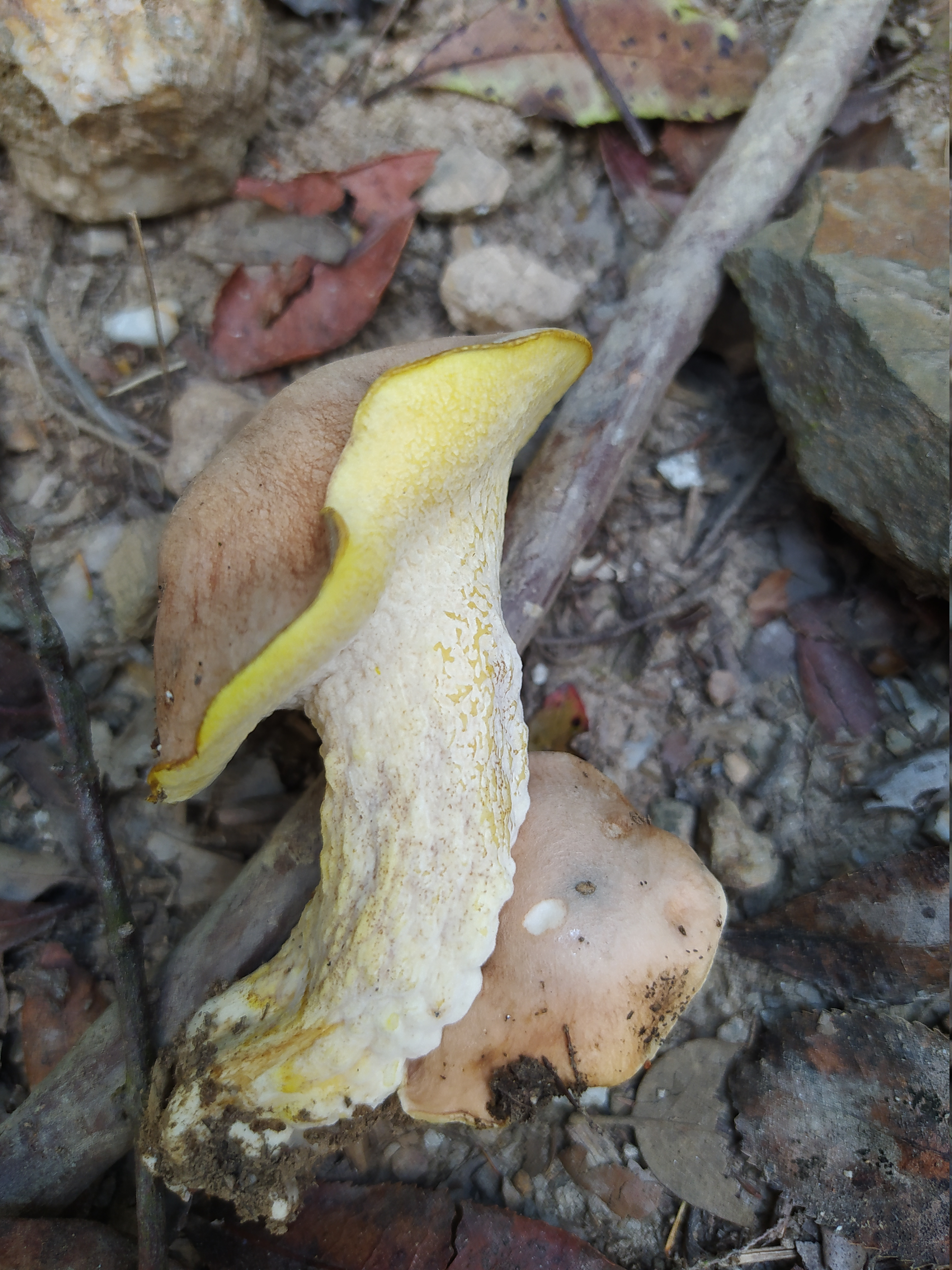
Suillus collinitus parasitized by Hypomyces chrysospermus

The ectomycorrizhae formed between several Suillus species and Aleppo pine has been studied under in vitro conditions in the laboratory. Tree shoots inoculated with either S. collinitus, S. bellinii, and S. mediterraneensis tended to grow better and showed superior mycorrhizal development than other tested Suillus species, suggesting that the three have a "physiological specificity" for the tree. A 2010 publication reported that the fungal hyphae are covered in crystals of oxalic acid, which, in addition to reducing soil pH, reduces grazing by the soil microarthropod Folsomia candida.
