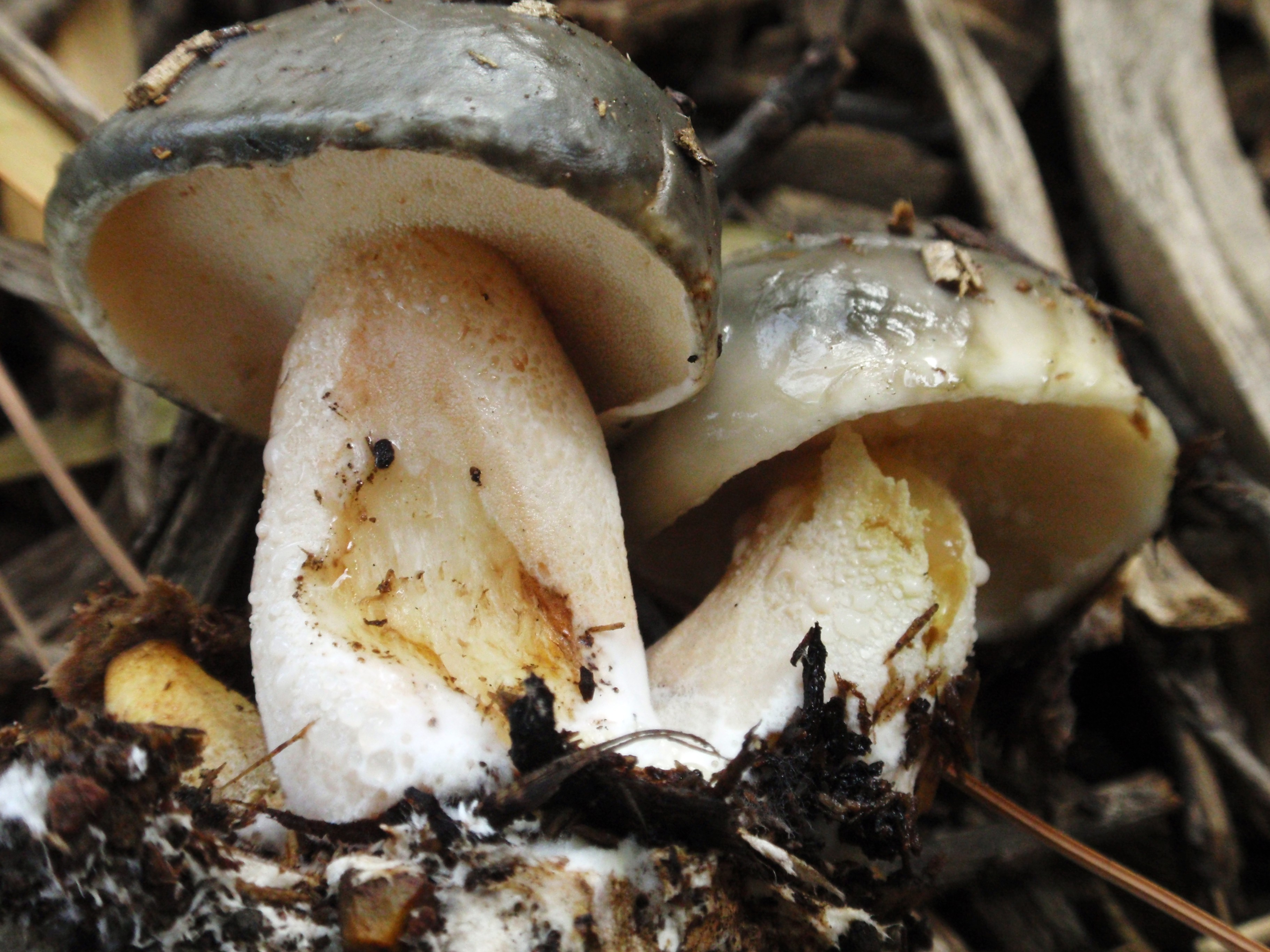

Conservation status
- Least Concern (IUCN 3.1)

Scientific classification
- Kingdom: Fungi
- Division: Basidiomycota
- Class: Agaricomycetes
- Order: Boletales
- Family: Suillaceae
- Genus: Suillus
- Species: S. pungens

Binomial name
- Suillus pungens Thiers & A.H.Sm. (1964)

= Suillus pungens =

Species of fungus

Suillus pungens
- Mycological characteristics
- Pores on hymenium
- Cap is convex
- Stipe is bare
- Spore print is brown
- Ecology is mycorrhizal
- Edibility is edible

Suillus pungens, commonly known as the pungent slippery jack or the pungent suillus, is a species of fungus in the genus Suillus. The fruit bodies of the fungus have slimy convex caps up to 14 cm (5 1/2 in) wide. The mushroom is characterized by the very distinct color changes that occur in the cap throughout development. Typically, the young cap is whitish, later becoming grayish-olive to reddish-brown or a mottled combination of these colors. The mushroom has a dotted stipe up to 7 cm (2 3/4 in) long and 2 cm (3/4 in) thick. On the underside on the cap is the spore-bearing tissue, consisting of minute vertically arranged tubes that open as a surface of angular, yellowish pores. The presence of milky droplets on the pore surface of young specimens, especially in humid environments, is a characteristic feature of this species. S. pungens can usually be distinguished from other similar Suillus species by differences in distribution, odor and taste.

An ectomycorrhizal species, S. pungens forms an intimate mutualistic relationship between its underground mycelium and the young roots of the associated host tree. In its native range, the fungus is associated mainly with Monterey pine and bishop pine in coastal California, but it also occurs with a wider range of planted and introduced pines in the state, including stone pine, maritime pine, and Aleppo pine, especially in urban areas. The species has also been reported as an introduction in New Zealand (commonly with introduced Monterey pine) and in Australia with introduced pines.

Several studies have investigated the role of S. pungens in the coastal Californian forest ecosystem it occupies. Although the species produces more fruit bodies than other competing ectomycorrhizal fungi in the same location, it is not a dominant root colonizer, and occupies only a small percentage of ectomycorrhizal root tips. The fungus's propensity to fruit prolifically despite minimal root colonization is a result of its ability to efficiently transfer nutrients from its host for its own use. The mushroom is considered edible, but is not highly regarded.

== Taxonomy ==
The fungus was first described scientifically by American mycologists Harry D. Thiers and Alexander H. Smith in their 1964 monograph on North American Suillus species. The type collection was made on the campus of San Francisco State University in San Francisco. Smith and Thiers classified S. pungens in section Suilli—a grouping of related species characterized by the presence of either a ring on the stipe, a partial veil adhering to the cap margin, or a "false veil" not attached to the stipe but initially covering the tube cavity.

A 1996 molecular analysis of 38 different Suillus species used the sequences of their internal transcribed spacers to infer phylogenetic relationships and clarify the taxonomy of the genus. The results suggest that S. pungens was genetically similar to S. collinitus, S. neoalbidipes, S. pseudobrevipes, S. luteus, S. brevipes, S. weaverae, and certain isolates of S. granulatus.

The specific epithet is derived from the Latin pungens, and refers to the pungent aroma of the fruit bodies. The mushroom is commonly known as the "pungent slippy jack" or the "pungent suillus". It has also been referred to as the "slippery jack", a common name applied to several Suillus species.

== Description ==
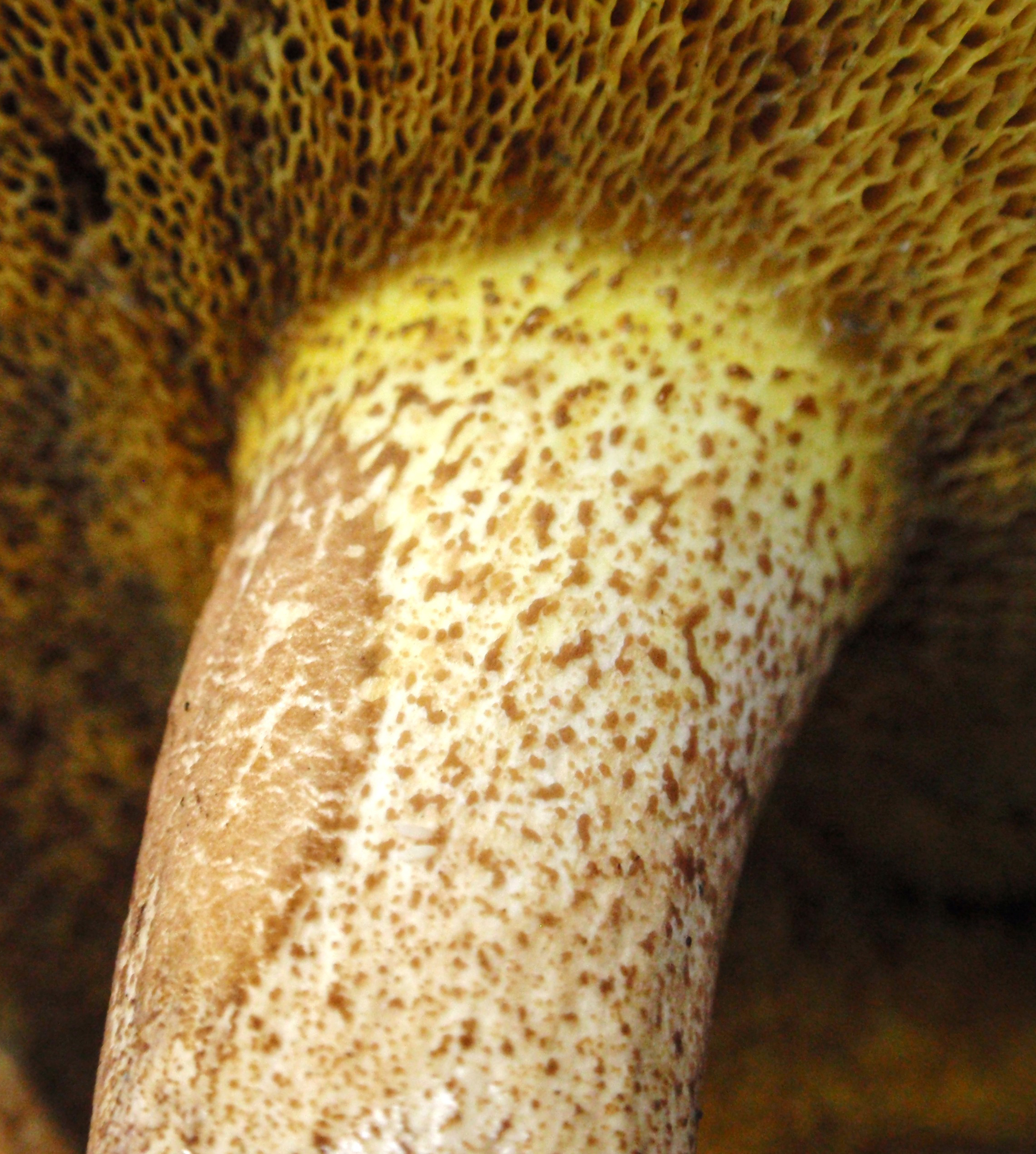
The stipe is covered with irregularly shaped glandular dots.

The cap of S. pungens is roughly convex when young, becoming plano-convex (flat on one side and rounded on the other) to somewhat flat with age, and reaches diameters of 4–14 cm (1 1/2–5 1/2 in). The cap surface is sticky to slimy when moist, becoming shiny when dried. The surface is smooth but is sometimes streaked with the sticky glue-like cap slime when older. The cap color is highly variable in this species, and the cap is often variegated with a mixture of light and dark colors. When young it is dirty-white to olive with pale olive splotches. Maturing caps can retain the color they had when young, or become tawny to orange-yellow to reddish-brown, or a combination of these colors. The cap margin is initially rolled inward and has a cottony roll of white tissue, but becomes naked and curves downward with age. The flesh is 1–2 cm (3/8–3/4 in) thick, white and unchanging in young fruit bodies, frequently changing to yellow when older.

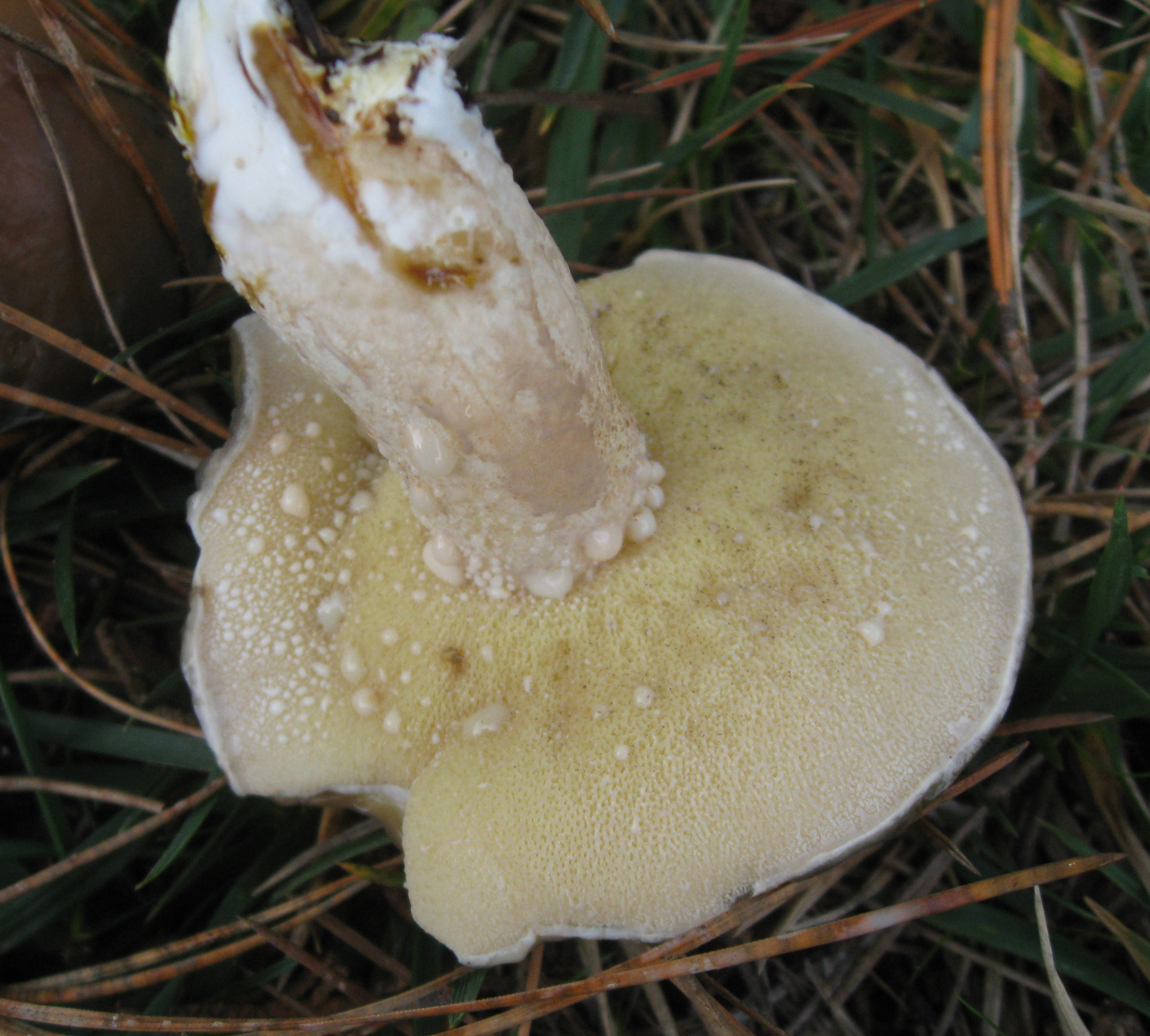
Young fruit bodies are covered with milky droplets on their pore surfaces.

The tubes that comprise the hymenium (spore-bearing tissue) on the underside of the cap are up to 1 cm (3/8 in) long, adnate when young, becoming decurrent or nearly so with age. In young specimens, they are whitish to pale buff, and are covered with milky droplets that become brown to ochraceous when dried. As specimens mature the color of the pore surface changes to yellowish, and finally to dark yellow. The angular pores, which are 1–1.5 mm in diameter, are not radially arranged, and do not change color when bruised. The stipe is solid (rather than hollow), 3–7 cm (1 1/4–2 3/4 in) long, and 1–2 cm (3/8–3/4 in) thick near the top. Its shape is variable: either roughly equal in width throughout, thicker at the base, or somewhat thicker in the middle. Its surface is dry and smooth, and covered with irregularly shaped glandular dots. The dots—minute clumps of pigmented cells—are initially reddish before becoming brownish. The background color of the stipe is initially whitish (roughly the same color as the tubes), but becomes more yellow with age. It does not change color when bruised, and does not have a ring. The flesh of the stipe is white, and does not change color when exposed to air.

The spore print is olive-brown to pale cinnamon-brown. Individual spores are thin-walled, hyaline (translucent), and smooth. Their shape is ellipsoid to roughly cylindrical in face view or inequilateral when viewed in profile, and they measure 9.5–10 by 2.8–3.5 μm. The basidia (spore-bearing cells of the hymenium) are hyaline, club-shaped and four-spored, with dimensions of 33–36 by 8–10 μm. The thin-walled cystidia are rare to scattered on the tube surface but abundant on the pores, where they usually occur in massive clusters. They appear dark brown when mounted in a dilute (3%) solution of potassium hydroxide (KOH), and are cylindric to roughly club-shaped, measuring 43–79 by 7–10 μm. They are usually encrusted with pigment, although some may be hyaline. The tissue comprising the tube is hyaline, and made of divergent to nearly parallel hyphae that are 3–5 μm wide. The pileipellis is a tissue type known as an ixotrichodermium (made of interwoven gelatinized hyphae); it stains brown in KOH, and is made of hyphae that are 4–5 μm wide. The stipe cuticle is made of clusters of cystidia similar to those found in the hymenium. Clamp connections are absent in the hyphae of S. pungens.

Several chemical tests can be employed in the field to aid in the identification of S. pungens. With an application of a drop of KOH, the flesh will turn vinaceous (the color of red wine), the tubes red, the cap cuticle black, and the stipe cuticle pale vinaceous. With ammonium hydroxide (NH_{4}OH), the flesh becomes very pale vinaceous, and the tubes turn bright red. Iron(II) sulfate (FeSO_{4}) turns the flesh gray, the tubes dark gray to black, and the stipe cuticle light gray.

=== Similar species ===
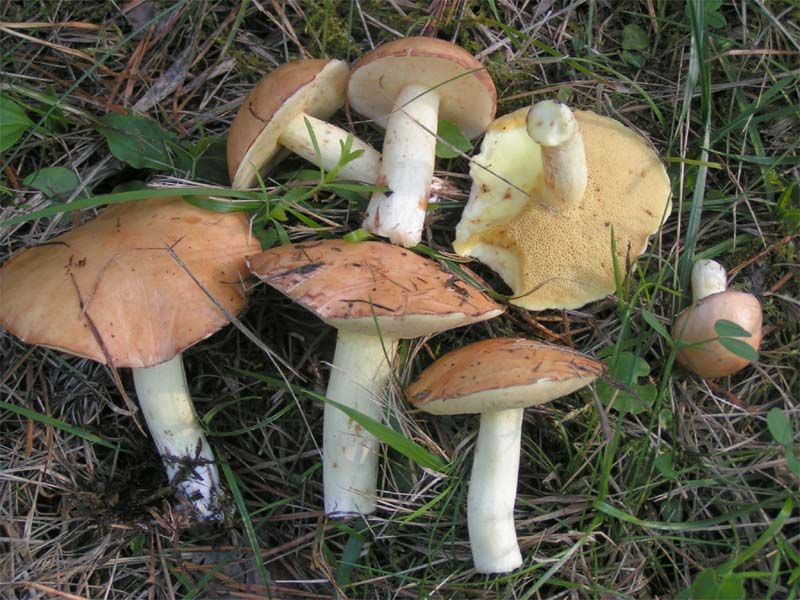
Suillus granulatus

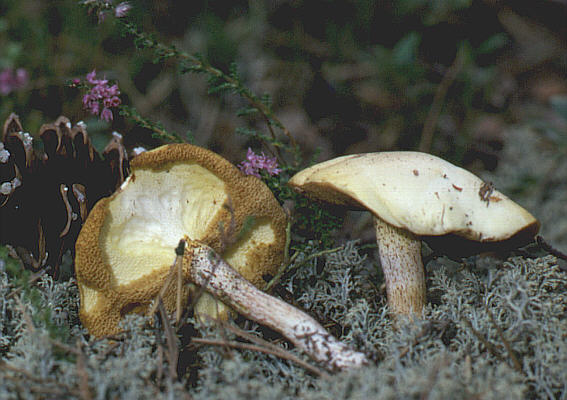
Suillus placidus

Suillus pungens is characterized by the very distinct color changes that occur in the cap as it develops. The range of color variation makes it possible to misidentify the species with others whose color overlaps. Suillus pungens has been misidentified as S. placidus because of the white color of the young fruit bodies and the droplets of exudate. S. placidus has a wider distribution, is usually found in association with eastern white pine, is generally smaller, with a maximum cap diameter up to 9 cm (3 1/2 in), and has smaller spores, measuring 7–9 by 2.5–3.2 μm. It does not have any distinctive taste or odor. North American S. granulatus is another potential lookalike species, and at maturity it is nearly identical to Suillus pungens. The cap of S. granulatus is variable in color, ranging from pale yellow to various shades of brown, while the pore surface is initially whitish, later becoming yellowish, and similar to S. placidus, its typical host is eastern white pine. Unlike S. pungens, it lacks a characteristic odor and taste. The Californian species Suillus glandulosipes has veil material attached to the edge of the cap when young. It also lacks the distinctive changes in cap color during development, is associated with lodgepole pine, has smaller spores (6.6–8.8 by 2.5–3 μm), and lacks any obvious taste and odor. Another Californian species, S. quiescens, newly described in 2010, may resemble S. pungens, especially at maturity. S. quiescens can be distinguished by its lack of white or olive colors when young and by a less glandular stipe when mature.

== Habitat and distribution ==
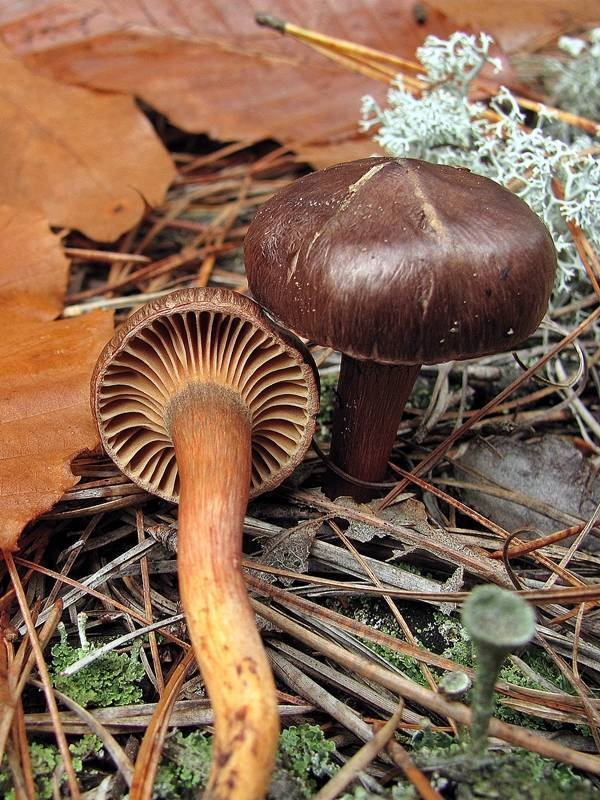
S. pungens is often found growing near Chroogomphus vinicolor (pictured).

Suillus pungens is an ectomycorrhizal basidiomycete that forms symbiotic relationships almost exclusively with Monterey pine (Pinus radiata) and bishop pine (Pinus muricata); some collections have been made under knobcone pine (Pinus attenuata) and ponderosa pine (Pinus ponderosa), but only within the range of Monterey pine. The IUCN Red List assessment reports that, within California, it also occurs in planted and naturalized stands of its native hosts, and with introduced pines including P. pinea, P. pinaster, and P. halepensis, particularly in urban areas. The IUCN assessment also reports introduced records from New Zealand (where it is common with introduced P. radiata) and Australia, apparently via imported pine stock. The primary native hosts, Monterey pine and bishop pine, have small and scattered natural ranges that are largely restricted to coastal California. The fruit bodies of S. pungens grow solitarily, scattered or in groups in humus. They are often found growing near fruit bodies of Chroogomphus vinicolor and Helvella lacunosa.

Suillus pungens is often the most abundant Suillus in the San Francisco Bay Area. The type collection was made on the campus of San Francisco State University, where it occurs in abundance during the fall and winter seasons. Although it occurs most frequently in the autumn and winter, it is one of the few species of Suillus that continue to fruit sporadically throughout the year, especially in wet weather. It has also been identified in the southeastern Sierra Nevada and on Santa Cruz Island. Outside its native range, S. pungens has also been reported among ectomycorrhizal fungi associated with introduced pines in the Hawaiian Islands. An IUCN assessment also reports introduced occurrences in New Zealand (where it is common with introduced P. radiata) and Australia.

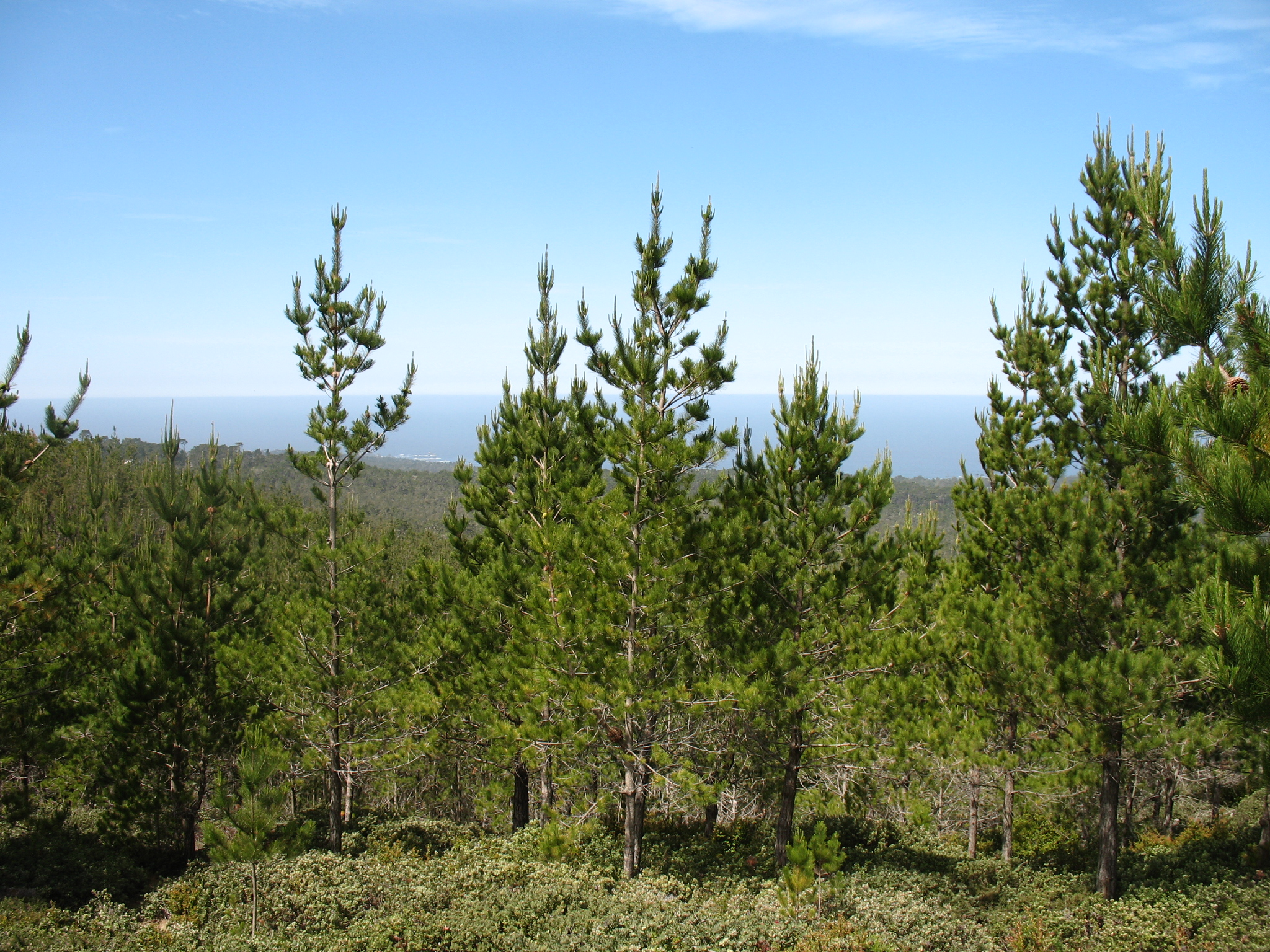
Ectomycorrhizal associates of S. pungens include Monterey pine (above) and bishop pine (below).

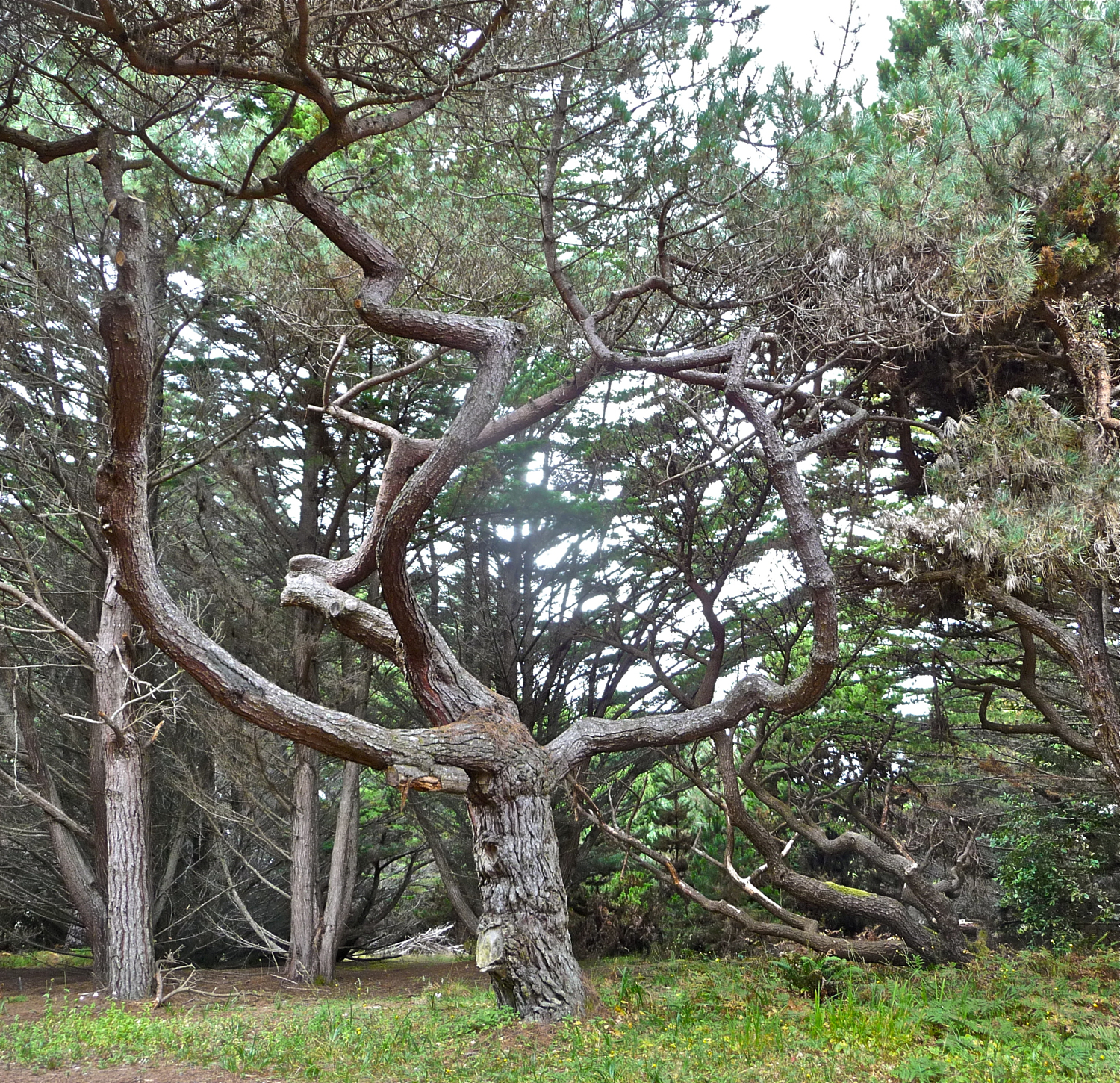

== Ecology ==
In a 1996 study, mycologists Monique Gardes and Thomas Bruns hypothesized that S. pungens, an abundant fruiter in pine forests, would be dominant on the roots of the pine trees. However, by sampling underground ectomycorrhizae in addition to above-ground fruit bodies, they found that the fungus can fruit prolifically while occupying only a small fraction of the ectomycorrhizal root assemblage, which was otherwise dominated by Russula species and Tomentella sublilacina. Gardes and Bruns hypothesized that the disparity between above- and below-ground representation may be because the fungus invests less energy in vegetative growth and persistence and more in fruiting, or alternatively, because the species is particularly efficient at acquiring carbon from its hosts and so needs to colonize only a few rootlets to obtain enough to allow abundant fruiting.

A genet is a group of genetically identical individuals that have grown in a given location, all originating vegetatively from a single ancestor. In field studies, the approximate size of fungal genets is typically estimated by collecting and mapping fruit bodies on a site, determining which fruit bodies are genetically identical by either somatic incompatibility or various molecular techniques, and then determining the distance between identical fruit bodies. A 1998 study by Pierluigi Bonello and colleagues used single-strand conformation polymorphism analysis to detect minute genetic differences among S. pungens genets, and showed that most of the fruiting occurred from a single large genet. This result indicates that the fungus persists because of extensive vegetative growth, rather than frequent establishment of new genets from spores, and that it uses carbon resources efficiently. The study also described an S. pungens genet with an area of approximately 300 m^{2} (3,200 sq ft) and a span greater than 40 m (130 ft) across, which was at the time the largest EM fungal genet reported. The large S. pungens genet was not detected after wildfire, demonstrating that it did not survive in the absence of a host, and suggesting that spores are the primary means by which the fungus recolonizes after a fire.

Although most ectomycorrhizal fungi disperse spores mainly over short distances, Suillus species can disperse at kilometer scales. In a native-forest study, S. pungens was reported as the only ectomycorrhizal fungus able to colonize pine seedlings more than 1 km (0.62 mi) from native pine forests, and its spore production was estimated at about 8×10^{12} spores per km^{2}. Other ectomycorrhizal fungi in the same system produced far fewer spores and did not successfully colonize seedlings away from the forest edge. In a soil-burial experiment at Point Reyes, researchers buried non-sterile soil collected beneath bishop pine in an area with little ectomycorrhizal inoculum, then later tested the soil for viable ectomycorrhizal propagules by "baiting" it with bishop pine seedlings. Suillus pungens was detected among the fungi recovered in the year-1 bioassays, but it was not recovered when the same buried soil was assayed after 6 years. Because S. pungens was already rare in the year-1 sample (and because sampling intensity differed between years), the authors cautioned that its absence at year 6 is not, by itself, strong evidence that its spores cannot persist for years in soil. They instead argue that S. pungens is an effective disperser and spore colonizer, and that patterns such as its reappearance after stand-replacing fires can be explained without assuming a long-lived soil spore bank (i.e., establishment from spores rather than hyphal survival, and potentially from recent dispersal).

In growth-chamber experiments with bishop pine, Suillus pungens showed a strong short-term (acute) response to drying but little sustained (chronic) change in gene expression after prolonged low watering. After 5–15 days without watering, roughly one fifth of genes changed expression in the soil-foraging mycelium, and substantial shifts were also detected in the fungus on ectomycorrhizal root tips. By contrast, after 10 weeks of reduced watering, pine seedling growth and fungal root colonization were reduced by about half, yet only a small number of fungal genes differed from well-watered controls, a pattern consistent with acclimation to longer drought. During acute drying, both root-associated and soil mycelium showed coordinated expression changes that are consistent with reduced protein synthesis alongside increased investment in osmotic protection and hyphal maintenance (for example, trehalose-related and cell wall-associated functions).

== Edibility ==
The mushroom is considered edible, but not choice. Its taste is harsh, nauseating, and weakly acidic; the odor is strong and ranges from pleasant, resembling bananas, to pungent. When collecting for the table, young specimens are preferred, as according to David Arora, older ones "literally seethe with fat, agitated maggots and sag with so much excess moisture that they practically demand to be wrung out like a sponge!" Michael Kuo's 100 Edible Mushrooms (2007) rates the mushroom's edibility as "bad" and warns that dishes cooked with the mushroom will assume an unpleasant taste.

== See also ==
- List of North American boletes
