= Pine bolete =

Pine bolete is a common name for several mushrooms and may refer to:

- Suillus bellinii
- Boletus pinophilus
