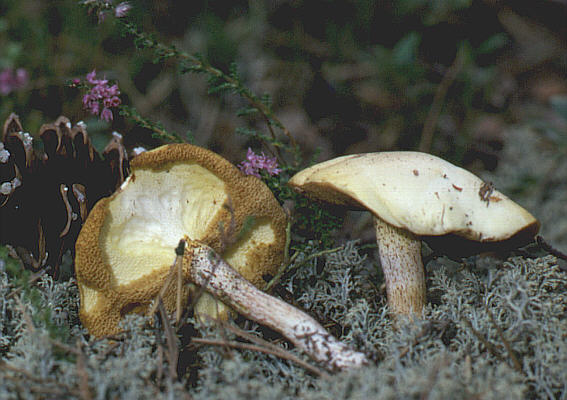

Scientific classification
- Kingdom: Fungi
- Division: Basidiomycota
- Class: Agaricomycetes
- Order: Boletales
- Family: Suillaceae
- Genus: Suillus
- Species: S. placidus

Binomial name
- Suillus placidus (Bonord.) Singer 1945

= Suillus placidus =

Species of fungus

Suillus placidus is a species of fungus in the genus Suillus. It is an edible pored mushroom found in European and North American coniferous forests, growing in association with several species of pine of the subgenus Strobus.

== Description ==
The cap of Suillus placidus is hemispherical when young, later becoming convex. It is ivory white in colour and very slimy, growing to 10 cm in diameter. The stem is slender, ringless and ivory white with grey granular dots or blotches near the top. The soft flesh is yellowish white with a mild taste. The spores are ochre.

== Ecology ==
Suillus placidus is found in Asia, Europe and North America occurring exclusively alongside species of five-needled pine of the subgenus Strobus. The ectomycorrhizal association is beneficial for both fungus and tree, and is a form of symbiosis.

In Asia, it is known to occur in the Russian Far East with Siberian pine (Pinus sibirica), Siberian dwarf pine (P. pumila) and Korean pine (P. koraiensis). It has also been reported in China.

It is rarely seen in Europe, where it is known to form ectomycorrhizal associations with Swiss pine (Pinus cembra) and introduced eastern white pine (P. strobus). In north-eastern North America, its range coincides with that of the native eastern white pine (P. strobus).

The fungus fruits in summer and autumn with fruiting bodies occurring singly or in small groups.

== Edibility ==
Suillus placidus is reportedly edible, but of mediocre quality.

== See also ==
- List of North American boletes
