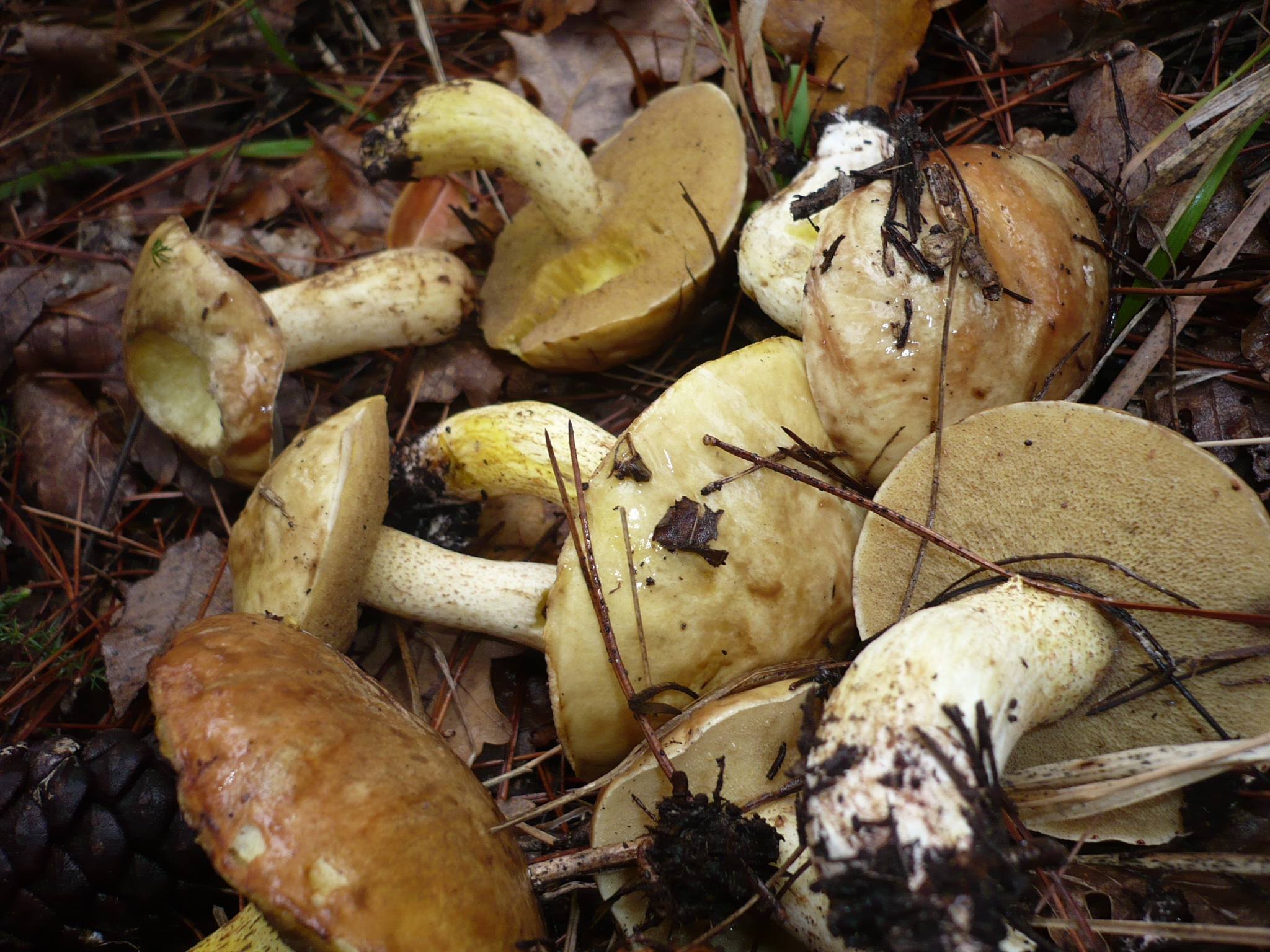

Scientific classification
- Domain: Eukaryota
- Kingdom: Fungi
- Division: Basidiomycota
- Class: Agaricomycetes
- Order: Boletales
- Family: Suillaceae
- Genus: Suillus
- Species: S. mediterraneensis

Binomial name
- Suillus mediterraneensis (Jacquet. & J.Blum) Redeuilh (1992)

Synonyms
- Boletus mediterraneensis Jacquet. & J.Blum (1969)

= Suillus mediterraneensis =

Species of fungus

Suillus mediterraneensis Mycological characteristics
- Pores on hymenium
- Cap is convex
- Stipe is bare
- Spore print is brown
- Ecology is mycorrhizal
- Edibility is edible

Suillus mediterraneensis is a species of edible mushroom in the genus Suillus. It is found in Europe within Coniferous forests, mycorrhizal with two-needled pines (Pinus halepensis, P. pinea, P. pinaster). Originally named Boletus mediterraneensis in 1969, It was transferred to Suillus in 1992. It is similar to Suillus granulatus, but is distinguished by yellowish and not white flesh.
