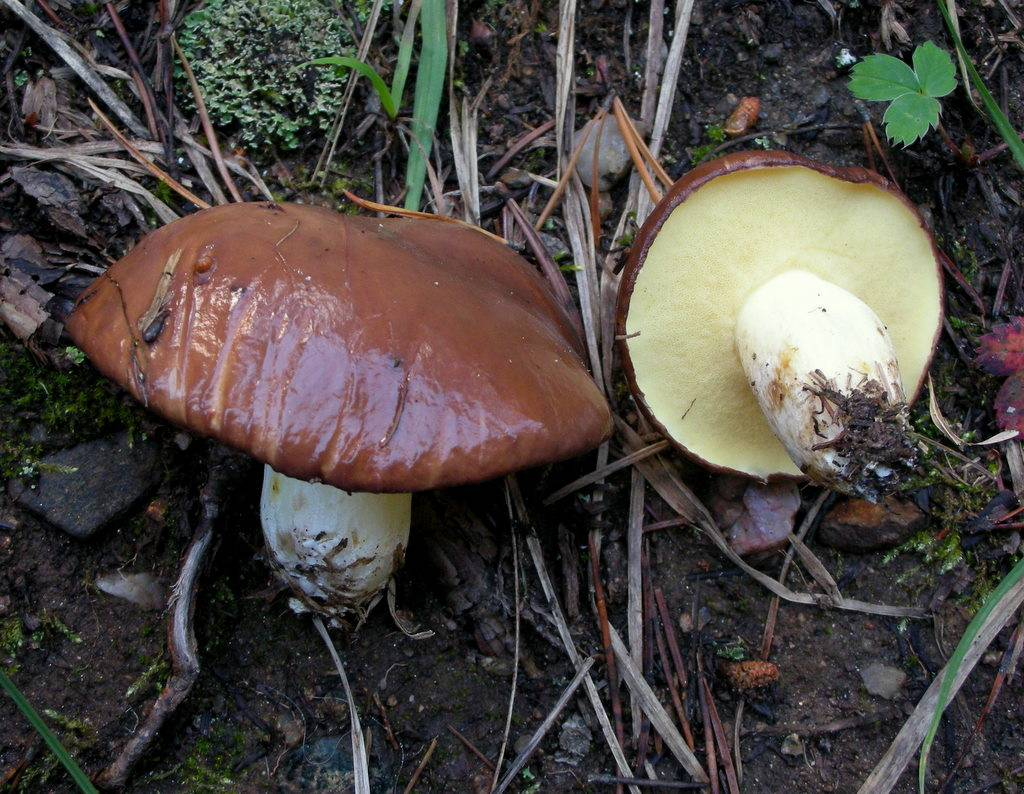

Conservation status
- Secure (NatureServe)

Scientific classification
- Kingdom: Fungi
- Division: Basidiomycota
- Class: Agaricomycetes
- Order: Boletales
- Family: Suillaceae
- Genus: Suillus
- Species: S. brevipes

Binomial name
- Suillus brevipes (Peck) Kuntze (1898)

Synonyms
- Boletus brevipes Peck (1885); Boletus viscosus Frost (1885); Rostkovites brevipes (Peck) Murrill (1948)

= Suillus brevipes =

Species of edible fungus in the family Suillaceae found throughout North America

Suillus brevipes
- Mycological characteristics
- Pores on hymenium
- Cap is convex or flat
- Hymenium is adnate or decurrent
- Stipe is bare
- Spore print is brown
- Ecology is mycorrhizal
- Edibility is choice

Suillus brevipes is a species of fungus in the family Suillaceae. First described by American mycologists in the late 19th century, it is commonly known as the stubby-stalk or the short-stemmed slippery Jack. The fruit bodies (mushrooms) produced by the fungus are characterized by a chocolate to reddish-brown cap covered with a sticky layer of slime, and a short whitish stipe that has neither a partial veil nor prominent, colored glandular dots. The cap can reach a diameter of about 10 cm (4 in), while the stipe is up to 6 cm (2 3/8 in) long and 2 cm (3/4 in) thick. Like other bolete mushrooms, S. brevipes produces spores in a vertically arranged layer of spongy tubes with openings that form a layer of small yellowish pores on the underside of the cap.

Suillus brevipes grows in a mycorrhizal association with various species of two- and three-needled pines, especially lodgepole and ponderosa pine. The fungus is found throughout North America, and has been introduced to several other countries via transplanted pines. In the succession of mycorrhizal fungi associated with the regrowth of jack pine after clearcutting or wildfires, S. brevipes is a multi-stage fungus, found during all stages of tree development. The mushrooms are edible, and are high in the essential fatty acid linoleic acid.

== Taxonomy ==
The species was first described scientifically as Boletus viscosus by American mycologist Charles Frost in 1874. In 1885, Charles Horton Peck, who had found specimens in pine woods of Albany County, New York, explained that the species name was a taxonomic homonym (Boletus viscosus already being in use for another species named by Ventenat in 1863) and so renamed it to Boletus brevipes. Its current name was assigned by German Otto Kuntze in 1898. William Alphonso Murrill renamed it as Rostkovites brevipes in 1948; the genus Rostkovites is now considered to be synonymous with Suillus.

Agaricales specialist Rolf Singer included Suillus brevipes in the subsection Suillus of genus Suillus, an infrageneric (a taxonomic level below genus) grouping of species characterized by a cinnamon-brown spore print, and pores less than 1 mm wide.

The specific epithet is derived from the Latin brevipes, meaning "short-footed". The mushroom is commonly known as the "stubby-stalk" or the "short-stemmed slippery Jack".

== Description ==
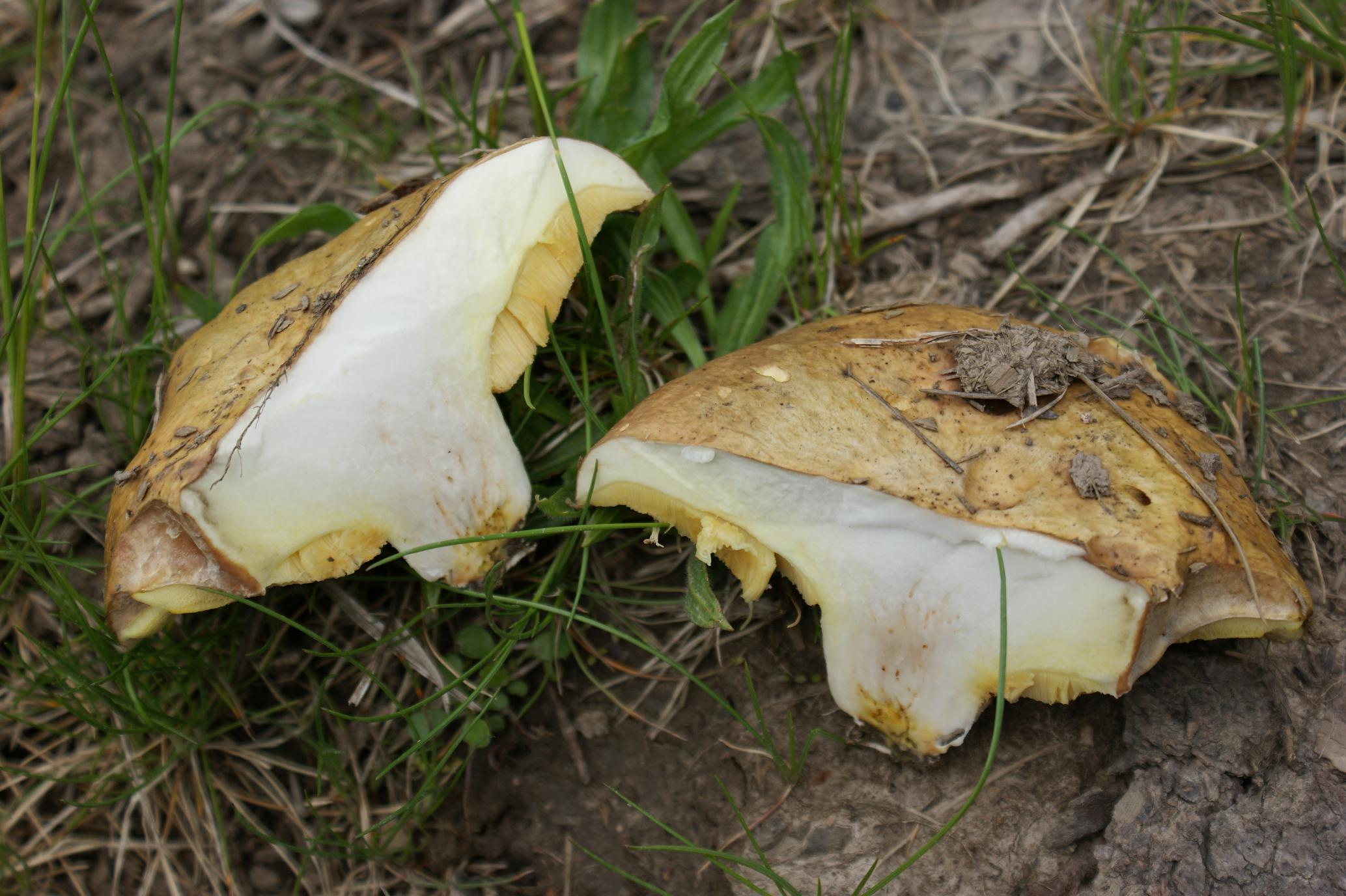
The cap flesh is white or pale yellow, and does not change color when cut.

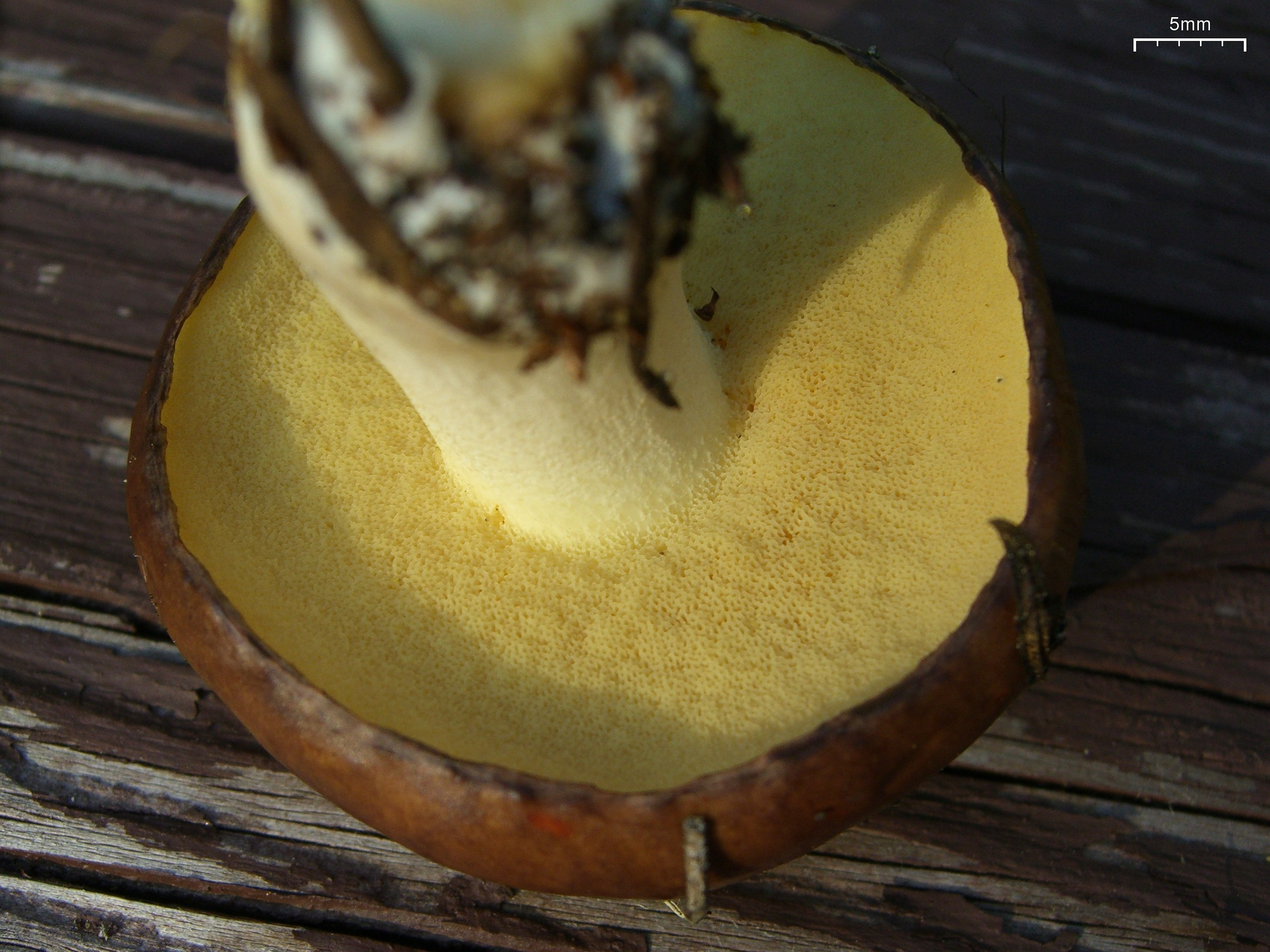
The pores on the underside of the cap are minute, typically 2–3 per millimeter.

The cap is deep brown to reddish-brown, fading to tan or yellowish with age, and it does not bruise with handling. The cap surface is smooth, and, depending on the moisture in the environment, may range from sticky to the touch to slimy. Depending on its maturity, the cap shape may range from spherical to broadly convex. The cap diameter measures 5–10 cm (2–3 7/8 in), and the cap cuticle can be peeled from the surface. The tubes are yellow, becoming olive-green with age, and they have an attachment to the stipe that ranges from adnate (with most of the tube fused to the stipe) to decurrent (with the tubes broadly attached, but running somewhat down the length of the stipe). They are typically up to 1 cm (3/8 in) deep, and there are about 1–2 tube mouths (pores) per millimeter. The pores are pale yellow, round, 1–2 mm wide, and do not change color when bruised.

The stipe is white to pale yellow, dry, solid, not bruising, and pruinose (having a very fine whitish powder on the surface). A characteristic feature of many Suillus species are the glandular dots found on the stipe—clumps of hyphal cell ends through which the fungus secretes various metabolic wastes, leaving a sticky or resinous "dot". In S. brevipes, the form of the glandular dots is variable: they may be absent, slightly underdeveloped or obscurely formed with age. The stipe is usually short in comparison to the diameter of the cap, typically 2–6 cm (3/4–2 3/8 in) long and 1–2 cm (3/8–3/4 in) thick. It is either of equal width throughout, or may taper downwards; its surface bears minute puncture holes at maturity, and is it slightly fibrous at the base. Collections made in New Zealand tend to have a reddish coloration at the very base of the stipe. The flesh of the mushroom is initially white, but turns pale yellow in age. The odor and taste are mild. The spore print is cinnamon-brown.

=== Microscopic characteristics ===
The spores are elliptical to oblong, smooth, and have dimensions of 7–10 by 3–4 μm. The spore-bearing cells, the basidia, are thin-walled, club-shaped to roughly cylindrical, and measure 2–25 by 5–7 μm. They bear either two or four spores. The pleurocystidia (cystidia that are found on the face of a gill) are roughly cylindrical with rounded ends, thin-walled, and 40–55 by 5–8 μm. The cells often have brown contents, and in the presence of 2% potassium hydroxide (KOH) will appear hyaline (translucent) or vinaceous (red wine-colored); in Melzer's reagent they become pale yellow or brown. The cheilocystidia (cystidia found on the edge of a gill) are 30–60 by 7–10 μm, club-shaped to almost cylindrical, thin-walled, with brown incrusting material at the base, and arranged like a bundle of fibers. In KOH they appear hyaline, and are pale yellow in Melzer's reagent. Caulocystidia (found on the stipe) are 60–90 by 7–9 μm, mostly cylindrical with rounded ends, and arranged in bundles with brown pigment particles at the base. The caulocystidia stain vinaceous in KOH. The cuticle of the cap is made of a layer of interwoven gelatinous hyphae that are individually 2–5 μm thick; the gelatinous hyphae are responsible for the sliminess of the cuticle. There are no clamp connections in the hyphae.

=== Similar species ===
Several Suillus species which grow under pines could be confused with S. brevipes. S. granulatus has a longer stipe, and distinct raised granules on the stipe. S. brevipes is differentiated from S. albidipes by not having a cottony roll of velar tissue (derived from a partial veil) at the margin when young. S. pallidiceps is by distinguished its pale yellow cap color; and S. albivelatus has a veil. S. pungens has a characteristic pungent odor, compared to the mild smell of S. brevipes, and like S. granulatus, has glandular dots on the stipe. Aureoboletus flaviporus is also similar.

Molecular phylogenetic analyses of ribosomal DNA sequences shows that the most closely related species to S. brevipes include S. luteus, S. pseudobrevipes, and S. weaverae.

== Habitat and distribution ==
Suillus brevipes grows singly, scattered, or in groups on the ground in late summer and autumn. A common—and sometimes abundant—mushroom, it occurs over most of North America (including Hawaii), from Canada to Mexico.

This species has been found in Puerto Rico growing under planted Pinus caribaea, where it is thought to have been introduced inadvertently from North Carolina by the USDA Forest Service in 1955. Other introductions have also occurred in exotic pine plantations in Argentina, India, New Zealand, Japan, and Taiwan.

== Ecology ==
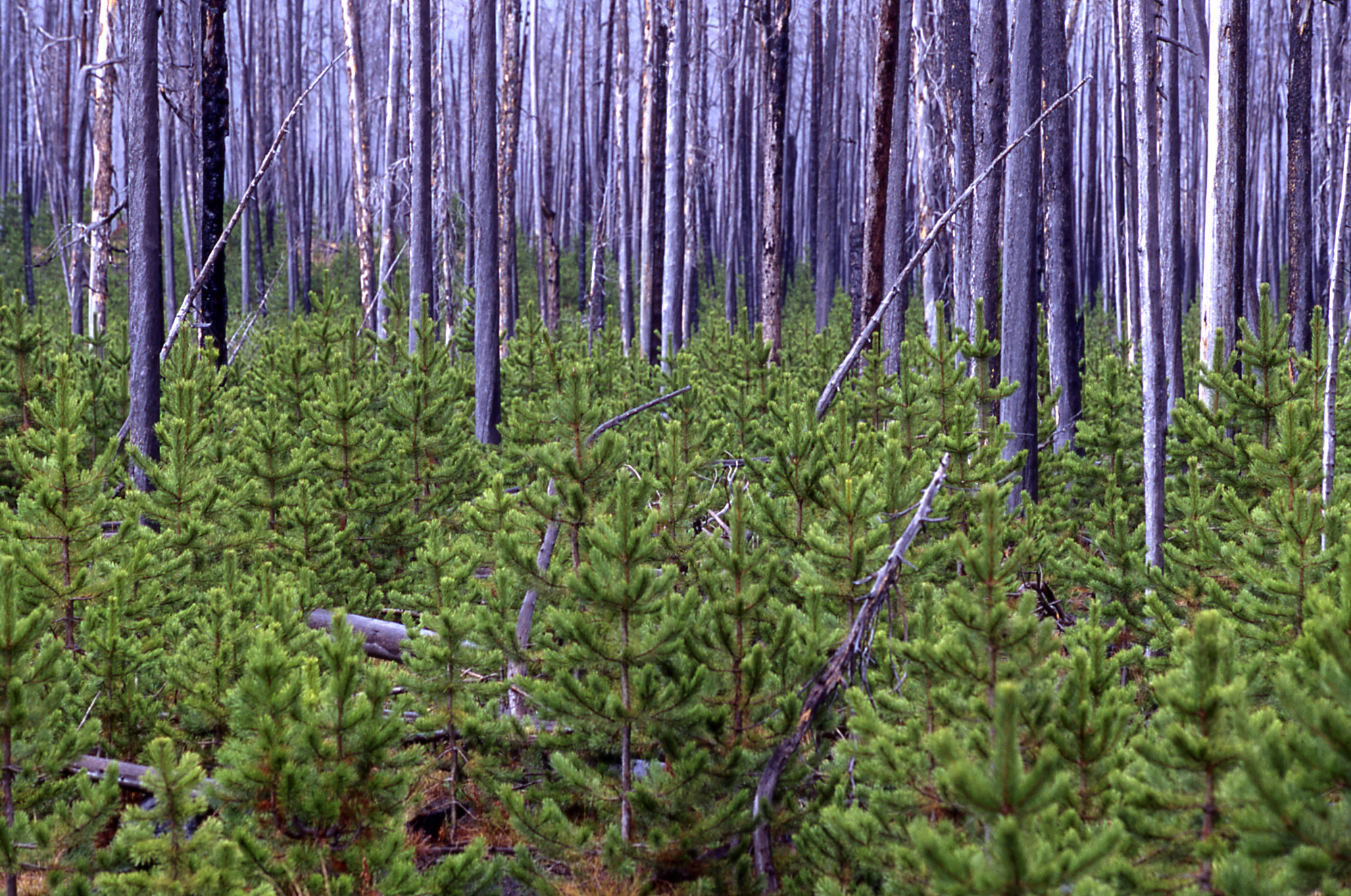
S. brevipes appears early in the succession of mycorrhizal fungi during the regrowth of pine after wildfire.

Suillus brevipes is a mycorrhizal fungus, and it develops a close symbiotic association with the roots of various tree species, especially pine. The underground mycelia form a sheath around the tree rootlets, and the fungal hyphae penetrate between the cortical cells of the root, forming ectomycorrhizae. In this way, the fungus can supply the tree with minerals, while the tree reciprocates by supplying carbohydrates created by photosynthesis. In nature, it associates with two- and three-needle pines, especially lodgepole and ponderosa pine. Under controlled laboratory conditions, the fungus has been shown to form ectomycorrhizae with ponderosa, lodgepole, loblolly, eastern white, patula, pond, radiata, and red pines. In vitro mycorrhizal associations formed with non-pine species include Pacific madrone, bearberry, western larch, Sitka spruce, and coast Douglas-fir. Fungal growth is inhibited by the presence of high levels of the heavy metals cadmium (350 ppm), lead (200 ppm), and nickel (20 ppm).

During the regrowth of pine trees after disturbance like clearcutting or wildfire, there appears an orderly sequence of mycorrhizal fungi as one species is replaced by another. A study on the ecological succession of ectomycorrhizal fungi in Canadian jack pine forests following wildfire concluded that S. brevipes is a multi-stage fungus. It appears relatively early during tree development; fruit bodies were common in 6-year-old tree stands, and the fungus colonized the highest proportion of root tips. The fungus persists throughout the life of the tree, having been found in tree stands that were 41, 65, and 122 years old. There is, however, a relative reduction in the prevalence of the fungus with increasing stand age, which may be attributed to increased competition from other fungi, and a change in habitat brought about by closure of the forest canopy. Generally, S. brevipes responds favorably to silvicultural practices such as thinning and clearcutting. A 1996 study demonstrated that fruit bodies increased in abundance as the severity of disturbance increased. It has been suggested that the thick-walled, wiry rhizomorphs produced by the fungus may serve as an adaptation that helps it to survive and remain viable for a period of time following disturbance.

The mushrooms are common in the diet of grizzly bears in Yellowstone National Park.

== Uses ==
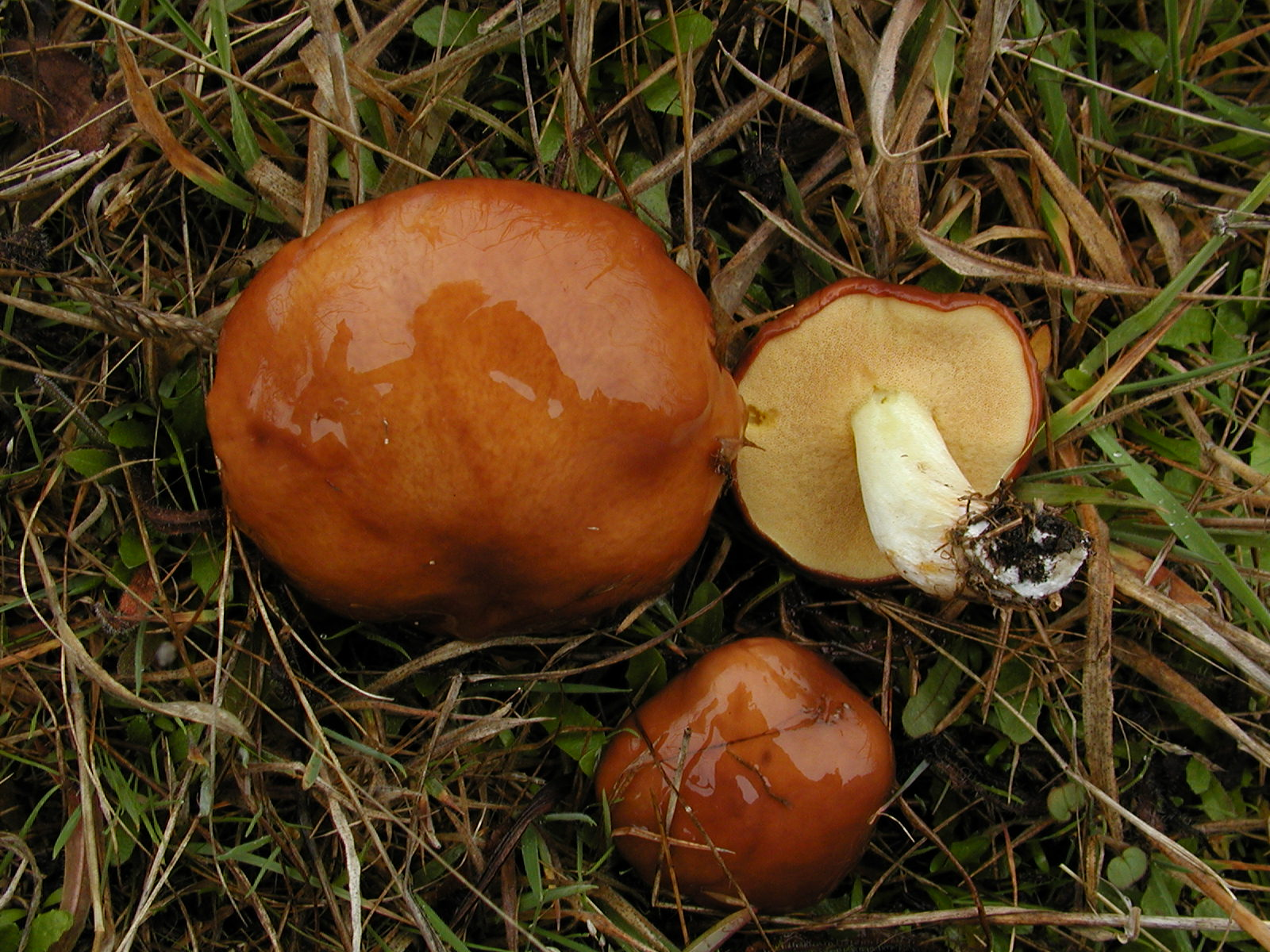
Sources recommend peeling off the slimy cap cuticle before eating the mushroom.

Like many species of the genus Suillus, S. brevipes is edible, and the mushroom is considered choice by some. The odor is mild, and the taste mild or slightly acidic. Field guides typically recommended to remove the slimy cap cuticle, and, in older specimens, the tube layer before consumption.

The fatty acid composition of S. brevipes fruit bodies has been analyzed. The cap contained a higher lipid content than the stipe—18.4% of the dry weight, compared to 12.4%. In the cap, linoleic acid made up 50.7% of the total lipids (65.7% in the stipe), oleic acid was 29.9% (12.4% in the stipe), followed by palmitic acid at 10.5% (12.6% in the stipe). Linoleic acid—a member of the group of essential fatty acids called omega-6 fatty acids—is an essential dietary requirement for humans.

== See also ==
- List of North American boletes
