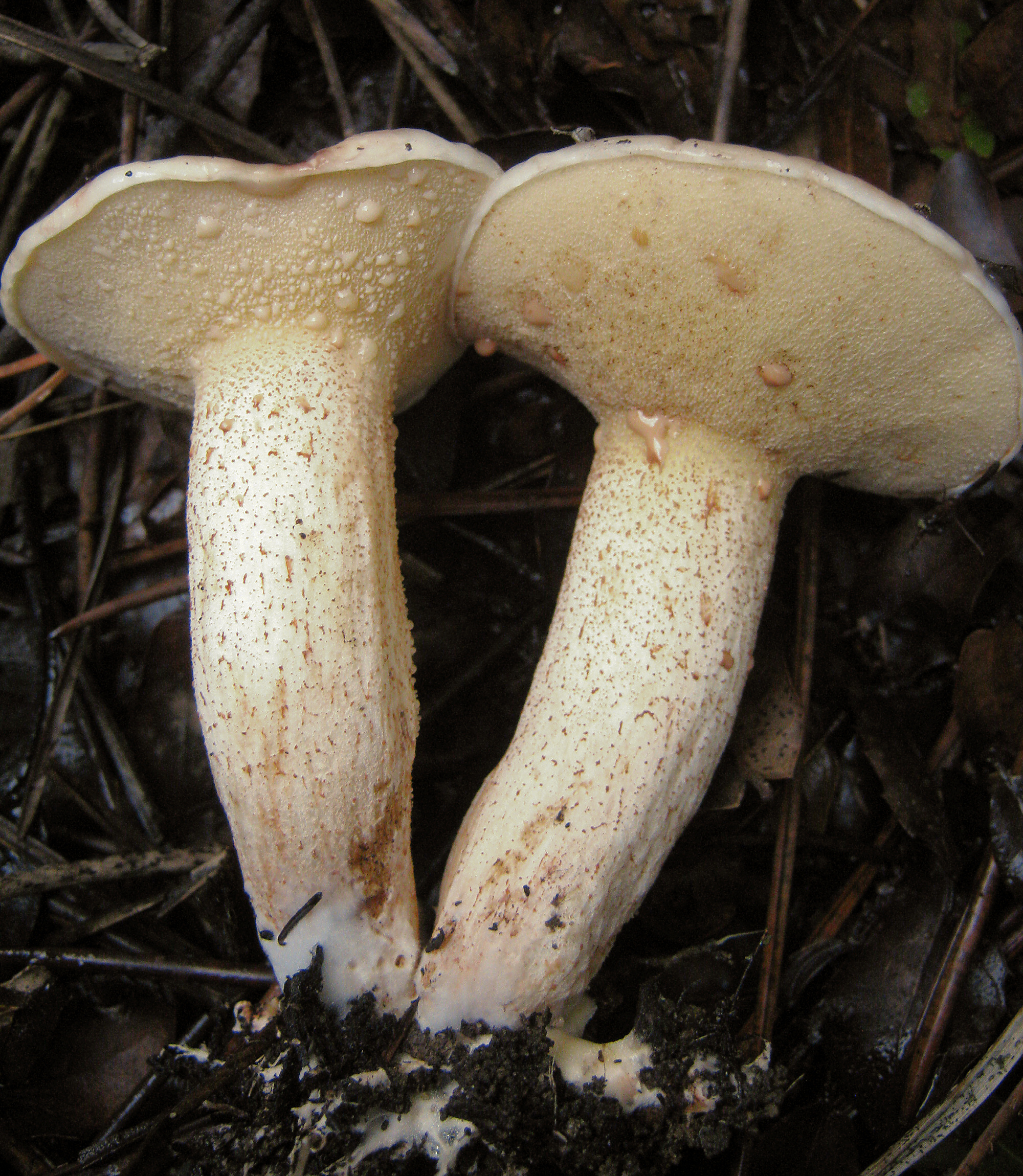

Scientific classification
- Domain: Eukaryota
- Kingdom: Fungi
- Division: Basidiomycota
- Class: Agaricomycetes
- Order: Boletales
- Family: Suillaceae
- Genus: Suillus
- Species: S. bellinii

Binomial name
- Suillus bellinii (Inzenga) Watling (1967)

Synonyms
- Boletus bellinii Inzenga (1879); Ixocomus bellinii (Inzenga) Maire (1933); Rostkovites bellinii (Inzenga) Reichert (1940)

= Suillus bellinii =

Species of fungus

Suillus bellinii Mycological characteristics
- Pores on hymenium
- Cap is convex or flat
- Hymenium is adnate or decurrent
- Stipe is bare
- Spore print is brown
- Ecology is mycorrhizal
- Edibility is edible

Suillus bellinii, the Champagne bolete, is a pored mushroom of the genus Suillus in the family Suillaceae. It is found in coastal pine forests of southern Europe.

== Description ==
The cap is initially convex and irregular, but becomes flatter with maturity, reaching up to 15 cm in diameter. The thick cuticle is brown and marbled with white to gray tones towards the periphery, especially in young specimens. It is very viscid during wet weather and peels easily - characteristics shared by many species of Suillus. The tubes are short, while the pores are small and coloured whitish, beige and, with maturity, yellowish. The pores may exude a reddish latex in fresh specimens.

The stem is short, cylindrical and coloured whitish, ornamented with reddish dots along its length. The firm flesh is whitish and yellowish in the stipe base and it is said to have a fruity odour and a pleasant taste. It is often infested with insect larvae. In a colour reaction test with ammonia solution, the flesh turns crimson.

The spores are ochre-brown in colour, fusiform, sized 8-10 by 3.5-4.5 μm.

== Habitat ==
Suillus bellinii is a thermophilic fungus, occurring in the Mediterranean region of southern Europe in coastal pine forests. It forms ectomycorrhizal associations with species of pine including Aleppo pine (Pinus halepensis), maritime pine (Pinus pinaster) and stone pine (Pinus pinea).

== Edibility ==
It is reportedly edible. Removal of the slimy cap cuticle is recommended.

== Similar species ==
Suillus bellinii often shares its habitat with Suillus mediterraneensis. The flesh of the latter species is yellow.
