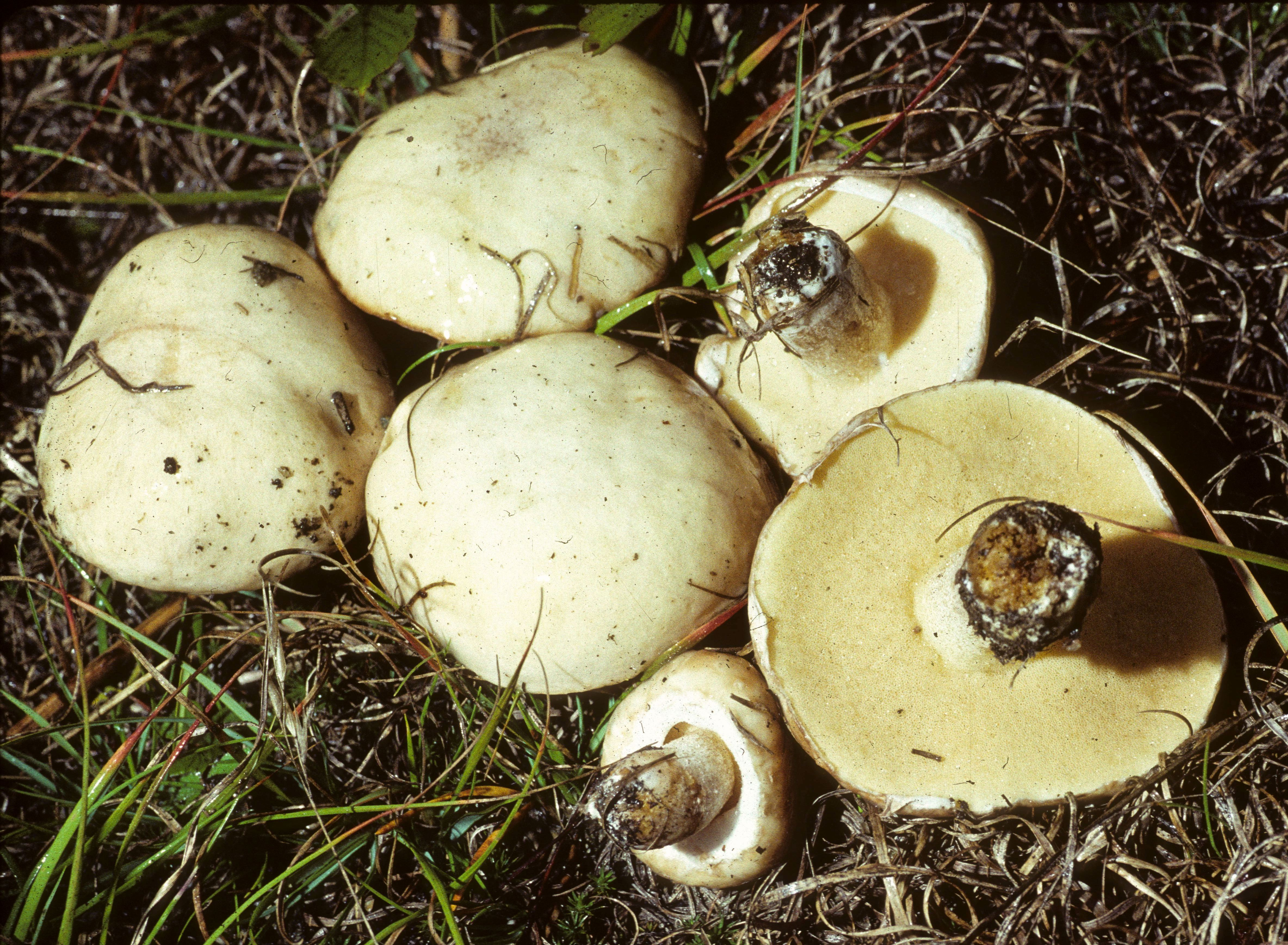

Scientific classification
- Domain: Eukaryota
- Kingdom: Fungi
- Division: Basidiomycota
- Class: Agaricomycetes
- Order: Boletales
- Family: Suillaceae
- Genus: Suillus
- Species: S. neoalbidipes

Binomial name
- Suillus neoalbidipes M.E.Palm & E.L.Stewart (1984)

= Suillus neoalbidipes =

Species of fungus

Suillus neoalbidipes Mycological characteristics
- Pores on hymenium
- Cap is convex
- Stipe is bare
- Spore print is brown
- Ecology is mycorrhizal
- Edibility is edible

Suillus neoalbidipes is a species of edible mushroom in the genus Suillus. It was described as a new species by Mary Palm and Elwin Stewart in 1984.

== See also ==
- List of North American boletes
