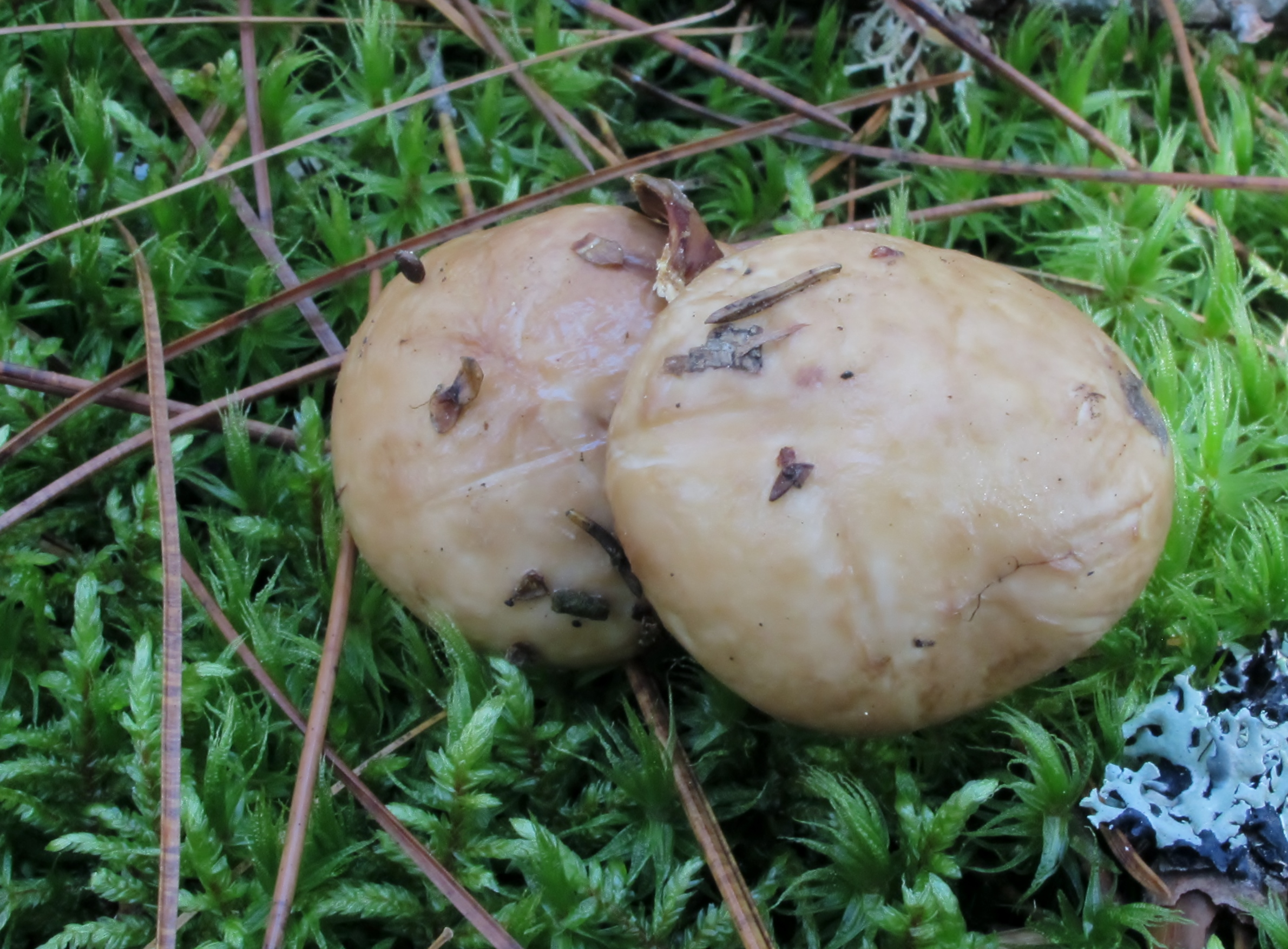

Scientific classification
- Domain: Eukaryota
- Kingdom: Fungi
- Division: Basidiomycota
- Class: Agaricomycetes
- Order: Boletales
- Family: Suillaceae
- Genus: Suillus
- Species: S. glandulosipes

Binomial name
- Suillus glandulosipes Thiers & A.H.Sm. (1964)

= Suillus glandulosipes =

Species of fungus

Suillus glandulosipes Mycological characteristics
- Pores on hymenium
- Cap is convex
- Stipe is bare
- Spore print is brown
- Ecology is mycorrhizal
- Edibility is edible

Suillus glandulosipes is a species of edible mushroom in the genus Suillus. It was first described scientifically by American mycologists Harry D. Thiers and Alexander H. Smith in 1964.
