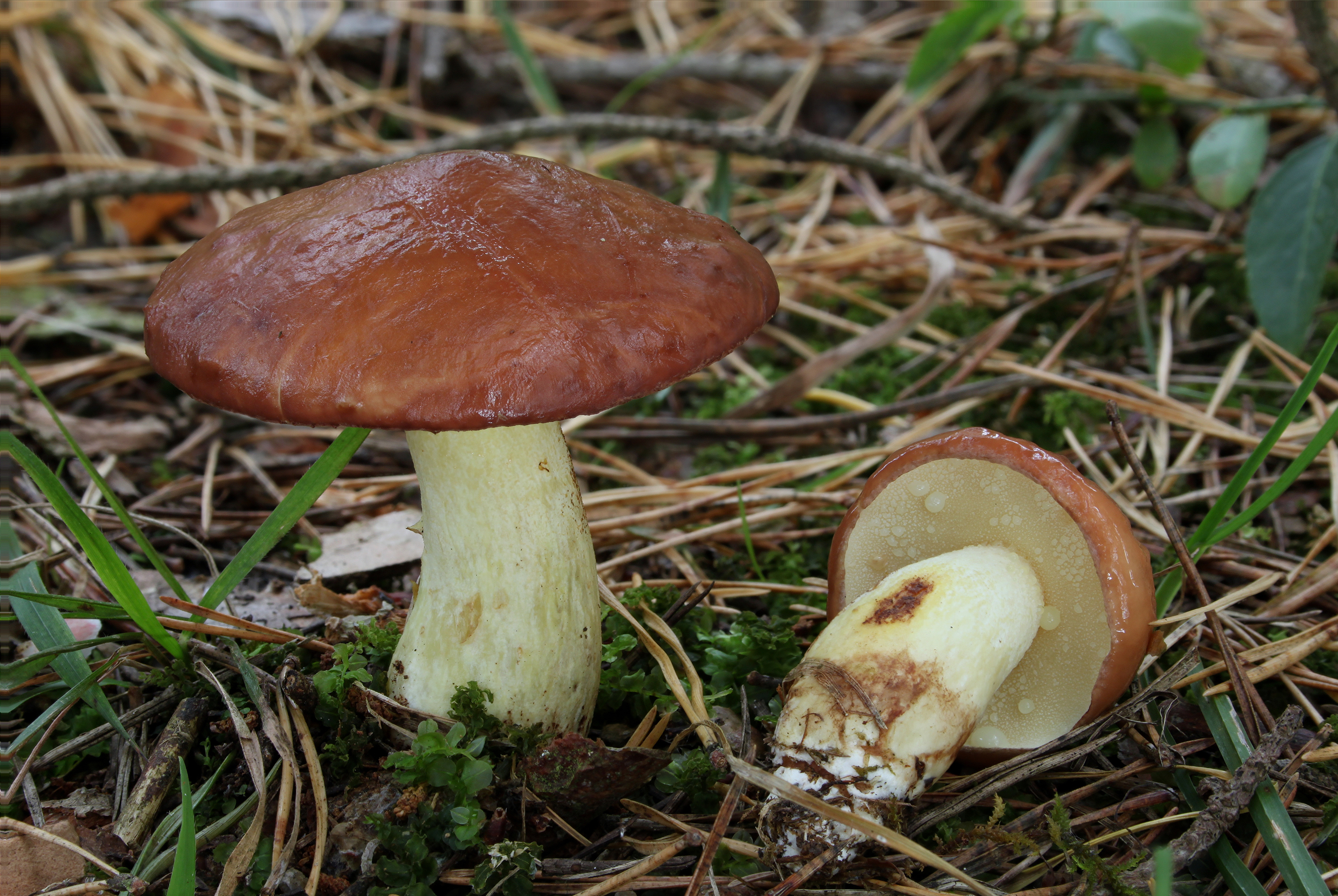

Conservation status
- Least Concern (IUCN 3.1)

Scientific classification
- Kingdom: Fungi
- Division: Basidiomycota
- Class: Agaricomycetes
- Order: Boletales
- Family: Suillaceae
- Genus: Suillus
- Species: S. granulatus

Binomial name
- Suillus granulatus (L.) Roussel (1796)

Synonyms
- Boletus granulatus L. (1753); Boletus lactifluus Sowerby (1809); Suillus lactifluus A.H. Sm. & Thiers (1968); Suillus Weaverae Kretzer & T.D.Bruns (1996)

= Suillus granulatus =

Species of fungus

Suillus granulatus
- Mycological characteristics
- Pores on hymenium
- Cap is flat or convex
- Hymenium is adnate or decurrent
- Stipe is bare
- Spore print is brown
- Ecology is mycorrhizal
- Edibility is edible

Suillus granulatus is a species of fungus in the genus Suillus. It has been commonly known as the weeping bolete or the granulated bolete. It is a pored mushroom similar to S. luteus, but can be distinguished by its ringless stalk.

The species often grows in a symbiosis (mycorrhiza) with pine. It is native to the Northern Hemisphere and has been introduced elsewhere. It is edible.

== Taxonomy ==
Suillus granulatus was first described by Carl Linnaeus in 1753 as a species of Boletus. It was given its current name by French naturalist Henri François Anne de Roussel when he transferred it to Suillus in 1796. Suillus is an ancient term for fungi, and is derived from the word "swine". Granulatus means "grainy" and refers to the granular dots on the upper part of the stem. However, in some specimens the granular dots may be inconspicuous and not darkening with age; thus the name S. lactifluus, "oozing milk" was formerly applied to this form as it is not notably characterized by granular dots.

Previously thought to exist in eastern North America, that species has now been confirmed to be the rediscovered Suillus weaverae.

== Description ==
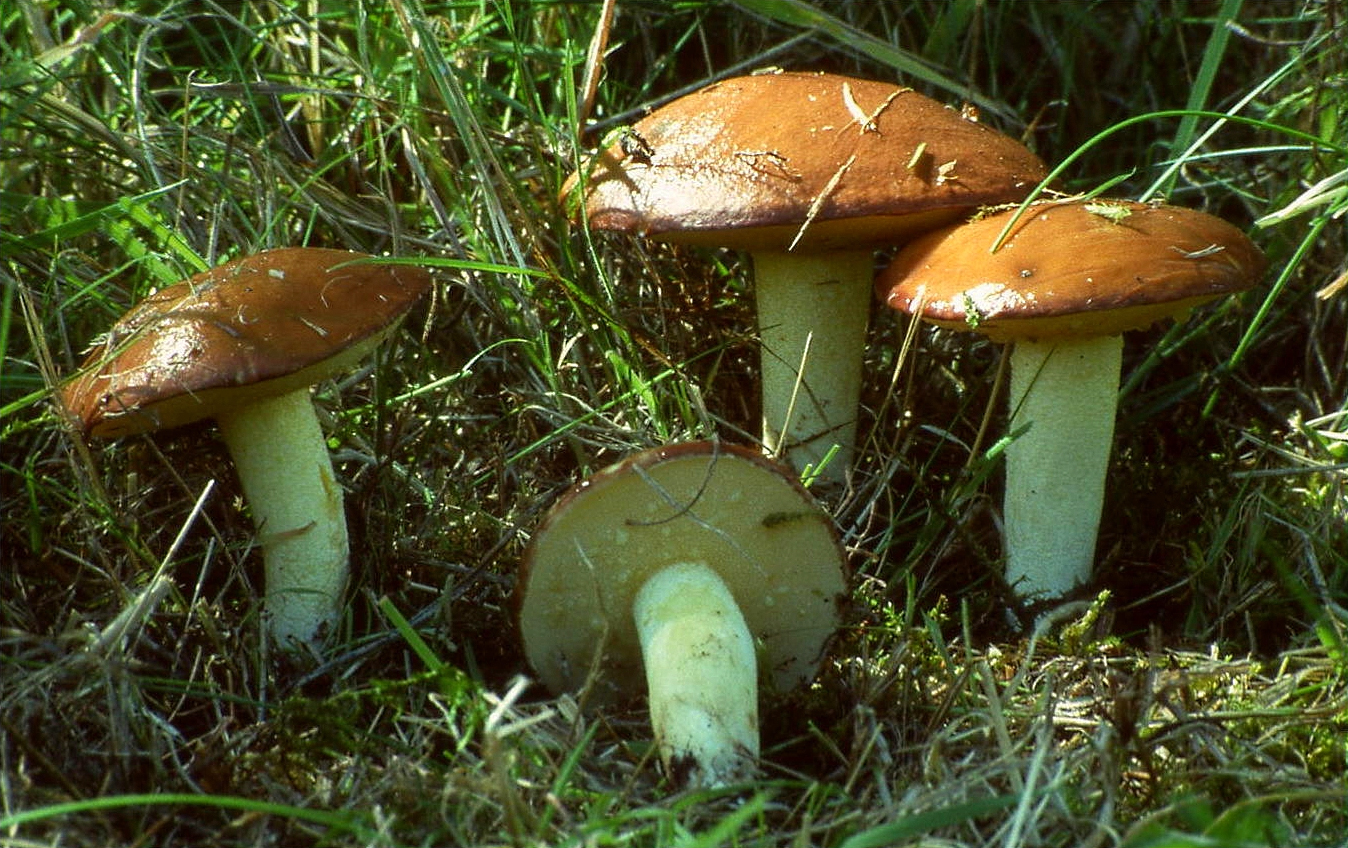
Suillus granulatus showing milky droplets on pores

The orange-brown, to brown-yellow cap is viscid (sticky) when wet, and shiny when dry, and is usually 4 to 12 centimetres (1 1/2 to 4 3/4 in) in diameter. The pale yellow stem is about 4–8 cm (1 1/2–3 1/4 in) tall 1–2 cm (3/8–3/4 in) wide, and of uniform thickness; it has tiny brownish granules at the apex and lacks a ring. The tubes and pores are small, pale yellow, and exude pale milky droplets when young. The flesh is also pale yellow.

=== Similar species ===
Suillus granulatus is often confused with S. luteus, which is another common and widely distributed species occurring in the same habitat. S. luteus has conspicuous a partial veil and ring, and lacks the milky droplets on the pores. Also similar is S. brevipes, which has a short stipe in relation to the cap, and which does not ooze droplets from the pore surface. S. pungens is also similar.

=== Bioleaching ===
Bioleaching is the industrial process of using living organisms to extract metals from ores, typically where there is only a trace amount of the metal to be extracted. It has been found that S. granulatus can extract trace elements (titanium, calcium, potassium, magnesium and lead) from wood ash and apatite.

== Habitat and distribution ==
Suillus granulatus grows with Pinus (pine trees) on both calcareous and acidic soils, and sometimes occurs in large numbers. It is the most widespread pine-associating Suillus species in warm climates.

The species is native to the Northern Hemisphere. It is associated with Japanese red pine (Pinus densiflora) in South Korea. It has been introduced to South Africa, Hawaii, Australia, New Zealand, Argentina, and Chile, and the Falkland Islands.

== Toxicity ==
Suillus granulatus sometimes causes contact dermatitis to those who handle it.

== Edibility ==
Suillus granulatus is edible but opinions vary on their quality. When preparing, the gelatinous pileipellis should be removed first, and like all Suillus species, the tubes are best removed before cooking. It has been reported to cause gastric distress in some cases. It is sometimes included in commercially produced mushroom preserves. The fruiting bodies—low in fat, high in fiber and carbohydrates, and a source of nutraceutical compounds—can be considered a functional food.
