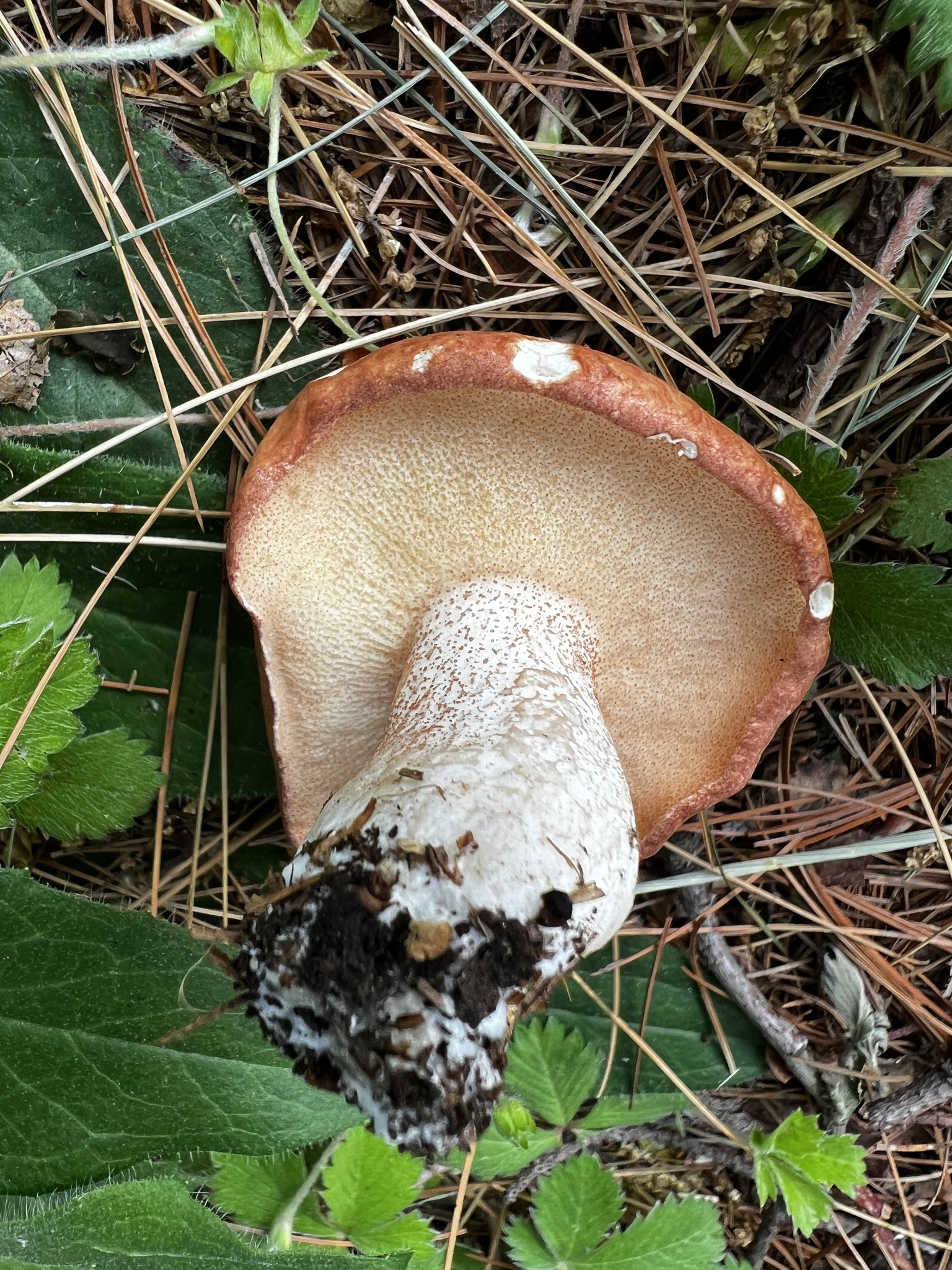

Scientific classification
- Kingdom: Fungi
- Division: Basidiomycota
- Class: Agaricomycetes
- Order: Boletales
- Family: Suillaceae
- Genus: Suillus
- Species: S. weaverae

Binomial name
- Suillus weaverae (A.H.Sm. & Shaffer) Kretzer & T.D.Bruns (1996)

Synonyms
- Fuscoboletinus weaverae A.H.Sm. & Shaffer (1965); Suillus granulatus auct. non (L.) Roussel (1796)

= Suillus weaverae =

Species of fungus

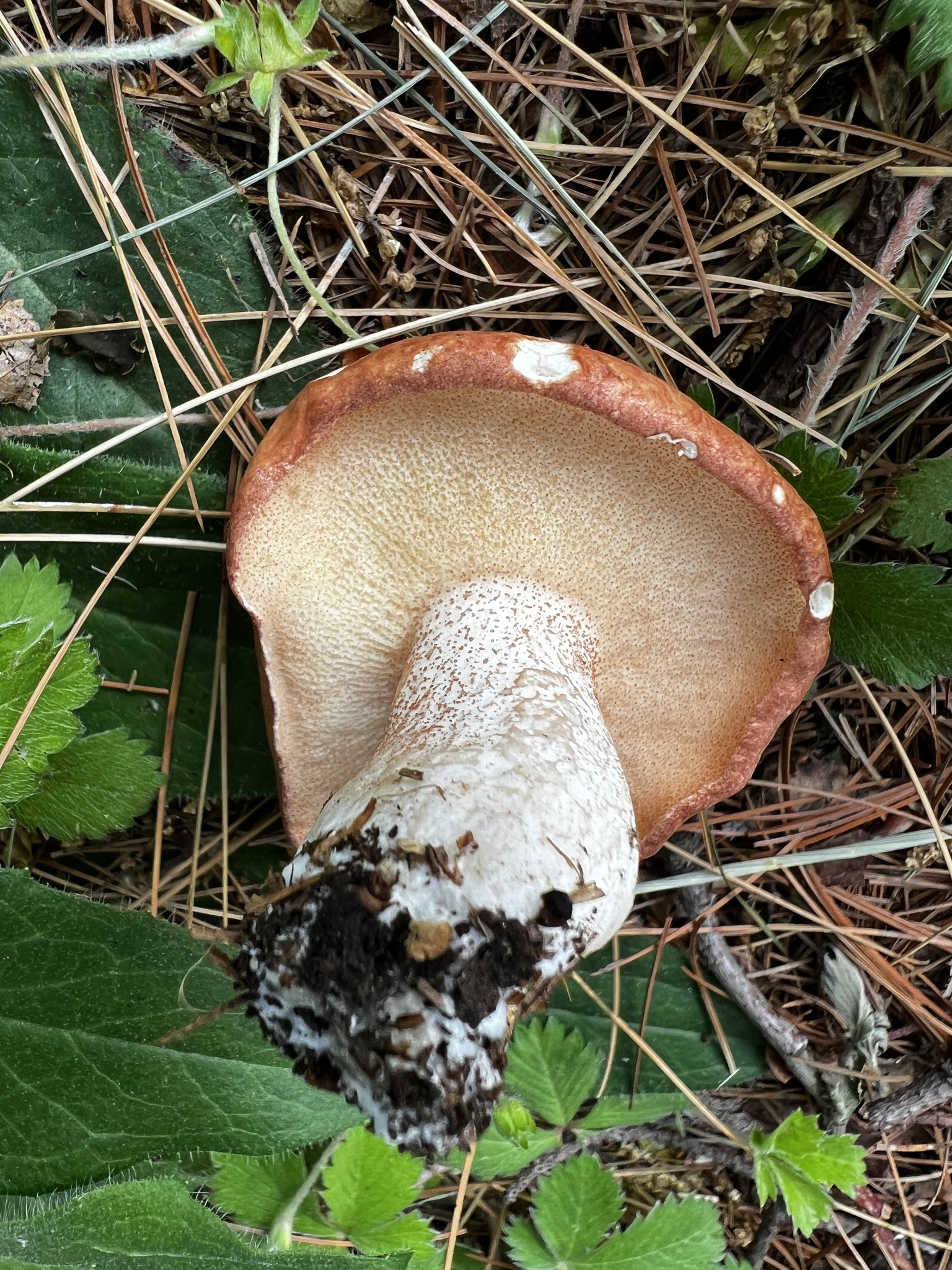
Suillus weaverae

Suillus weaverae (sometimes incorrectly referred to as Suillus granulatus in North America) is a bolete mushroom in the genus Suillus found in the United States and Canada. Previously thought to only exist in small numbers in Minnesota, Suillus weaverae has been rediscovered as a species wherever Suillus granulatus has been described in the Eastern United States.
