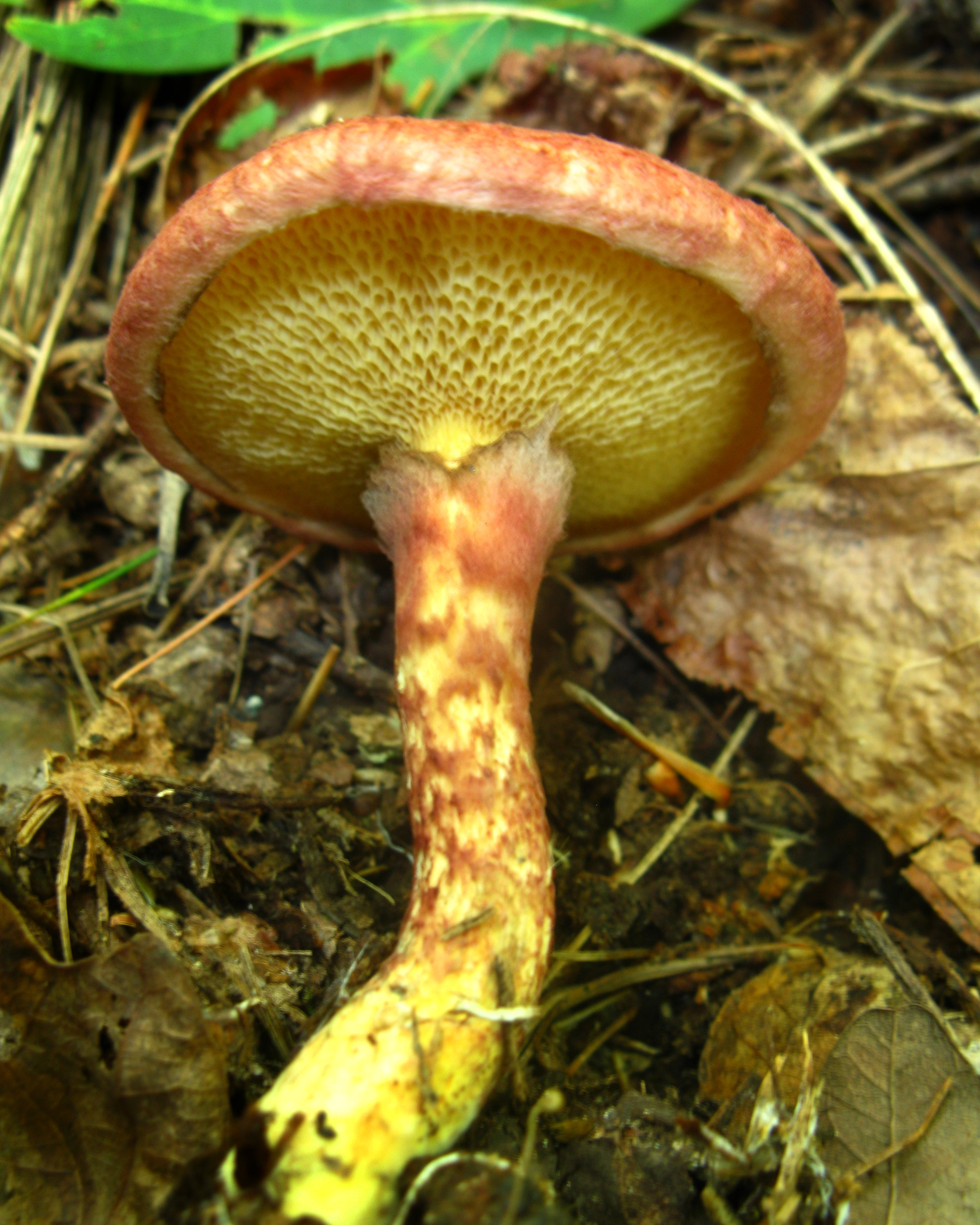
- Found in New Hampshire, US

Scientific classification
- Kingdom: Fungi
- Division: Basidiomycota
- Class: Agaricomycetes
- Order: Boletales
- Family: Suillaceae
- Genus: Suillus
- Species: S. spraguei

Binomial name
- Suillus spraguei (Berk. & M.A.Curtis) Kuntze

Synonyms
- Boletus murraii Berk. & M.A.Curtis, 1872; Boletus spraguei Berk. & M.A.Curtis, 1872; Boletus pictus Peck, 1873; Suillus pictus (Peck) Kuntze, 1898; Boletinus pictus (Peck) Lj.N.Vassiljeva, 1978

= Suillus spraguei =

Species of mushroom

Suillus spraguei
- Mycological characteristics
- Pores on hymenium
- Cap is convex
- Hymenium is decurrent
- Stipe has a ring
- Spore print is olive-brown
- Ecology is mycorrhizal
- Edibility is choice

Suillus spraguei is a species of fungus in the family Suillaceae. It is known by a variety of common names, including the painted slipperycap, the painted suillus or the red and yellow suillus. Suillus spraguei has had a complex taxonomical history and is also frequently referred to as Suillus pictus. The readily identifiable fruit bodies have caps that are dark red when fresh, dry to the touch, and covered with mats of hairs and scales that are separated by yellow cracks. On the underside of the cap are small, yellow, angular pores that become brownish as the mushroom ages. The stalk bears a grayish cottony ring and is typically covered with soft hairs or scales. The species bears a resemblance to several other members of Suillus, including S. decipiens, but can be differentiated by variations in color and size.

Suillus spraguei grows in a mycorrhizal association with several pine species, particularly eastern white pine, and the fruit bodies grow on the ground, appearing from early summer to autumn. It has a disjunct distribution, and is found in eastern Asia, northeastern North America, and Mexico throughout the range of the host tree. The mushroom is edible; opinions about its quality vary.

== Taxonomy ==
Suillus spraguei has a complex taxonomic history. The first specimen was originally collected in New England in 1856 by Charles James Sprague, and a formal scientific description was published in 1872 when Miles Joseph Berkeley and Moses Ashley Curtis called it Boletus spraguei. In a publication that appeared the following year, American mycologist Charles Horton Peck named the species Boletus pictus. Berkeley and Curtis had also described what they believed to be a new species—Boletus murraii—although this was later considered by Rolf Singer to be merely a younger version of their Boletus spraguei. Peck's description appeared in print in 1873, but the date stamp on the original publication revealed that he had sent his documents to the printer before the appearance of the 1872 Berkeley and Curtis publication, thus establishing nomenclatural priority under the rules of fungal naming. In 1945 Singer reported that the name Boletus pictus was illegitimate because it was a homonym, already being used for a polypore mushroom described by Carl Friedrich Schultz in 1806. (Note: According to Streinz (1862), Boletus pictus Schultz is probably the same species as Polyporus perennis (L.) Fr., currently known as Coltricia perennis.) The name was officially switched to Suillus spraguei in 1986 (Otto Kuntze had previously transferred the taxon to Suillus in 1898). (Note: Palm and Stewart consider Kuntze responsible for the transfer to Suillus; other authorities, including the taxonomic databases Index Fungorum and MycoBank, instead cite Smith and Thiers' 1964 monograph on North American species of Suillus.)

- - - - S. decipiens
      - S. spraguei
    - - S. granulatus
      - S. placidus
  - - - - - S. americanus
          - S. sibiricus
        - S. subumbonatus
      - - S. intermedius
        - S. subalutaceus
    - S. cothurnatus, S. subluteus, S. subaureus

Phylogeny and relationships of S. spraguei and related species based on ITS sequences

A 1996 molecular analysis of 38 Suillus species used the sequences of their internal transcribed spacers to infer phylogenetic relationships and clarify the taxonomy of the genus. The results indicate that S. spraguei is most closely related to S. decipiens. The species S. granulatus and S. placidus lie on a branch sister to that containing S. spraguei. These results were corroborated and extended in later publications that assessed the relationships between Asian and eastern North American isolates of various Suillus, including S. spraguei. The analysis supported the hypothesis that S. spraguei and S. decipiens in China and the United States were each other's closest relatives, and the clade that contained them could be divided into four distinct subgroups: S. decipiens, U.S. S. spraguei, China (Yunnan) S. spraguei, and China (Jilin) S. spraguei.

The specific epithet spraguei is an homage to the collector Sprague, while pictus means "painted" or "colored". Suillus spraguei is commonly known as the "painted slipperycap", the "painted suillus", or the "red and yellow suillus". It is also called the "eastern painted Suillus" to contrast with the "western painted Suillus" (Suillus lakei).

== Description ==
The cap of the fruit body is 3 to 12 cm (1 1/4 to 4 3/4 in) in diameter, and depending on its age, is either conic to convex, to somewhat flattened at maturity. The cap margin is initially rolled downward before straightening out, often with hanging remnants of partial veil (appendiculate). The cap surface is covered with densely matted filaments that are rough and scale-like. The scales are pink to brownish red, fading to a pale brown-gray or dull yellow in maturity. Under the scales, the cap surface is yellow to pale yellow-orange. While many other Suillus species have a sticky or slimy cap, S. spraguei is dry. The flesh is yellow.

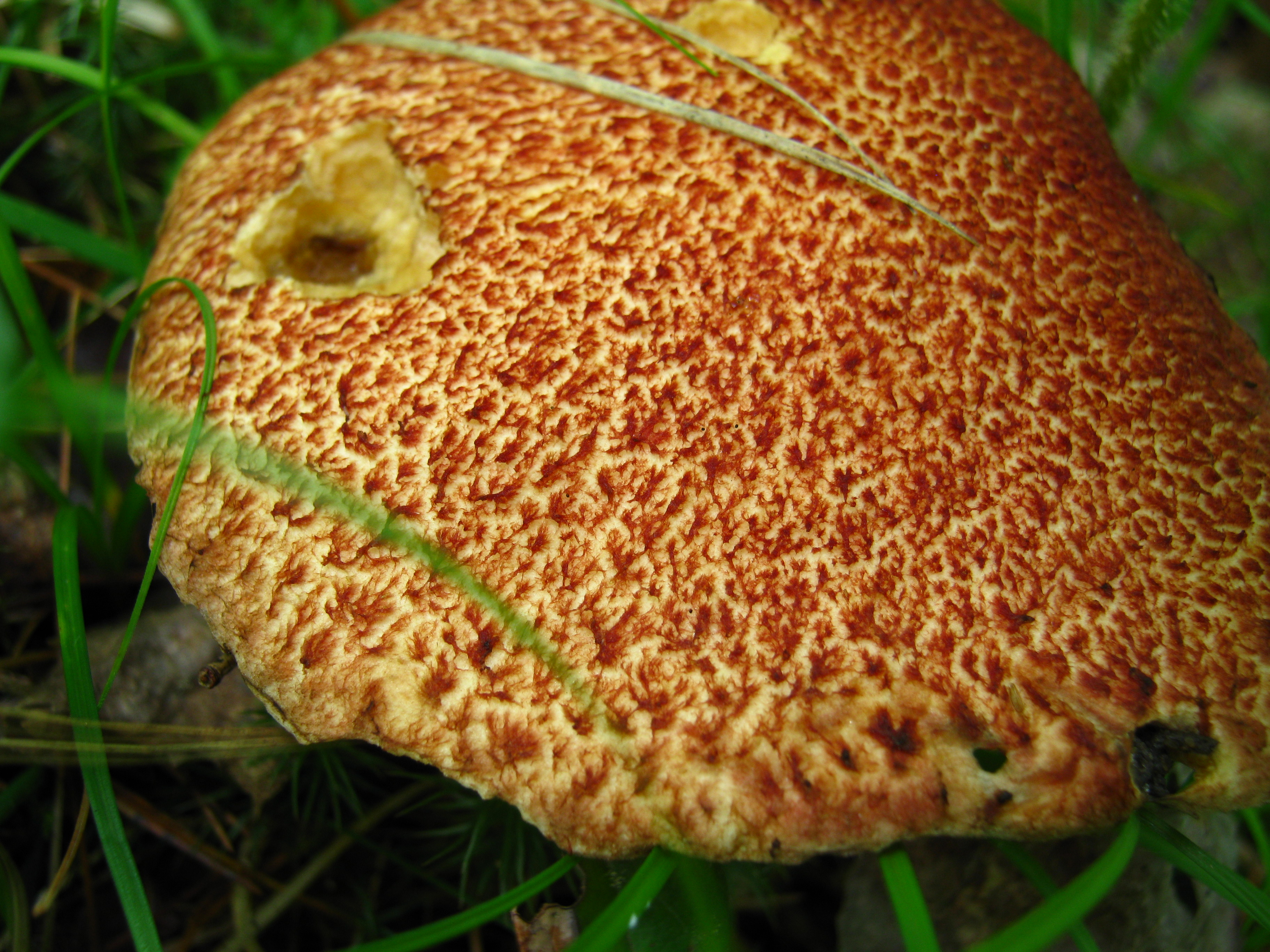
The cap surface has scales or mats of reddish hairs; in this older specimen the scales have separated somewhat, exposing more yellow flesh underneath.

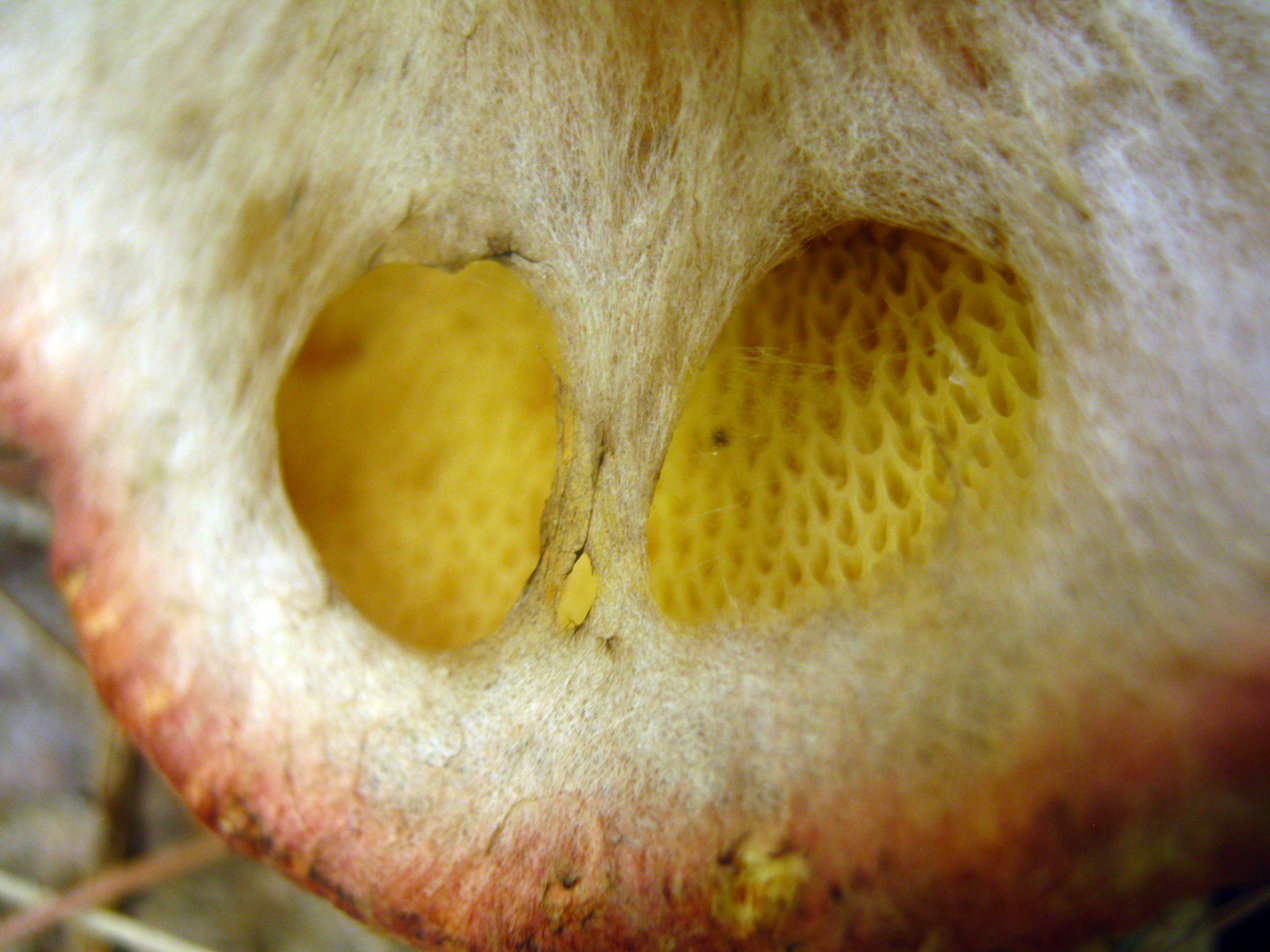
The partial veil is beginning to tear, exposing the pore surface.

The pores on the underside of the cap are yellowish and angular, measuring 0.5 to 5 mm (1/32 to 3/16 in) wide, and formed by tubes that extend 4 to 8 mm (1/8 to 3/8 in) deep. These pores have a slightly decurrent attachment to the stem (extending down its length). Young specimens have a whitish fibrous partial veil that protects the developing pores; as the cap expands it rips the veil, which remains as a grayish ring on the stem. The stem is 4 to 12 cm (1 5/8 to 4 3/4 in) long, and 1 to 2.5 cm (3/8 to 1 in) thick, roughly cylindrical in shape, or sometimes with a bulbous bottom so as to be somewhat club-shaped. The stem surface is tomentose, with scales at the top, and a ring on the upper half of the stem. Below the ring the stem is fibrillose, covered with a mat of soft hairs. Its color at the top is yellow, but with wine-red to reddish-brown scales below, underlaid with a pale yellow to grayish color. The stem is usually solid, rarely hollow. The tissue of all parts of the fruit body—cap, pores, and stem—will turn brownish shortly after being bruised or injured.

In deposit, such as with a spore print, the spores of S. spraguei appear olive-brown in color; this changes to clay or tawny-olive after drying. Microscopically, the spores have smooth surfaces, measuring 9–11 by 3–4.5 μm; in side profile they have asymmetrical sides and a suprahilar depression (a surface indentation formed where the spore attaches to the basidia), while in face view they appear oblong. The spores are not amyloid, meaning that they do not absorb iodine when stained with Melzer's reagent. The basidia (the spore-bearing cells in the hymenium) are thin-walled, four-spored, and have dimensions of 17–19 by 5–7.8 μm. In the presence of potassium hydroxide, they appear hyaline (translucent), and they become pale yellow to nearly hyaline in Melzer's reagent.

Various parts of the mushroom display characteristic color reactions to chemical tests commonly used in mushroom identification. The cap cuticle will turn a blackish color with the application of a drop of potassium hydroxide (KOH), iron sulfate (FeSO_{4}) solution, or ammonia solution. The mushroom flesh turns grayish-green to greenish black with a drop of FeSO_{4}, and olive to greenish black with KOH or NH_{4}OH.

=== Similar species ===
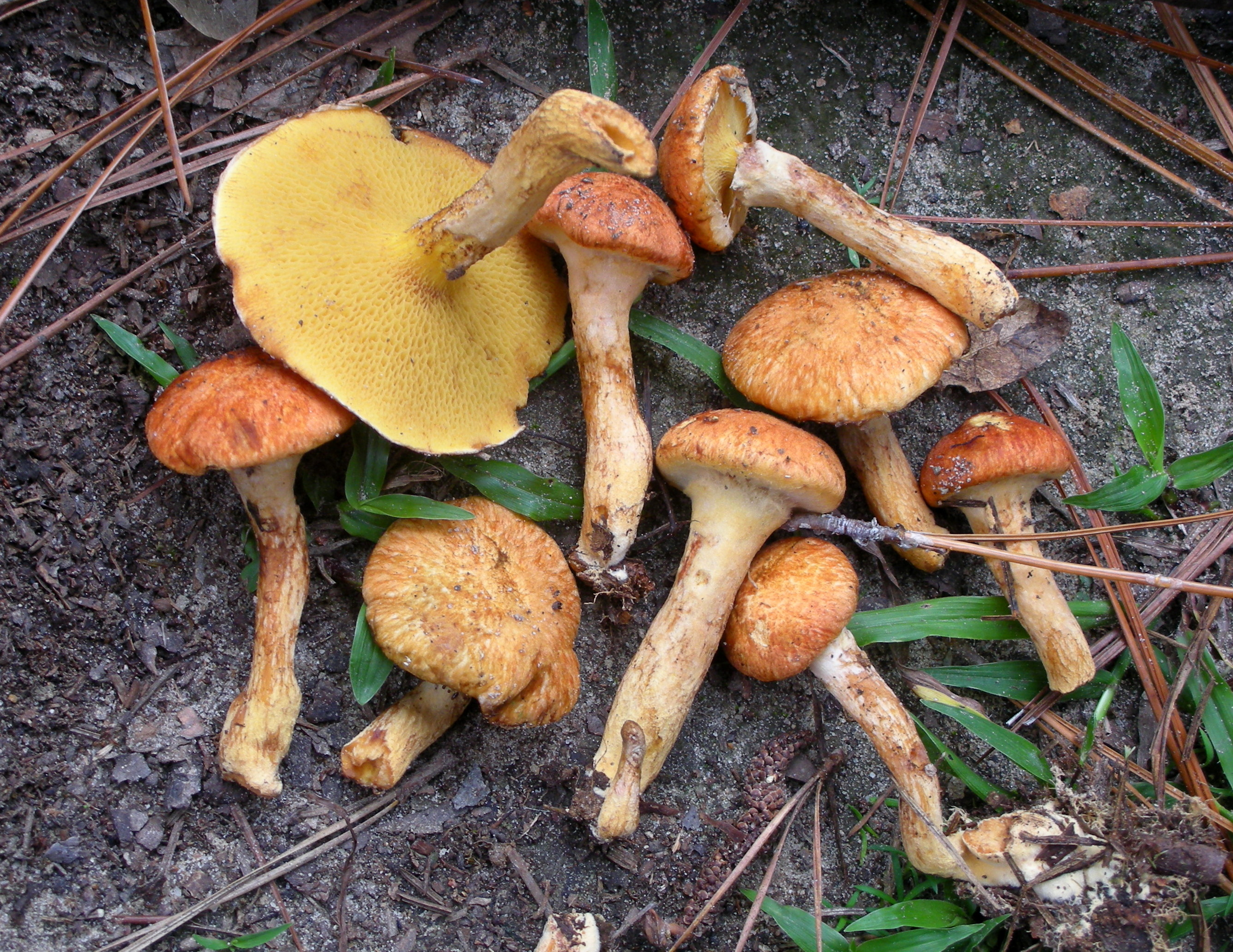
Suillus decipiens is a lookalike.

S. spraguei is a popular edible among novice mushroom hunters as it is readily identifiable due to both its appearance and its association with white pine. This renders it unlikely to be confused with other species, but it shares similar characteristics with several other Suillus species. S. spraguei bears some resemblance to the rosy larch bolete (S. ochraceoroseus), but the latter species has a darker spore print, a thicker stem, and grows in association with larch. S. cavipes, another associate of larch trees, is more brownish and has a hollow stalk. S. lakei is less brightly colored than S. spraguei, has a shorter stalk, and usually grows with Douglas-fir. S. decipiens has a less intensely red cap when young, but the color of older specimens fade and can resemble S. spraguei. S. decipiens generally has a smaller stature, with a cap ranging from 4 to 7 cm (1 1/2 to 2 3/4 in) in diameter, and stem that is typically 4–7 cm (1 1/2–2 3/4 in) long by 0.7–1.6 cm (1/4–5/8 in) thick. Further, its pores are irregular in shape, measuring 0.5–1 mm in diameter at maturity, and stain a shade of hazel rather than reddish to brownish. It is found in the southeastern U.S., from New Jersey south to Florida and west to Texas.

== Ecology, habitat and distribution ==
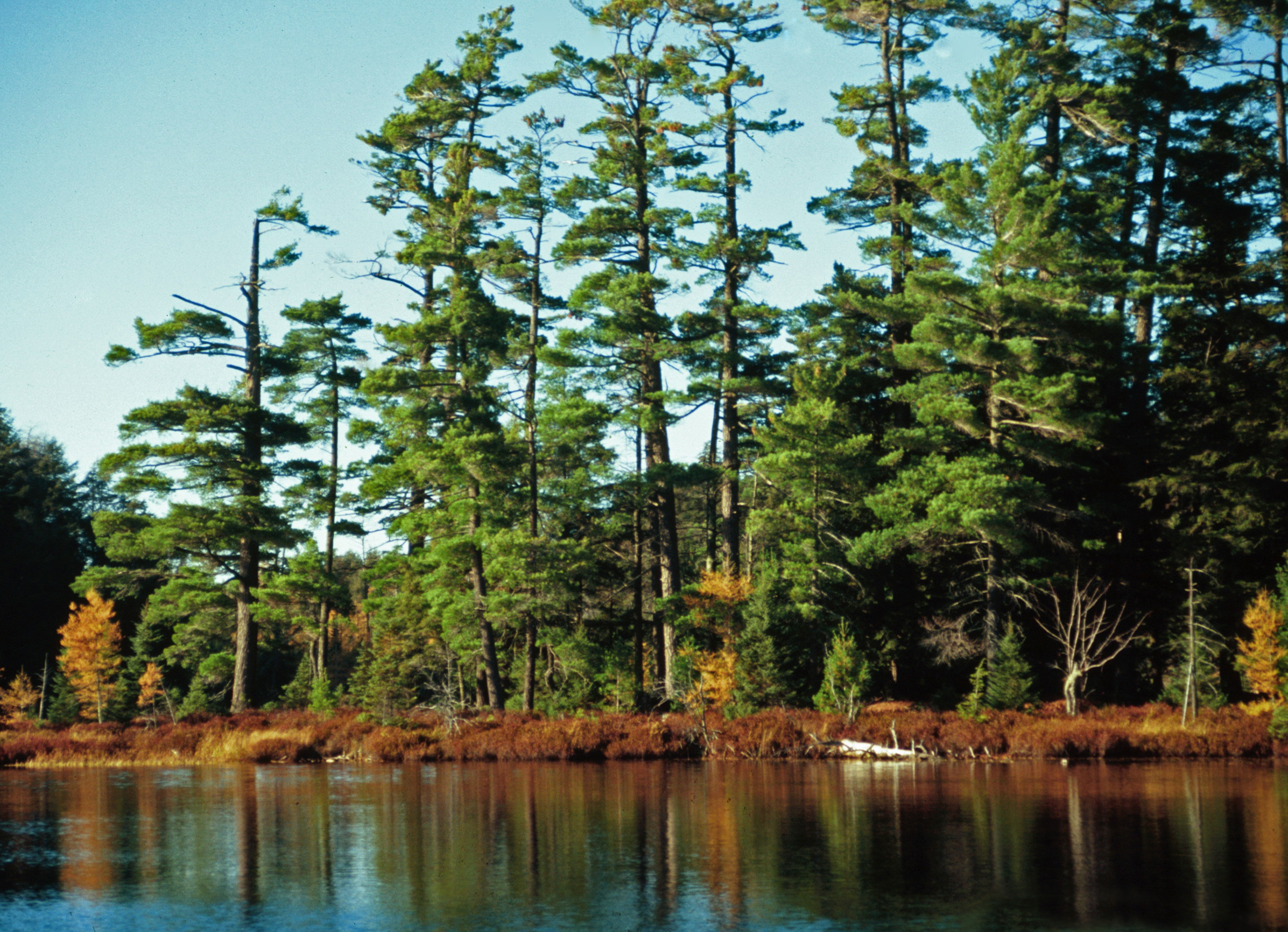
Pinus strobus (eastern white pine) is the predominant North American mycorrhizal associate of S. spraguei.

In nature, S. spraguei forms ectomycorrhizal relationships with five-needled pine species. This is a mutually beneficial relationship where the hyphae of the fungus grow around the roots of the trees, enabling the fungus to receive moisture, protection and nutritive byproducts of the tree, and affording the tree greater access to soil nutrients. S. spraguei produces tuberculate ectomycorrhizae (covered with wart-like projections) that are described as aggregates of ectomycorrhizal roots encased in a fungal rind, and rhizomorphs that are tubular fungal cords with a hard outer sheath. The fungus has ecological host specificity, and in natural soils can only associate with white pine, a grouping of trees classified in subgenus Strobus of the genus Pinus. Under controlled pure culture conditions in the laboratory, S. spraguei has also been shown to form associations with red pine, pitch pine, and loblolly pine. Asian populations have been associated with Korean pine, Chinese white pine, Siberian dwarf pine and Japanese white pine.

In North America, the fruit bodies appear as early as June, earlier than most other boletes (which generally begin to appear July–September), but they may be found as late as October. The mushrooms can be parasitized by the fungus Hypomyces completus. In the asexual stage of H. completus, it appears initially as patches of whitish mold on the surface of the cap or stem that rapidly spread to cover the entire mushroom surface and produce conidia (asexual spores). In the sexual stage, the mold changes color, progressing from yellow-brown to brown, greenish-brown and eventually black as it makes perithecia, asci-containing sexual structures that produce ascospores. The perithecia are pimply and give the surface a roughened texture.

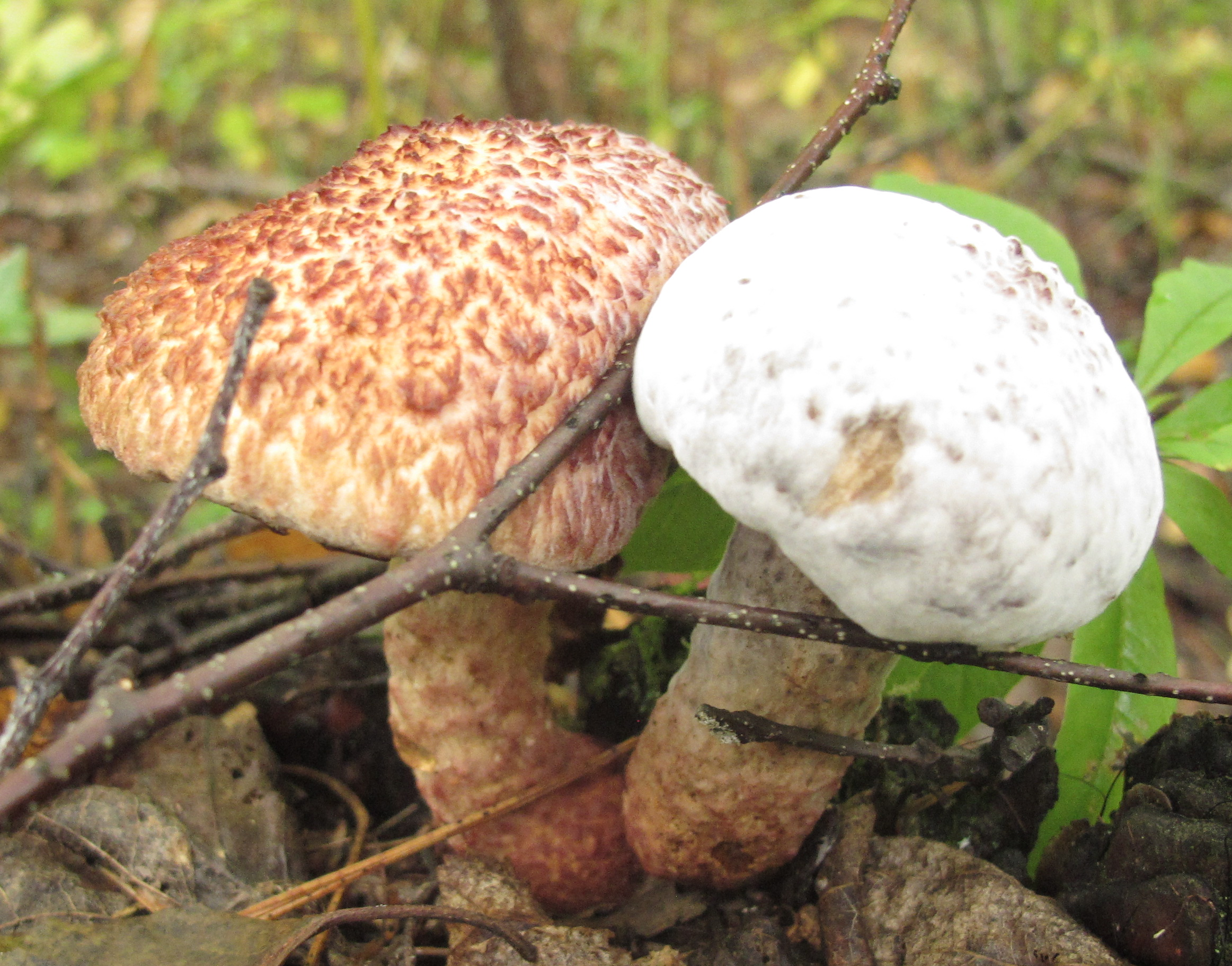
The S. spraguei fruit body on the right is being attacked by the bolete mold Hypomyces completus.

A Japanese field study found that S. spraguei was the dominant fungus in a 21-year-old stand of Korean pine, both in terms of ectomycorrhizae (measured as percentage of biomass present in soil samples) and by fruit body production (comprising over 90% of dry weight of total fruit bodies collected of all species). The production of S. spraguei fruit bodies averaged about one per square meter, without much variance during the four-year study period. The mushrooms appeared mostly from August to November, tended to grow in clumps, and the spatial distribution of clumps was random—the location of the clumps was not correlatable with appearances in previous years. The density of mushrooms along a forest road was higher than average, suggesting a preference for disturbed habitat. The results also suggested that S. spraguei prefers to produce fruit bodies in areas with low litter accumulation, a finding corroborated in a later publication. This study also determined that the fungus propagates mainly by vegetative growth (extension of underground mycelia), rather than by colonization of spores.

Suillus spraguei has a disjunct distribution and is known from several localities in Asia, including China, Japan, Korea, and Taiwan. In North America, its range extends from eastern Canada (Nova Scotia) south to the Carolinas, and west to Minnesota. It has also been collected in Mexico (Coahuila and Durango). Furthermore, the species has been introduced to Europe (Germany, Lower Saxony; Netherlands).

== Uses ==
Suillus spraguei is an edible mushroom. Its taste is not distinctive, and the odor has been described as "slightly fruity". It turns a blackish color when cooked, and some consider it choice, and "among the better edibles in the genus Suillus". In contrast, another source on mushrooms of Québec described the mushroom as a poor edible ("comestible médiocre"), and warned of a slightly acidic taste and disagreeable flavor. Michael Kuo's 2007 book 100 Edible Mushrooms rates the taste as mediocre, suggesting "its sluglike consistency has all the palatability of unflavored gelatin." The book recommends frying the thinly sliced mushroom in butter or oil until it acquires a crispy texture.

== See also ==
- List of North American boletes
