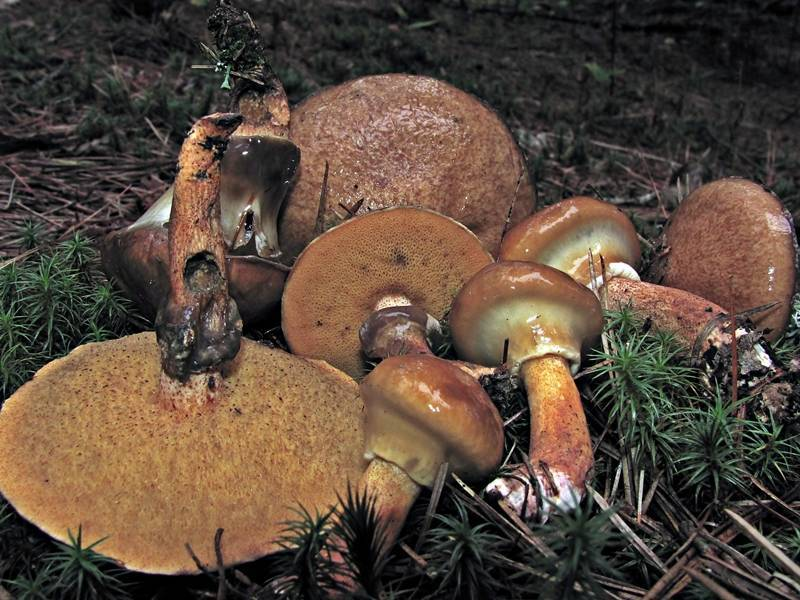

Scientific classification
- Kingdom: Fungi
- Division: Basidiomycota
- Class: Agaricomycetes
- Order: Boletales
- Family: Suillaceae
- Genus: Suillus
- Species: S. salmonicolor

Binomial name
- Suillus salmonicolor (Frost) Halling (1983)

Synonyms
- Boletus salmonicolor Frost (1874); Boletus subluteus Peck (1887); Ixocomus subluteus (Peck) E.-J.Gilbert (1931); Suillus subluteus (Peck) Snell (1944); Suillus cothurnatus Singer (1945); Boletus luteus var. cothurnatus (Singer) Murrill (1948); Suillus pinorigidus Snell & Dick (1956)

= Suillus salmonicolor =

Species of fungus in the family Suillaceae

Suillus salmonicolor
- Mycological characteristics
- Pores on hymenium
- Cap is convex or flat
- Hymenium is adnate or decurrent
- Stipe is bare
- Spore print is brown
- Ecology is mycorrhizal
- Edibility is edible

Suillus salmonicolor, commonly known as the Slippery Jill, is a fungus in the family Suillaceae of the order Boletales. First described as a member of the genus Boletus in 1874, the species acquired several synonyms, including Suillus pinorigidus and Suillus subluteus, before it was assigned its current binomial name in 1983. It has not been determined with certainty whether S. salmonicolor is distinct from the species S. cothurnatus, described by Rolf Singer in 1945.

The mushroom's dingy yellow to brownish cap is rounded to flattened in shape, slimy when wet, and grows up to 8 cm (3 in) wide. The small pores on the underside of the cap are yellow before becoming olive-brown. The stem is up to 10 cm (4 in) long and 1.6 cm (3/4 in) thick and is covered with reddish-brown glandular dots. Young specimens are covered with a grayish, slimy partial veil that later ruptures and leaves a sheathlike ring on the stem. Other similar Suillus species include S. acidus, S. subalutaceus, and S. intermedius.

S. salmonicolor is a mycorrhizal fungus—meaning it forms a symbiotic association with the roots of plants such that both organisms benefit from the exchange of nutrients. This symbiosis occurs with various species of pine, and the fruit bodies (or mushrooms) of the fungus appear scattered or in groups on the ground near the trees. The fungus is found in North America, Hawaii, Asia, the Caribbean, South Africa, Australia and Central America. It has been introduced to several of those locations via transplanted trees. Although the mushroom is generally considered edible—especially if the slimy cap cuticle and partial veil are first peeled off—opinions about flavor vary.

== Taxonomy ==
The species was first described scientifically by American mycologist Charles Christopher Frost in 1874 as Boletus salmonicolor, based on specimens he collected in the New England area of the United States. In a 1983 publication, mycologist Roy Halling declared Boletus subluteus (described by Charles Horton Peck in 1887; Ixocomus subluteus is a later combination based on this name) and Suillus pinorigidus (described by Wally Snell and Esther A. Dick in 1956) to be synonymous. Halling also reexamined Frost's type specimen of B. salmonicolor, and considered the taxon better placed in Suillus because of its glutinous cap, dotted stem, and ring; he formally transferred it to that genus, resulting in the combination Suillus salmonicolor. The specific epithet salmonicolor is a Latin color term meaning "pink with a dash of yellow". The mushroom is commonly known as the "slippery Jill".

- - - - - S. americanus
        - S. sibiricus
      - S. umbonatus
    - - S. intermedius
      - S. subalutaceus
  - - - S. cothurnatus
      - S. salmonicolor
    - S. subaureus

Phylogenetic relationships of S. salmonicolor (as S. subluteus) and related species based on ITS sequences.

In a 1986 publication on Suillus taxonomy and nomenclature, Mary E. Palm and Elwin L. Stewart further discussed the synonymy of S. salmonicolor, S. subluteus, and S. pinorigidus. They noted that fruit bodies of S. subluteus collected in Minnesota did not have the strong salmon colors considered characteristic of S. salmonicolor, as well as collections that had been named S. pinorigidus; this is a morphological difference that could be sufficient to consider S. subluteus a distinct species. They explained that although the microscopic characteristics of the three taxa do not differ significantly, this is not unusual for Suillus and cannot be used as the sole proof of conspecificity. Palm and Stewart concluded that a study of specimens from various areas of their geographical ranges would be needed to fully resolve the taxonomy of these related species.

There is some disagreement in the literature about whether Suillus cothurnatus represents a different species from S. salmonicolor. The online mycological taxonomy database MycoBank lists them as synonyms, contrary to Index Fungorum. In their 2000 monograph of North American boletes, Alan Bessette and colleagues list the two taxa separately, noting that the range of S. cothurnatus is difficult to determine because of confusion with S. salmonicolor. In a molecular analyses of Suillus phylogeny, based on the internal transcribed spacer, S. salmonicolor (as S. subluteus) and S. intermedius clustered together very closely, indicating a high degree of genetic similarity. These analyses were based on comparing the sequence differences in a single region of ribosomal DNA; more recent molecular analyses typically combine the analysis of several genes to increase the validity of inferences drawn.

== Description ==
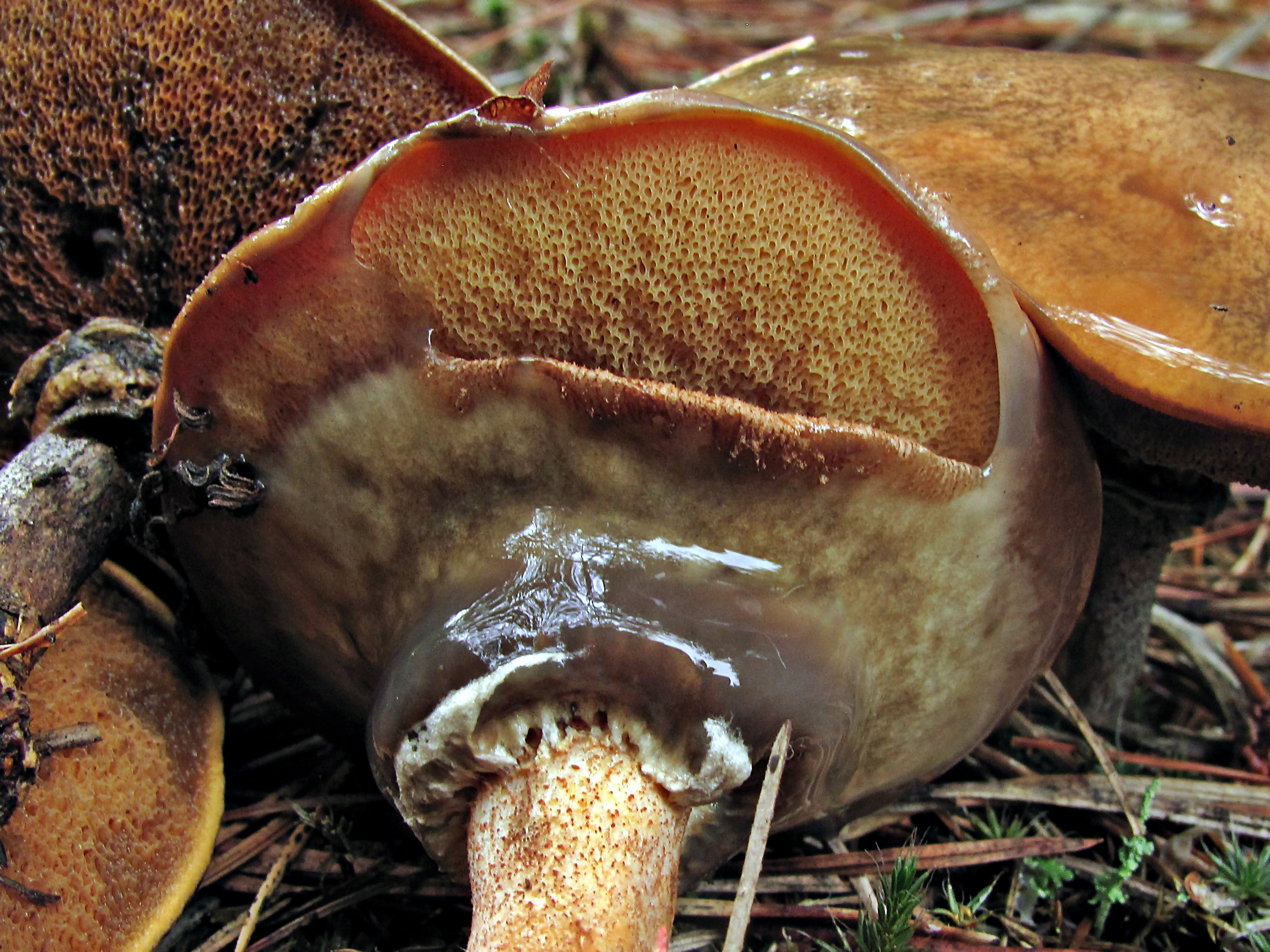
The orange flesh and booted slimy veil are distinctive characteristics of the mushroom.

The cap of S. salmonicolor is bluntly rounded or convex to nearly flattened, reaching a diameter of 3–8 cm (1–3 in). The cap surface is sticky to slimy when moist, but becomes shiny when dry. The cap color is variable, ranging from dingy yellow to yellowish-orange to ochraceous-salmon, cinnamon-brown or olive-brown to yellow-brown. The flesh is pale orange-yellow to orange-buff or orange, and does not stain when exposed to air. The odor and taste are not distinctive. The pore surface on the underside of the cap is yellow to dingy yellow, or yellowish orange to salmon, darkening to brownish with age; it also does not stain when bruised. The pores are circular to angular and 8–10 mm (5/16–3/8 in) deep, with 1–2 found per mm.

The stem is 2.5–10 cm (1–4 in) long, 6–16 mm (1/4–5/8 in) thick, and either equal in width throughout or slightly enlarged in the lower portion. It is whitish to yellowish or pinkish-ochre, and has reddish-brown to dark brown glandular dots and smears on the surface. Glandular dots are made of clumps of pigmented cells, and, unlike reticulation or scabers (small visible tufts of fibers that occur on the stems of other Suillus species), can be rubbed off with handling. The flesh is ochraceous to yellowish, often salmon-orange at the base of the stem. The partial veil that protects the developing gills is initially thick, baggy, and rubbery. It often has a conspicuously thickened cottony roll of tissue at its base, and sometimes flares outward from the stem on the lower portion. It forms a gelatinous ring on the upper to middle part of the stem. The spore print is cinnamon-brown to brown. The surface of the cap, when applied with a drop of dilute potassium hydroxide (KOH) or ammonia solution (chemical reagents commonly used for mushroom identification), will first turn a fleeting pink color, then dark red as the flesh collapses.

The spores are smooth, roughly ellipsoid in shape, inequilateral when viewed in profile, and measure 7.6–10 by 3–3.4 μm. They appear hyaline (translucent) to yellowish in a dilute solution of KOH, and cinnamon to pale ochraceous when stained with Melzer's reagent. The basidia are somewhat collapsed, hyaline, and 5–6 μm thick. The cystidia are scattered, sometimes arranged in clusters (especially on the gill edge), usually with an ochraceous-brown content, but occasionally hyaline. They are club-shaped to somewhat cylindric and measure 34–60 by 10–13 μm. The cuticle of the cap is an ixotrichodermium—a cellular arrangement where the outermost hyphae are gelatinous and emerge roughly parallel, like hairs, perpendicular to the cap surface. These hyphae are hyaline and narrowly cylindric, measuring 1.4–3 μm in diameter. The stem surface is made of scattered bundles of caulocystidia (cystidia on the stem) that are brown or sometimes hyaline in KOH, club-shaped to subcylindrical bundles interspersed among hyaline cells. These bundles are underlain by a layer of gelatinous, hyaline, vertically oriented and parallel hyphae that are shaped like narrow cylinders. Clamp connections are absent from the hyphae.

=== Similar species ===
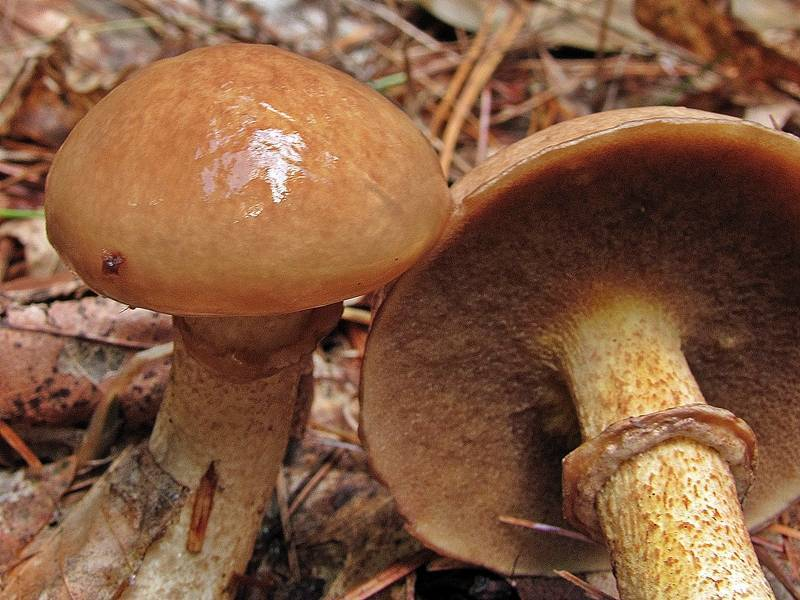
Suillus acidus

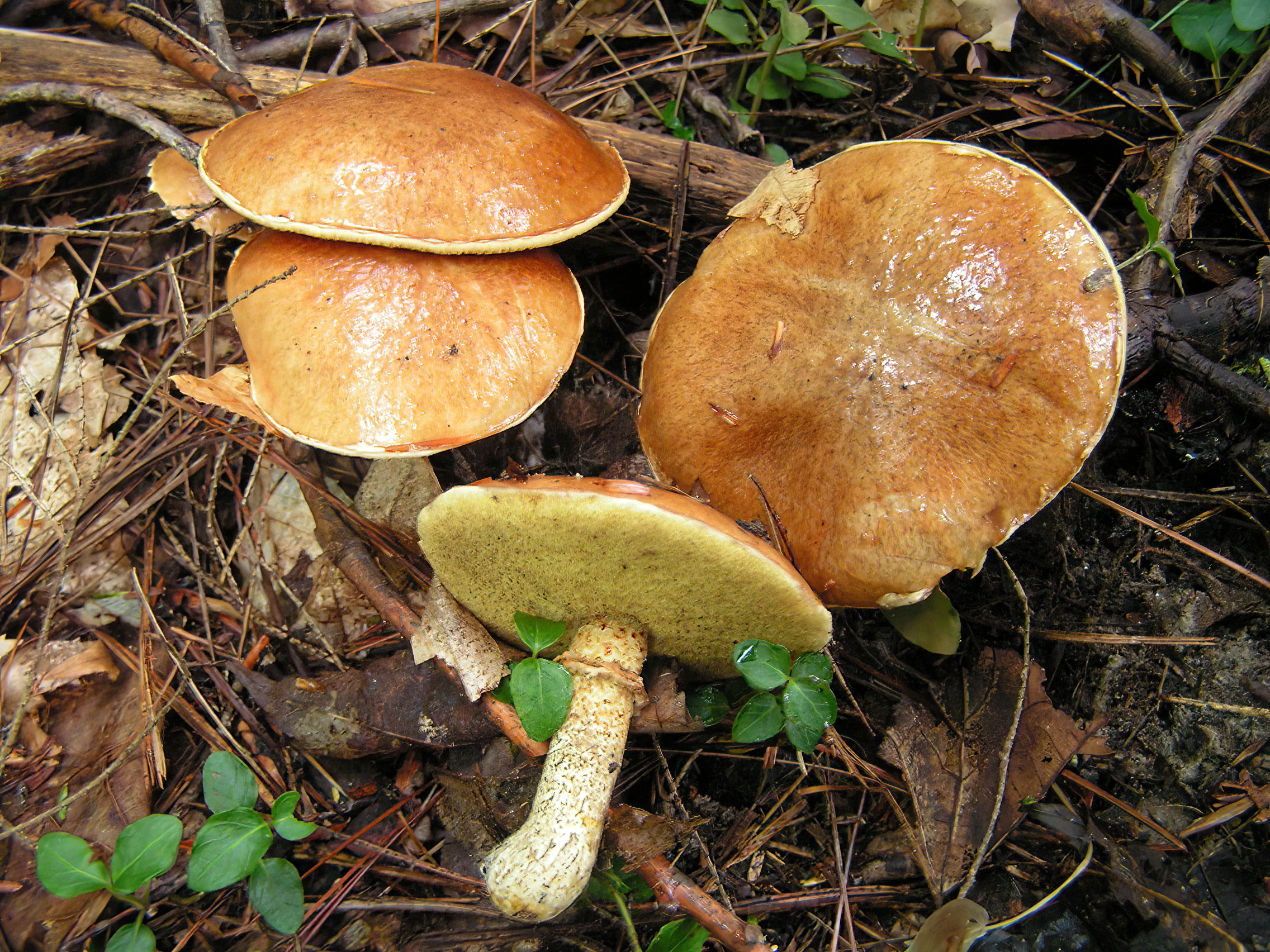
Suillus intermedius

Suillus intermedius, found in northeastern and northern North America, is similar in appearance to S. salmonicolor. It may be distinguished by a lighter-colored cap, cream to yellowish or pale ochraceous flesh, and a ring that is neither as thick nor as wide as S. salmonicolor. It is also larger, with a cap diameter of up to 16 cm (6.3 in), and its pore surface sometimes slowly stains reddish-brown when bruised. Although it has not been definitively established whether S. cothurnatus is a distinct species, several characteristics have been reported to differentiate it from S. salmonicolor: a thinner, less rubbery veil that usually lacks a thickened cottony roll at the base; glandular dots on the stem that consist of bundles of multiseptate hyphae in a parallel arrangement ending in an even row of large, sterile cystidia (60–140 μm long) that resemble basidia; and small hyaline cystidia shaped like swollen bottles with narrowed bases. Other Suillus species with which S. salmonicolor might be confused include S. acidus and S. subalutaceus. Both of these species have a less well-developed partial veil, and their flesh is a duller tone lacking yellow-orange tints.

== Ecology, habitat and distribution ==
Suillus salmonicolor occurs in a mycorrhizal association with various species of Pinus. This is a mutualistic relationship in which the subterranean fungal mycelia creates a protective sheath around the rootlets of the tree and a network of hyphae (the Hartig net) that penetrates between the tree's epidermal and cortical cells. This association helps the plant absorb water and mineral nutrients; in exchange, the fungus receives a supply of carbohydrates produced by the plant's photosynthesis. Two-, three-, and five-needled pines have all been recorded to associate with S. salmonicolor. In North America, where it fruits from August to October, the fungus has been found growing with P. banksiana, P. palustris, P. resinosa, P. rigida, P. strobus and P. taeda. In Kamchatka (in the Russian Far East) it has been found in association with P. pumila, in the Philippines with P. kesiya, and in southern India with P. patula. The northern limit of its North American range is eastern Canada (Quebec), and the southern limit is Nuevo León and near Nabogame in Temósachi Municipality, Chihuahua, Mexico.

Suillus salmonicolor has been collected from the Dominican Republic in the Caribbean, Japan, Taiwan, and from Mpumalanga, South Africa. Because there are no native Pinus species in South Africa, the fungus is assumed to be an exotic species that has been introduced via pine plantations. It has also been introduced to Australia, where it is known from a single collection made in a plantation of Caribbean pine (Pinus caribaea) in Queensland, and has been found growing with Caribbean pine in Belize. It is found in Hawaii under slash pine (Pinus elliotii), including lawns where those trees are used in landscaping. S. salmonicolor is one of several ectomycorrhizal species that have "traveled the thousands of kilometers from a mainland to Hawaii in the roots and soil of introduced seedlings."

== Edibility ==
The mushroom is edible, but removal of the slimy cap cuticle and partial veil before thoroughly cooking is recommended to avoid possible gastroenteritis; similarly, the 1992 field guide Edible Wild Mushrooms of North America recommends the removal of the tube layer before preparation, as it can become slimy during cooking. Opinions about the quality of the mushroom vary. According to the book Boletes of North America, it is "very good" with a "lemony" flavor. A Canadian field guide is more cautious in its assessment, and suggests that one would have to be brave to consume a mushroom with such a sticky veil. Mycologist David Arora, in his Mushrooms Demystified, opines that it is not worth eating. The mushroom serves as a habitat for larvae of mycophagous insects such as the muscid fly Mydaea discimana and the scuttle fly Megaselia lutea.

== See also ==
- List of North American boletes
