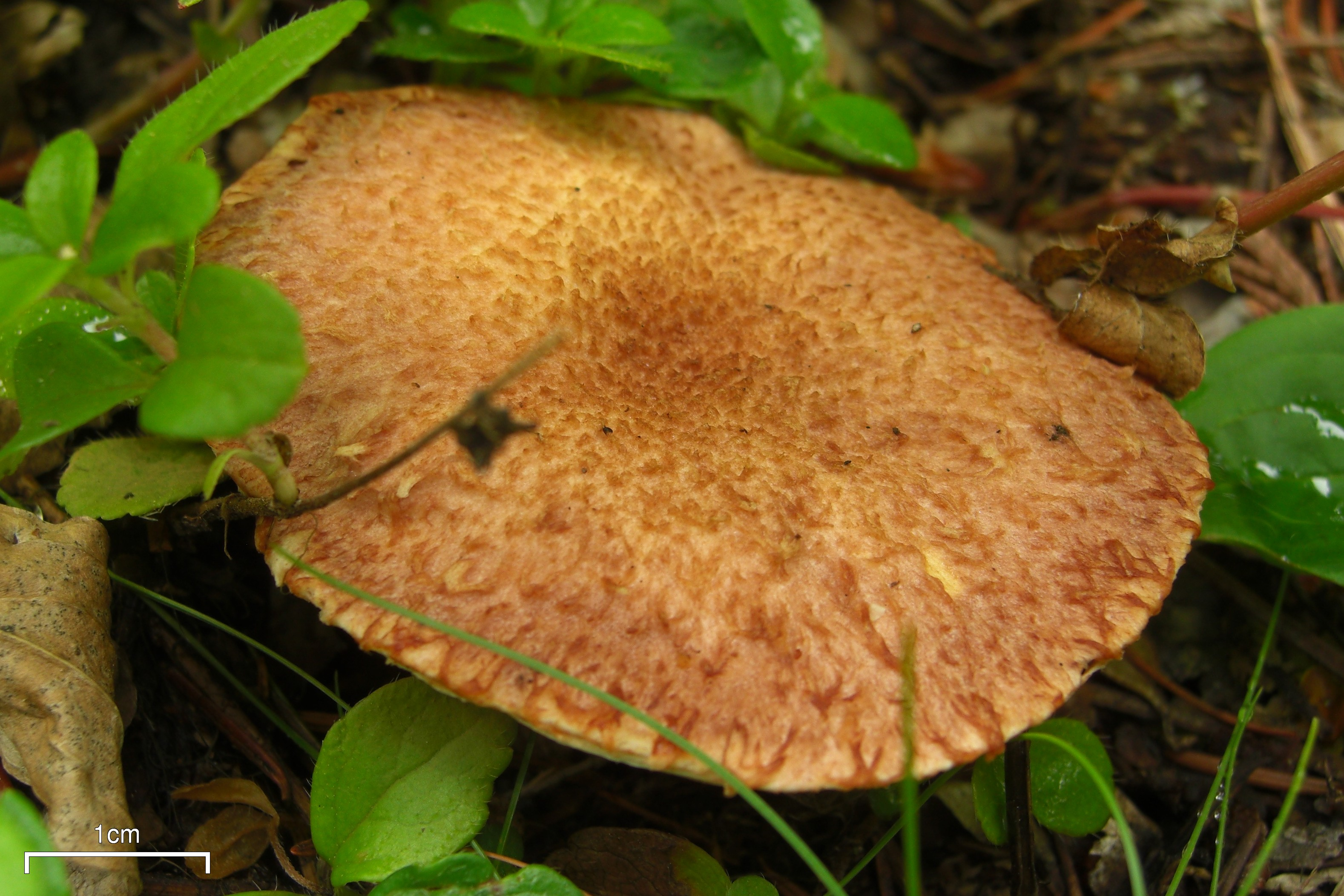

Conservation status
- Least Concern (IUCN 3.1)

Scientific classification
- Kingdom: Fungi
- Division: Basidiomycota
- Class: Agaricomycetes
- Order: Boletales
- Family: Suillaceae
- Genus: Suillus
- Species: S. lakei

Binomial name
- Suillus lakei (Murrill) A.H.Sm. & Thiers (1964)

Synonyms
- Boletus lakei Murrill (1912); Ixocomus lakei (Murrill) Singer (1940); Boletinus lakei (Murrill) Singer (1945)

= Suillus lakei =

Species of fungus

Suillus lakei Mycological characteristics
- Pores on hymenium
- Cap is convex or flat
- Hymenium is adnate or decurrent
- Stipe has a ring
- Spore print is brown
- Ecology is mycorrhizal
- Edibility is edible

Suillus lakei, commonly known as the matte Jack, Lake's bolete, or the western painted Suillus, is a species of fungus in the family Suillaceae. It is characterized by the distinctive reddish-brown tufted fibers or small scales on the cap, and the presence of a woolly veil on the stem. The caps can reach diameters of up to 15 cm (6 in), while the stems are between 6 and 12 cm (2 1/4 and 4 3/4 in) long and usually 1–3 cm (1/2–1 1/4 in) thick. On the underside of the cap is a layer of spongy yellow to yellow-brown angular pores; these pores are covered with a whitish partial veil when young.

A mycorrhizal fungus, S. lakei grows in association with Douglas-fir. It is native to northwestern North America, but has been introduced to Europe as well as South America and New Zealand. The mushroom is edible, but opinions vary as to its quality.

== Taxonomy ==
American mycologist William Alphonso Murrill originally named the species Boletinus lakei after mycologist E.R. Lake of Oregon Agricultural college (now Oregon State University). Lake collected the type specimen from Corvallis, Oregon, in late November, 1907. Rolf Singer later transferred the species to the genera Ixocomus and Boletinus in 1940 and 1945, respectively. In their 1964 monograph on North American Suillus species, Alexander H. Smith and Harry Delbert Thiers transferred the species to Suillus. Simultaneously, they described the S. lakei variety pseudopictus that they said had been misidentified by collectors as Suillus pictus (now called Suillus spraguei) because of its reddish and scaly cap. Singer considered Suillus amabilis to be the same species as S. lakei, but Smith and Thiers later examined the type material of both, and concluded that they were distinct species. Engel and colleagues described a variety in 1996, S. lakei var. landkammeri, based on Boletinus tridentinus subsp. landkammeri described by Czech mycologists Albert Pilát and Mirko Svrček in 1949. The nomenclatural databases Index Fungorum and MycoBank consider this synonymous with S. lakei. The mushroom is commonly known as the "western painted Suillus", the "matte Jack", or "Lake's slippery cap".

== Description ==
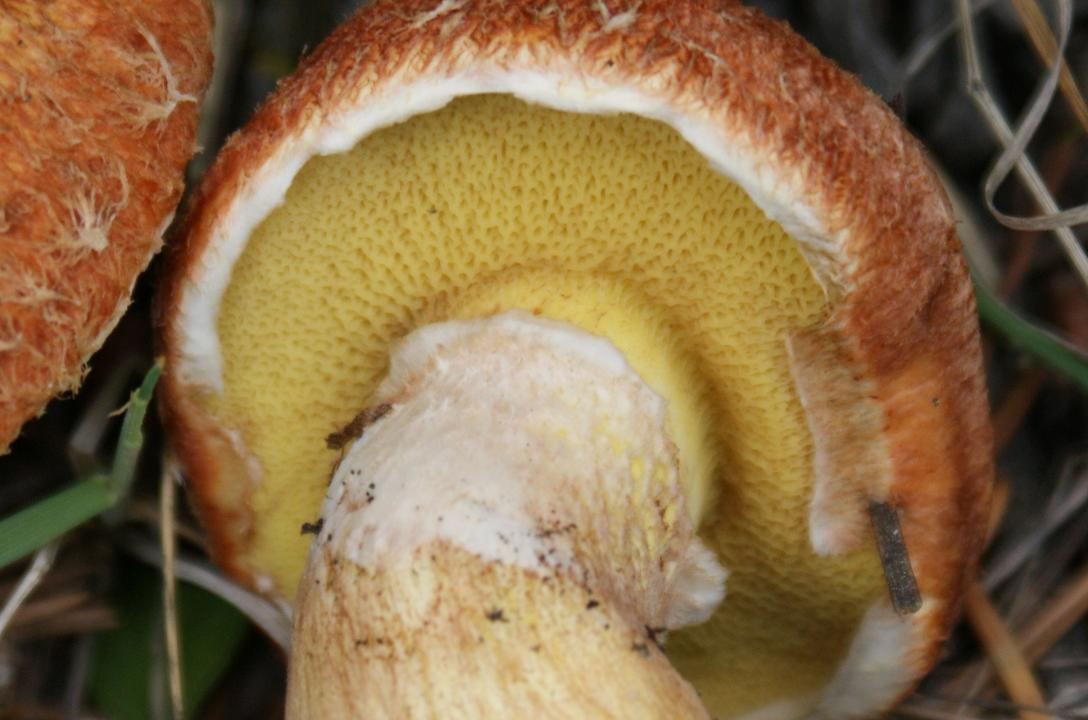
The pore surface of a young specimen

The cap of S. lakei is up to 15 cm (6 in) in diameter and initially convex, but flattens out somewhat in maturity. The cap is fleshy, dry, yellowish to reddish-brown but fades with age. It is covered with pressed-down hairs or minute tufted scales in the center, with the yellowish flesh visible between the scales. Heavy rain can wash the fibrils off the cap surface, leaving a sticky, glutinous layer behind. Older specimens may be nearly smooth in age. Remnants of the partial veil sometimes hang from the edge of the cap. The cap margin is initially curved or rolled inwards, but unrolls as it grows and in maturity may be curled upward.

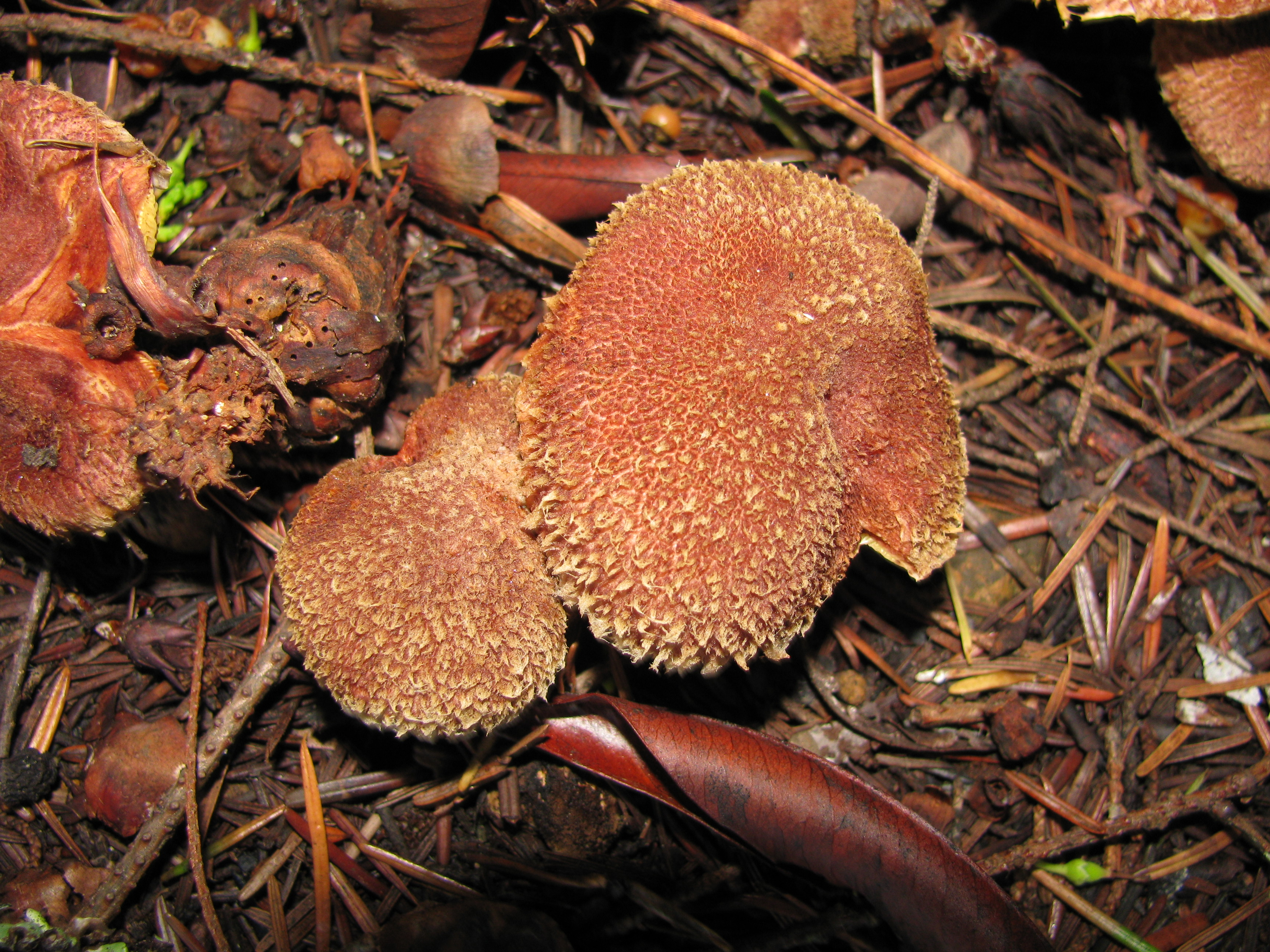
Variety pseudopictus has a red cap and prominent scales.

The tubes that comprise the pore surface on the underside of the cap are 5–12 mm (1/4–1/2 in) deep; the angular pores are up to 2.5 mm wide and radially arranged. The pores range in color from yellow to brownish-yellow to ochre, and stain brownish or reddish-brown when bruised. They are covered by a partial veil in young specimens. The flesh is thick, yellow, and either unchanged in color when bruised or broken, or turns pinkish-red. The stem is 6 to 12 cm (2 3/8 to 4 3/4 in) long and usually 1–3 cm (3/8–1 1/8 in) thick, yellow, sometimes with reddish streaks (particularly below the ring zone), and solid and yellow within. The species usually lacks the glandular dots on the stem that are characteristic of some Suillus species. The stem is either equal in width throughout its length, or tapered downwards. The tissue of the stem base may weakly stain bluish-green when cut, although this reaction is not usually apparent in mature specimens. The ring is delicate and floccose (resembling woolly tufts), and soon disappears or leaves a thin whitish ring on the stem. The spore print is cinnamon to brown in color. The variety calabrus, found in Italy, has a light yellow cap and purple-red scales. Variety pseudopictus has a cap that is redder and more scaly than the more common form.

The spores are spindle-shaped to elliptical, have a smooth surface, and dimensions of 8–11 to 3–4 μm. There are both two- and four-spored basidia (spore-bearing cells), and they are club-shaped, hyaline (translucent), with dimensions of 28–36 by 10–12 μm. Cystidia are plentiful, and are found in bundles lined along the tube mouths (as cheilocystidia), or more commonly, singly along the sides of the tubes (as pleurocystidia). These structures are thin-walled, cylindrical, and measure 48–60 by 7–9 μm. The scales on the cap surface comprise more or less erect hyphae with tips that are clustered together. Clamp connections are rare in the hyphae.

=== Similar species ===
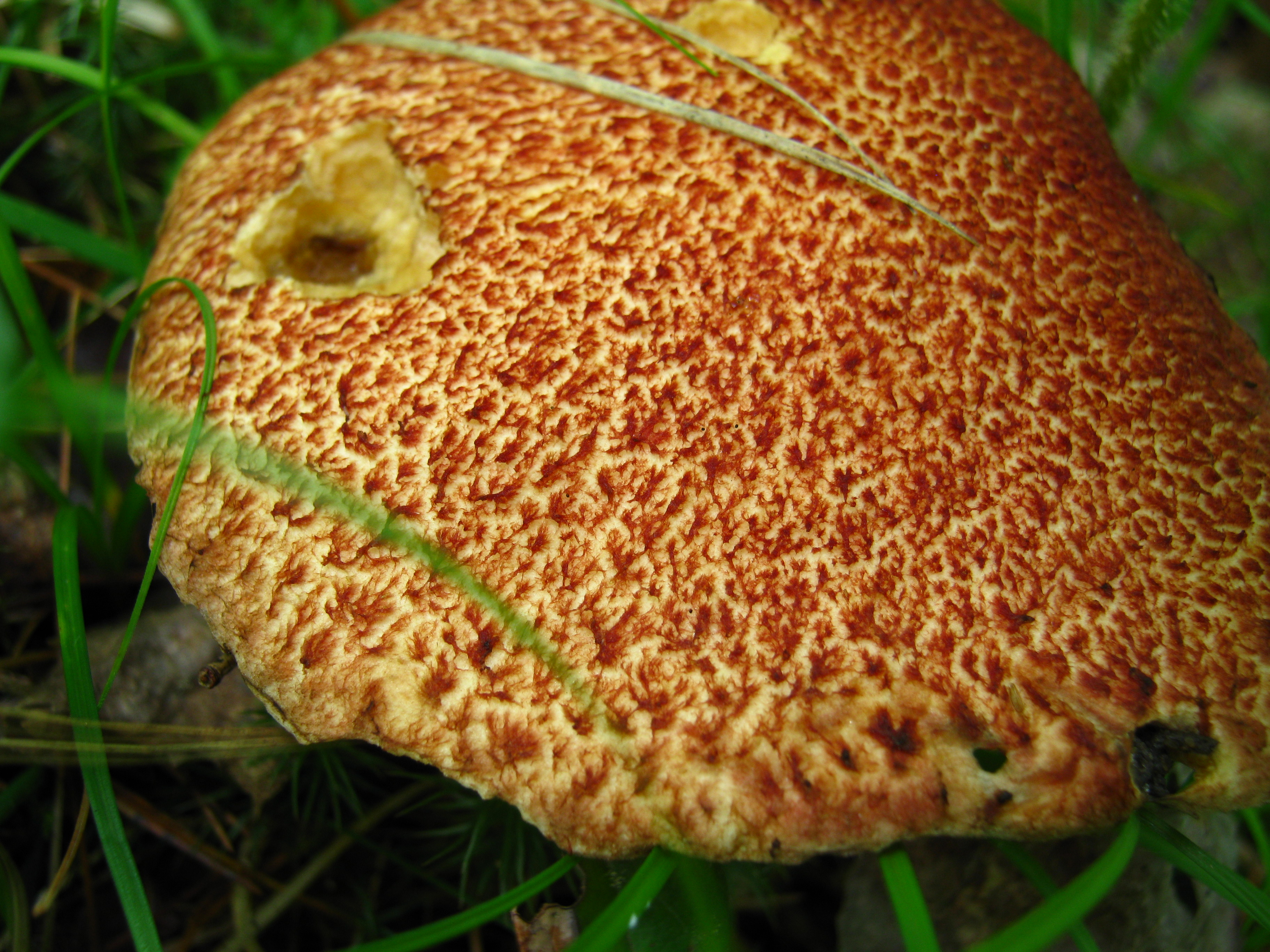
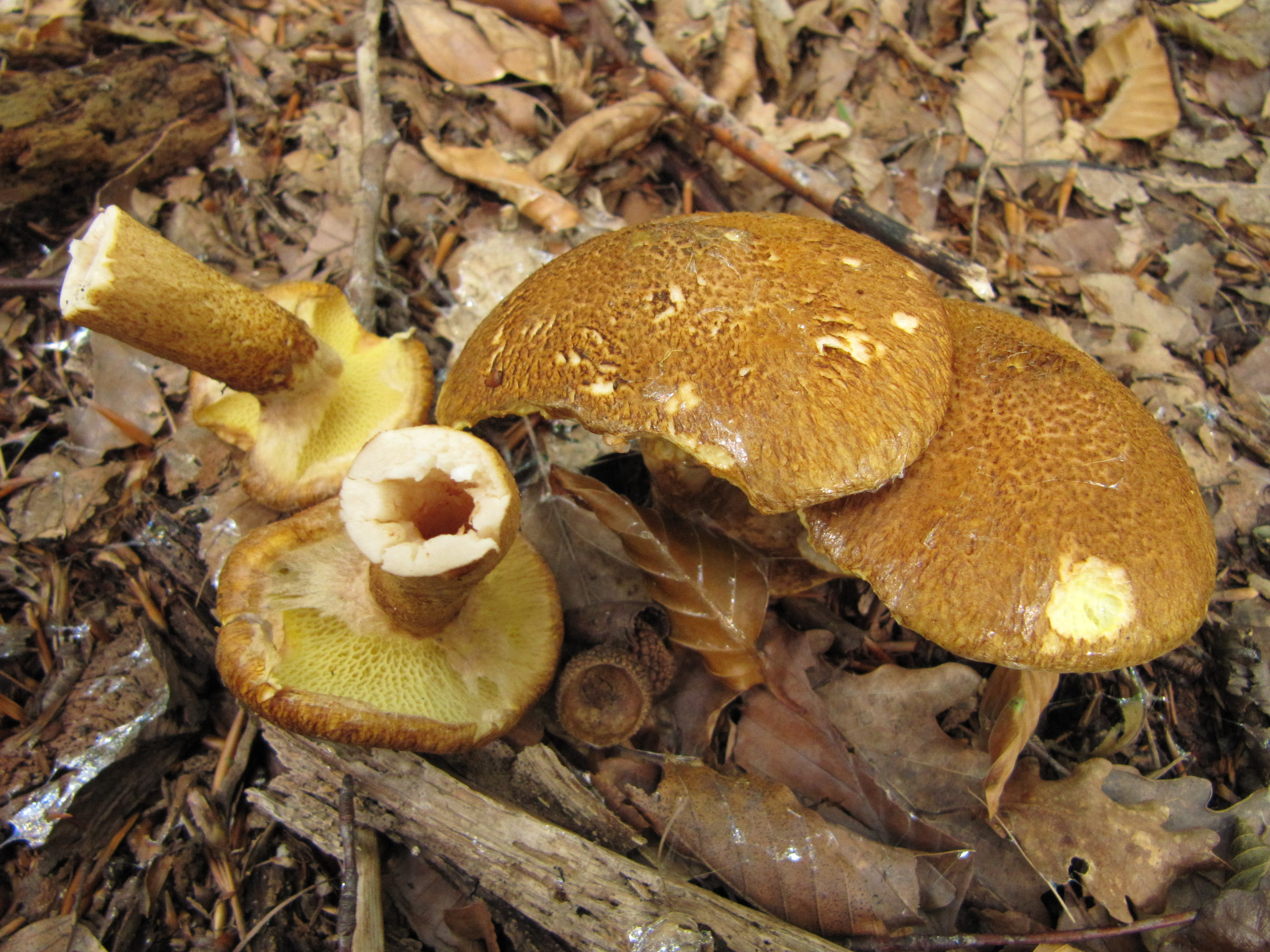
Lookalike species include Suillus spraguei (left) and S. cavipes (right)

Mushrooms with an appearance similar to S. lakei can often be distinguished by their associations with trees. For example, the eastern North American species S. spraguei grows in association with Eastern White Pine. The cap of S. spraguei has red fibrils on a yellow background. S. cavipes and S. ochraceoroseus always grow with Larch. S. ponderosus, which grows in mixed coniferous forests, has a gelatinous veil. Smith and Thiers note that it is difficult to tell the difference between the two if S. ponderosus has lost its veil, since the colors of the species intergrade and cannot reliably be used to distinguish them. S. decipiens has a cap that is orangish to pink-orange with hairs or scales. S. caerulescens is a similar species in western North America; it can be distinguished by the strong blue staining that develops when the stem is injured.

== Habitat and distribution ==
Suillus lakei is indigenous to the Rocky Mountains and western parts of North America. Its range extends south into Mexico. Fruit bodies grow solitarily or in groups on the ground in young conifer stands or grassy parkland. Fruiting occurs in the late summer and autumn, later on the West Coast. Suillus lakei forms ectomycorrhizae with Douglas-fir (Pseudotsuga menziesii), and its distribution coincides with this tree. It is one of the most common bolete species found in northwestern Montana and Idaho. In a study of host specificity in pure culture in the laboratory, S. lakei failed to form healthy ectomycorrhizas with Eucalyptus roots; the hyphae were covered in mucilage-like deposits and appeared to be collapsed. It has also been noted to prefer poor, exposed soil such as that found on road banks and campgrounds. It can often be found with the mushroom Gomphidius subroseus, another species that associates with Douglas-fir.

Both Douglas-fir and S. lakei are non-native introduced species in Europe. The fungus has been found in several central and south European countries following the intentional introduction of Douglas-fir. These include Bosnia and Herzegovina, Bulgaria, Czech Republic, Germany, Hungary, Italy, and Slovakia. It is considered endangered in the Czech Republic. Suillus lakei has also been reported in South America (Argentina and Chile) and in the South Island of New Zealand.

== Edibility ==
Suillus lakei is edible, although opinions vary considerably as to its quality. It has been called choice, mediocre, and of poor taste and texture. Laboratory tests indicate that the fruit bodies have antimicrobial activity, and contain alkaloids and tannins.

== See also ==
- List of North American boletes
