= Suillus appendiculatus =

Scientific classification
- Domain: Eukaryota
- Kingdom: Fungi
- Division: Basidiomycota
- Class: Agaricomycetes
- Order: Boletales
- Family: Suillaceae
- Genus: Suillus
- Species: S. appendiculatus

Binomial name
- Suillus appendiculatus (Peck) A.H.Sm. & Thiers (1964)

Synonyms
- Boletinus appendiculatus Peck (1896)

Species of fungus

Suillus appendiculatus is a species of bolete fungus in the family Suillaceae. It was first described scientifically in 1896 as a species of Boletinus by American mycologist Charles Horton Peck. Harry D. Thiers and Alexander H. Smith transferred it to the genus Suillus in 1964.

== See also ==
- List of North American boletes
