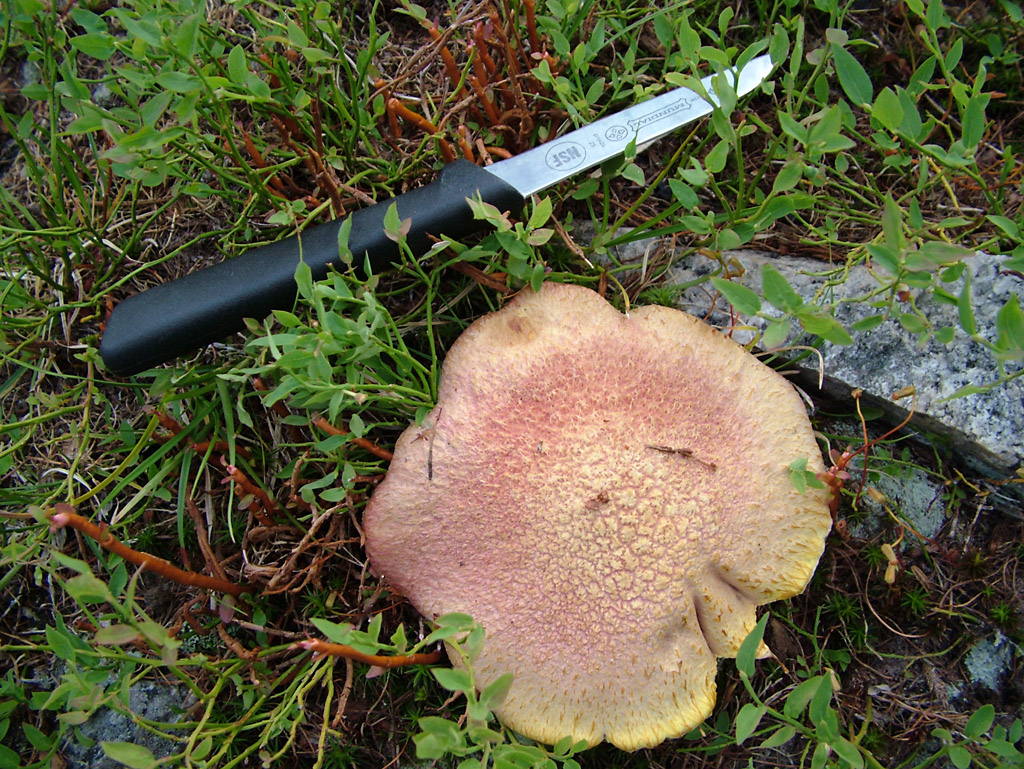

Scientific classification
- Kingdom: Fungi
- Division: Basidiomycota
- Class: Agaricomycetes
- Order: Boletales
- Family: Suillaceae
- Genus: Suillus
- Species: S. ochraceoroseus

Binomial name
- Suillus ochraceoroseus (Snell) Singer (1973)

Synonyms
- Boletinus ochraceoroseus Snell (1941); Fuscoboletinus ochraceoroseus (Snell) Pomerl. & A.H.Sm. (1962)

= Suillus ochraceoroseus =

Species of fungus

Suillus ochraceoroseus
- Mycological characteristics
- Pores on hymenium
- Cap is convex or flat
- Hymenium is adnate or decurrent
- Stipe has a ring or is bare
- Spore print is reddish-brown to purple-brown
- Ecology is mycorrhizal
- Edibility is edible

Suillus ochraceoroseus, commonly known as the rosey larch bolete, is a species of fungus in the genus Suillus. It is similar in appearance to S. lakei.

The mushroom appears with larch in early summer and is edible.

== Taxonomy ==
The species was first described by Wally Snell as Boletinus ochraceoroseus in 1941, based on specimens he had collected near Smith Creek in Idaho. René Pomerleau and Alexander H. Smith transferred it to Fuscoboletinus in 1962. In 1973, Rolf Singer transferred the species to Suillus.

== Description ==
The cap grows up to 25 centimetres (10 in) wide, whitish then red, dry, and fibrillose. The margin may be yellow and have buff veil remnants. The pores are yellow to brown. The stipe is up to 10 cm (4 in) long, yellowish with red-brown hues near the base, usually with a ring or ring zone, and often hollow. The flesh is yellowish and may stain blue-green. The spore print is reddish-brown.

The species is similar in appearance to S. lakei.

== Habitat ==
The mushroom appears with larch in early summer.

== Uses ==
The species is edible but has a bitter flavour.
