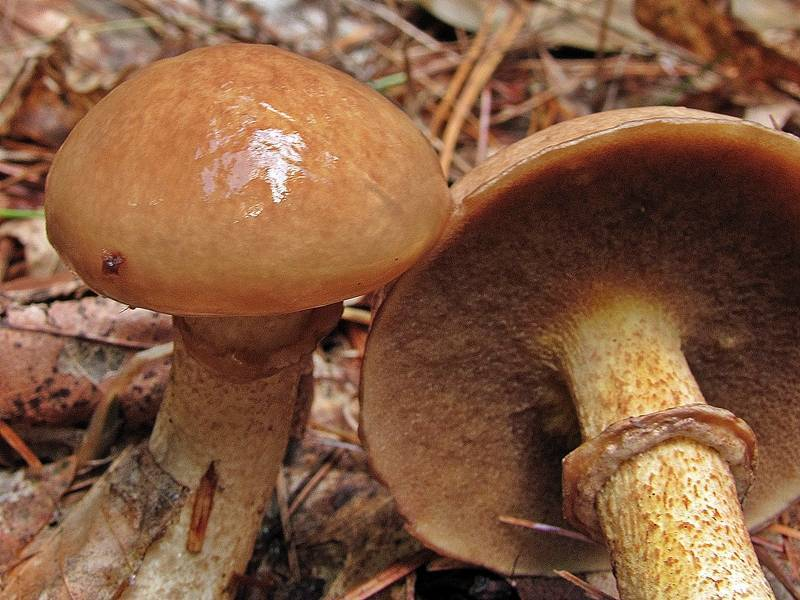

Scientific classification
- Domain: Eukaryota
- Kingdom: Fungi
- Division: Basidiomycota
- Class: Agaricomycetes
- Order: Boletales
- Family: Suillaceae
- Genus: Suillus
- Species: S. acidus

Binomial name
- Suillus acidus (Peck) Singer (1945)

Synonyms
- Boletus acidus Peck (1905)

= Suillus acidus =

Species of fungus

Suillus acidus is an edible species of mushroom in the genus Suillus. The species was first described by Charles Horton Peck as Boletus acidus in 1905.
