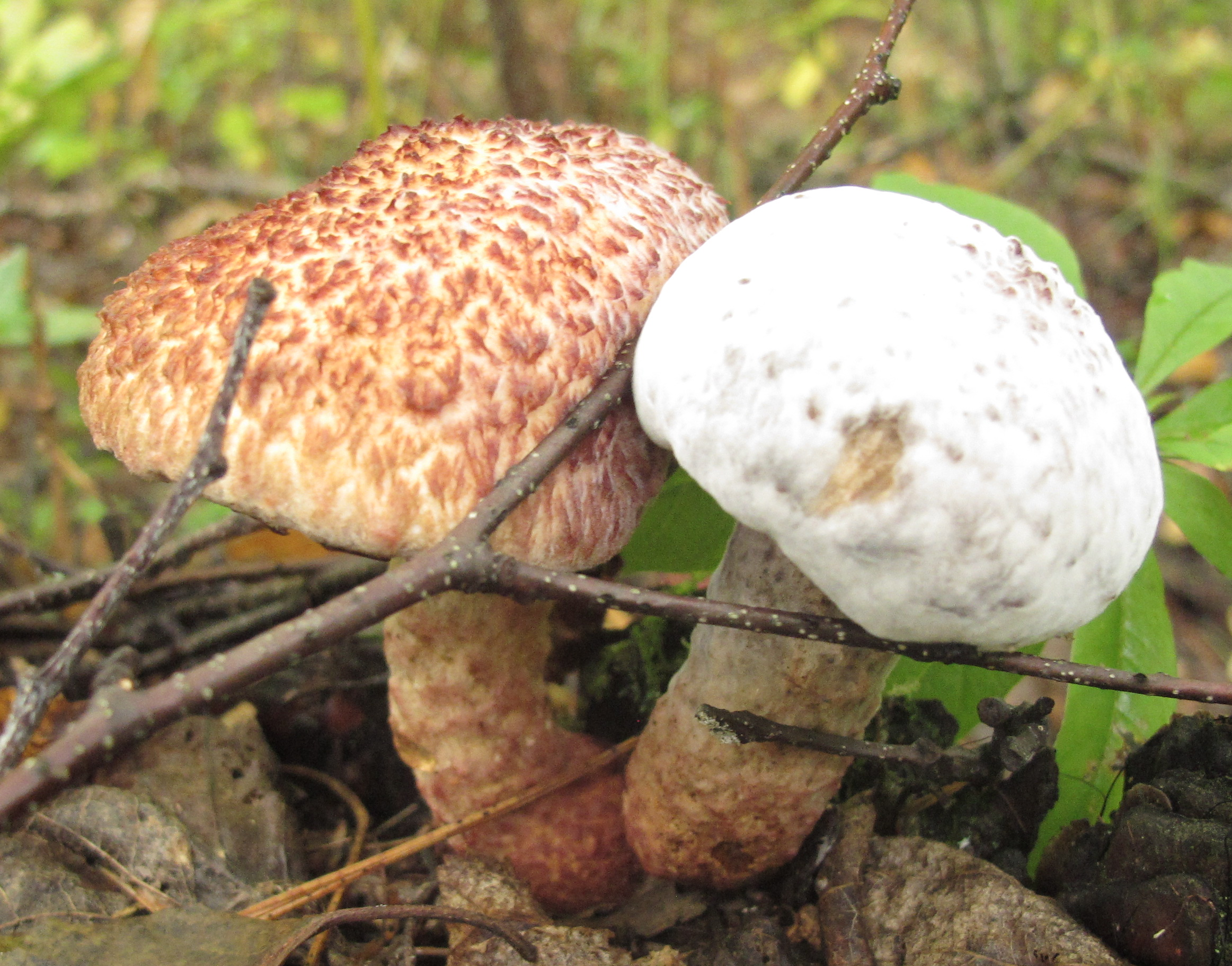
- Hypomyces completus parasitizing the bolete Suillus spraguei

Scientific classification
- Kingdom: Fungi
- Division: Ascomycota
- Class: Sordariomycetes
- Order: Hypocreales
- Family: Hypocreaceae
- Genus: Hypomyces
- Species: H. completus

Binomial name
- Hypomyces completus (G. R. W. Arnold) Rogerson & Samuels (1985)

Synonyms
- Peckiella completa G.R.W.Arnold (1971)

= Hypomyces completus =

Species of fungus

Hypomyces completus is a parasitic ascomycete in the order Hypocreales. The fungus grows on boletes, typically Suillus spraguei in North America, although the type collection was found on growing on Boletinus oxydabilis in Siberia. The color of its subiculum (a crust-like growth of mycelium) ranges from white initially to yellow-brown to greenish-brown to brown to black; the fruitbodies (perithecia) range from pale brown to dark brown to black. Spores measure 35–40 by 4–6 μm.

The species was described as new to science in 1971 by G. R. W. Arnold, who placed it in Peckiella, a genus segregated from Hypomyces by Pier Andrea Saccardo to contain species having unicellular ascospores. In their 1989 review, Rogerson and Samuels did not accept this genus as valid, stating "variations in these features occur, occasionally in a single perithecium", and they reclassified the fungus in Hypomyces. The anamorph species associated with H. completus is Sepedonium brunneum, first described by Charles Horton Peck in 1887.
