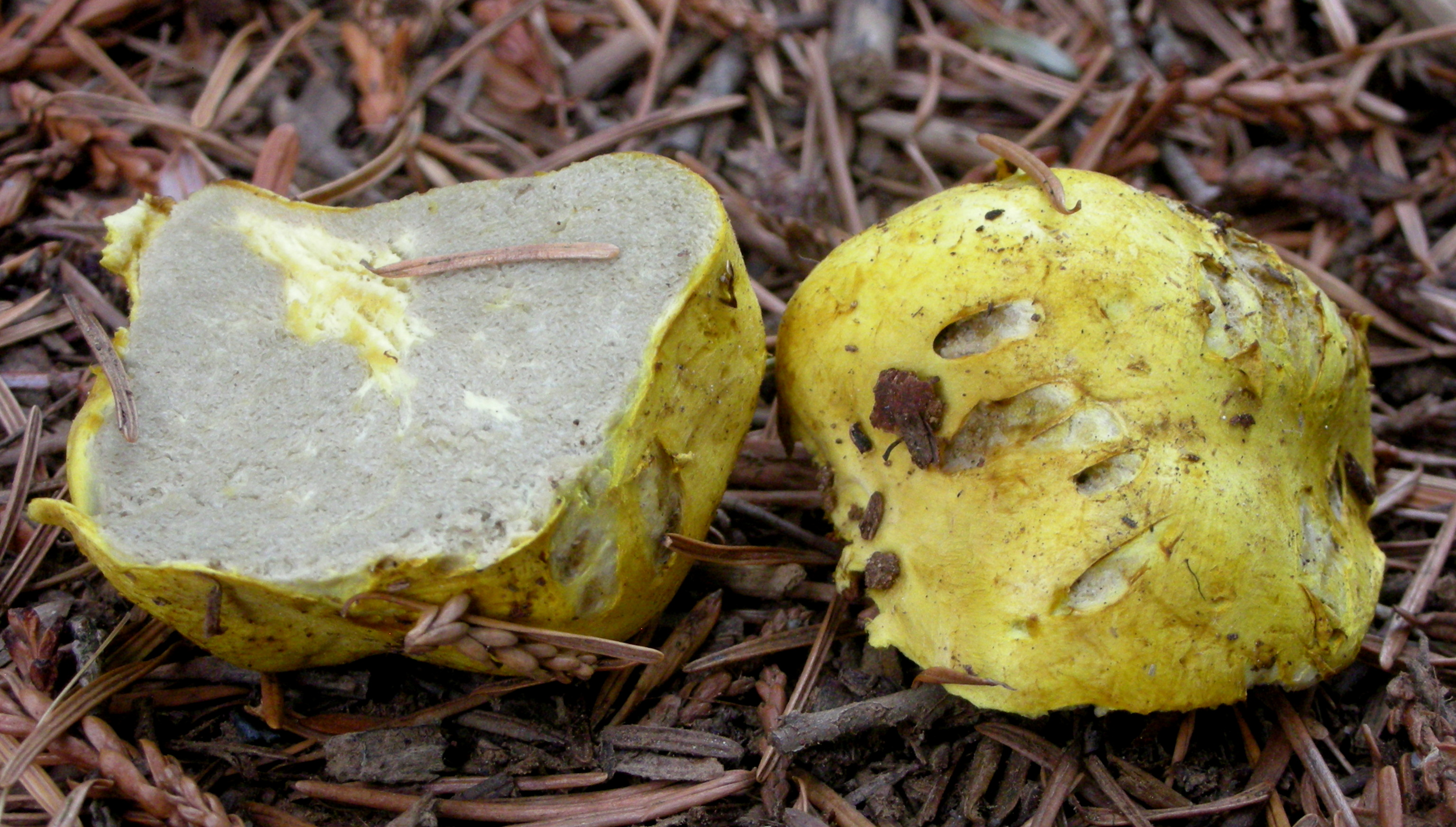
- Truncocolumella citrina

Scientific classification
- Kingdom: Fungi
- Division: Basidiomycota
- Class: Agaricomycetes
- Order: Boletales
- Family: Suillaceae
- Genus: Truncocolumella; Zeller (1939)

Type species
- Truncocolumella citrina Zeller (1939)

Species
- T. citrina T. occidentalis T. rubra

= Truncocolumella =

Genus of fungi

Truncocolumella is a genus of fungi in the family Suillaceae, of the order Boletales. It was circumscribed by American mycologist Sanford Myron Zeller in 1939.

The potato-like T. citrina is up to 7 cm broad. The spore mass is yellowish, darker in age. One field guide lists T. citrina as edible. David Arora cites one story that it may leave a licorice-like aftertaste that can persist for hours.

To determine the odour of T. citrina, mature fruiting bodies were extracted in diethyl ether and analyzed by gas chromatography-mass spectroscopy (GC-MS). The two major odor compounds that were identified are hexanoic acid and phenylacetaldehyde. These compounds were not found on examination of immature fruiting bodies.
