= Psiloboletinus =

Scientific classification
- Kingdom: Fungi
- Division: Basidiomycota
- Class: Agaricomycetes
- Order: Boletales
- Family: Suillaceae
- Genus: Psiloboletinus; Singer (1945)

Type species
- Psiloboletinus lariceti (Singer) Singer (1945)

Synonyms
- Phylloporus lariceti Singer (1938)

Genus of fungi

Psiloboletinus is a fungal genus in the family Suillaceae. This is a monotypic genus, containing the single species Psiloboletinus lariceti, first described by mycologist Rolf Singer in 1938 as a species of Phylloporus. Alexander H. Smith disagreed with Singer's generic concept, concluding "No matter what disposition of the type species of Psiloboletinus is eventually made, it is evident that there are no clearly distinctive characters on which to recognize the genus on the basis of Singer's descriptions."
