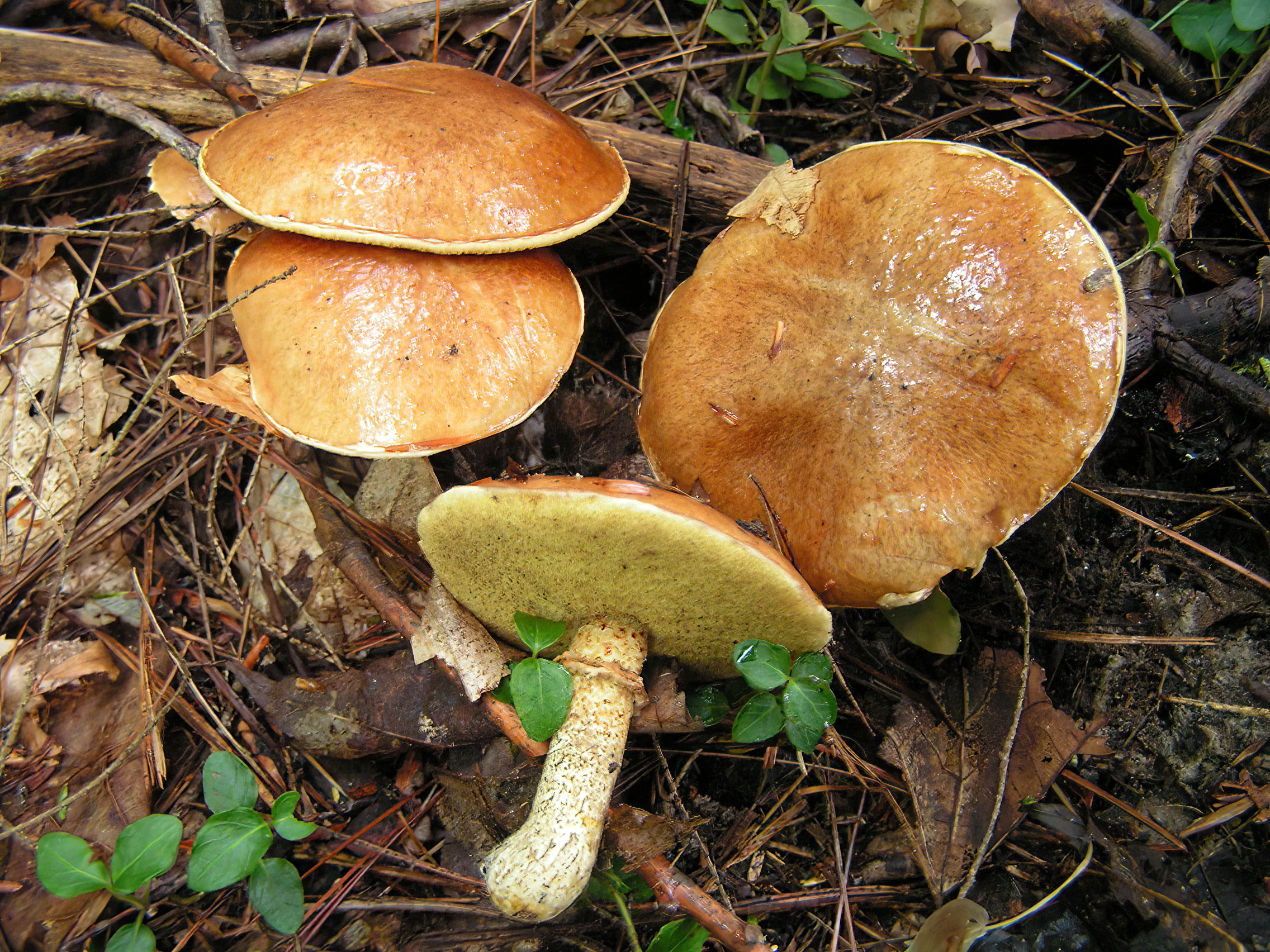

Scientific classification
- Domain: Eukaryota
- Kingdom: Fungi
- Division: Basidiomycota
- Class: Agaricomycetes
- Order: Boletales
- Family: Suillaceae
- Genus: Suillus
- Species: S. intermedius

Binomial name
- Suillus intermedius (A.H.Sm. & Thiers) A.H.Sm. & Thiers (1971)

Synonyms
- Boletellus intermedius A.H.Sm. & Thiers (1971); Xerocomus intermedius (A.H.Sm. & Thiers) Heinem., Rammeloo & Rullier (1988)

= Suillus intermedius =

Species of fungus

Suillus intermedius is an edible species of mushroom in the genus Suillus. It is found in North America, Costa Blanca Mountains-Spain.

== See also ==
- List of North American boletes
