= Suillus subalutaceus =

Scientific classification
- Kingdom: Fungi
- Division: Basidiomycota
- Class: Agaricomycetes
- Order: Boletales
- Family: Suillaceae
- Genus: Suillus
- Species: S. subalutaceus

Binomial name
- Suillus subalutaceus (A.H.Sm. & Thiers) A.H.Sm. & Thiers (1971)

Synonyms
- Suillus acidus var. subalutaceus A.H.Sm. & Thiers (1964)

Species of fungus

Suillus subalutaceus is an edible species of mushroom in the genus Suillus. It is found in North America and in Taiwan.

== See also ==
- List of North American boletes
