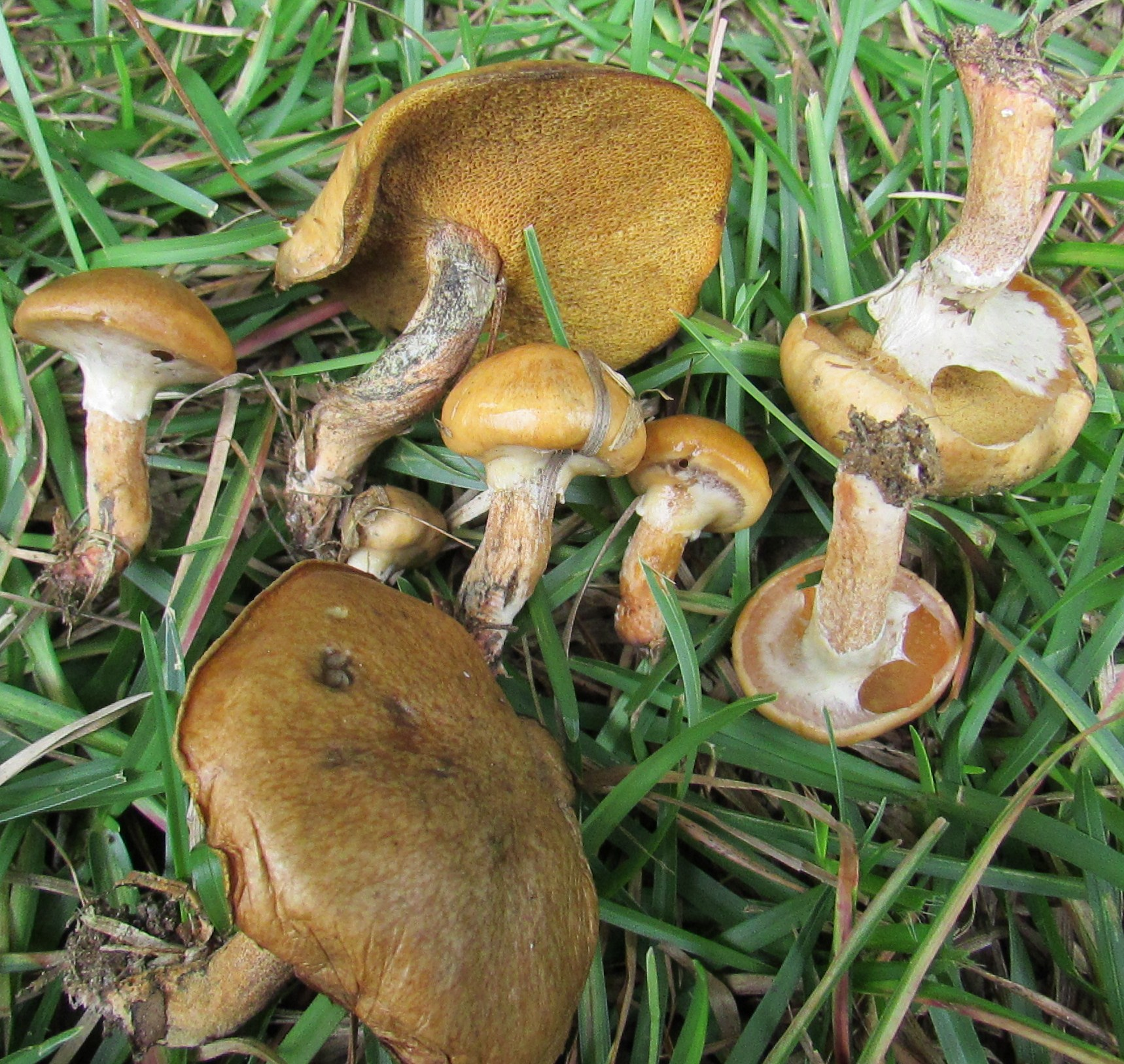

Scientific classification
- Domain: Eukaryota
- Kingdom: Fungi
- Division: Basidiomycota
- Class: Agaricomycetes
- Order: Boletales
- Family: Suillaceae
- Genus: Suillus
- Species: S. cothurnatus

Binomial name
- Suillus cothurnatus Singer (1945)

Synonyms
- Boletus luteus var. cothurnatus (Singer) Murrill (1948)

= Suillus cothurnatus =

Species of fungus

Suillus cothurnatus is a species of mushroom in the genus Suillus. Found in Malaysia, Brazil, and North America, it was first described scientifically by mycologist Rolf Singer in 1945.

== Description ==
The cap is obtuse to convex, and sometimes develops a broad umbo. The cap margin is initially turned inward, and usually has remnants of the partial veil hanging off. The cap surface is smooth, sticky, with a variable color ranging from yellow to yellow-brown to yellow-orange to cinnamon to olive brown to grayish brown or dark brown. The flesh is marbled orangish and pale yellow, and when cut or otherwise injured, it will stain dark purple-drab. The odor of the corthunatus ranges from fragrant to indistinct, and the taste is indistinct. The pore surface on the underside of the cap is initially pale yellow to orange-yellow, but it becomes brownish yellow when mature. The pores, which number 1 or 2 per millimeter, are irregular to radially elongated. The tubes comprising the pore layer are roughly 4 mm (0.16 in) deep. The stem measure 2.5–6 cm (1.0–2.4 in) long by 0.5–1.0 cm (0.2–0.4 in) thick, and it is nearly equal in width throughout or slightly larger near the base. It is solid (i.e. not hollow) with a dry surface that is covered with scattered brownish glandular dots on a whitish to yellowish to brownish background color. It has a thick, baggy partial veil that is whitish and somewhat rubbery in texture. The partial veil is slimy on the outer layer, and forms a band-like ring on the stem with a flaring lower edge. The mycelium at the base of the stem is salmon-colored.

Suillus cothurnatus produces a brown spore print. Spores are roughly elliptical to oblong to somewhat cylindrical, smooth, and measure 8–10 by 2.5–3.5 μm.

Fruit bodies are edible. They are used in mushroom dyeing to produce colors such as beige, light brown, or brownish orange, depending on the mordant used.

== Habitat and distribution ==
The fruit bodies of Suillus cothurnatus grow scattered or in groups on the ground in sandy soil near pine, especially two-needled pine such as red pine and jack pine. In the United States, its range extends from Texas to Florida, and north to North Carolina. The species is also present in Mexico, and has been introduced to Brazil. It has also been recorded from the Cameron Highlands in Malaysia.

== See also ==
- List of North American boletes
