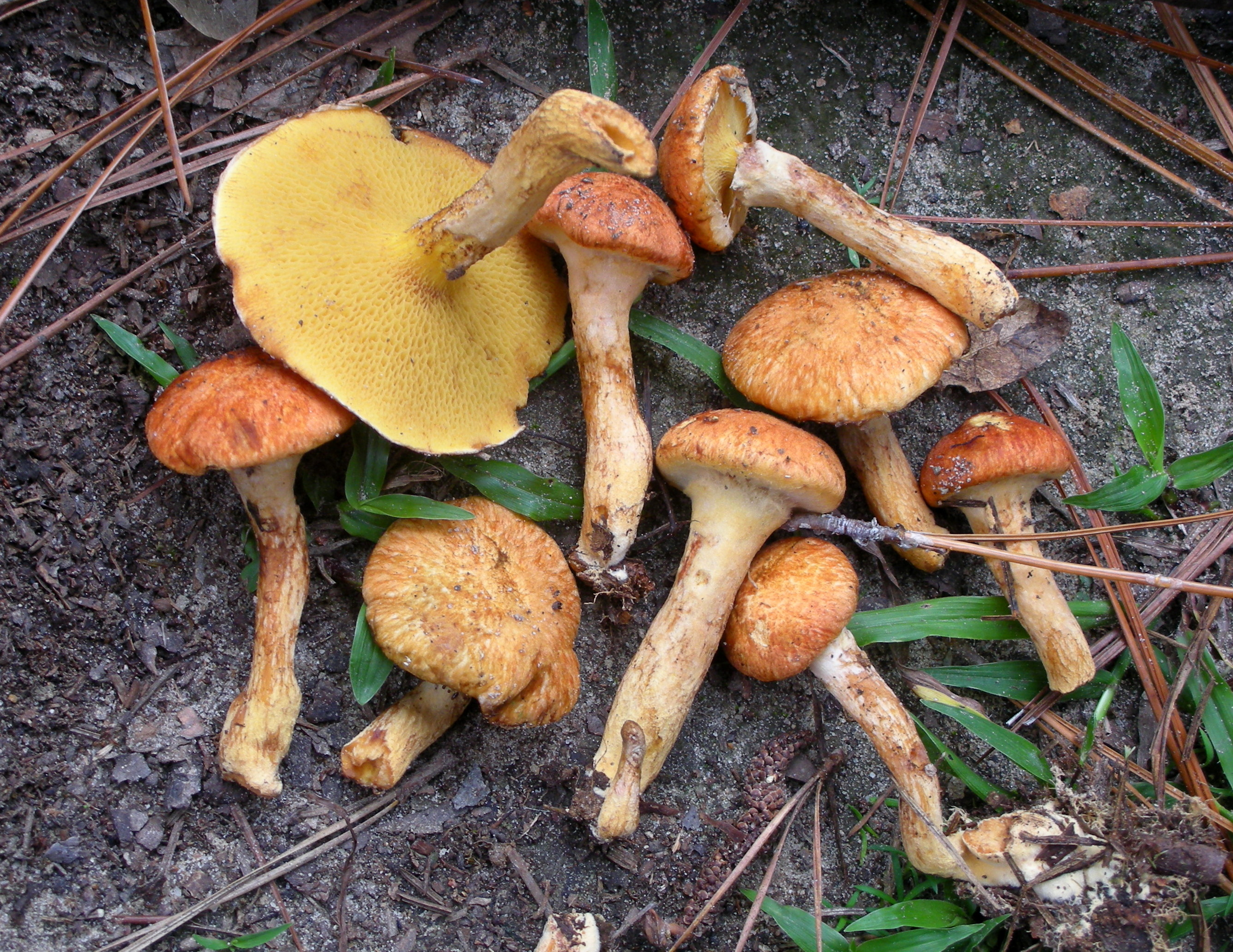

Scientific classification
- Kingdom: Fungi
- Division: Basidiomycota
- Class: Agaricomycetes
- Order: Boletales
- Family: Suillaceae
- Genus: Suillus
- Species: S. decipiens

Binomial name
- Suillus decipiens (Peck) Kuntze

Synonyms
- 1889 Boletinus decipiens Peck; 1909 Boletinus berkeleyi Murrill; 1944 Boletinus floridanus Murrill; 1996 Suillus berkeleyi (Murrill) H. Engel & Klofac

= Suillus decipiens =

Species of fungus

Suillus decipiens is a species of fungus in the family Suillaceae. First described by Charles Horton Peck in 1889 as Boletinus decipiens, it was transferred to Suillus in 1898 by Otto Kuntze.

The yellowish cap is 3.5–7 centimetres (1 3/8–2 3/4 in) wide, convex then flattening, with tannish scales. The yellow tubes are up to 5 millimetres (1/4 in) long. The pale stem is 4–7 cm (1 5/8–2 3/4 in) long and 7–15 mm (1/4–5/8 in) thick.

The species is found in southeastern North America, with the northern limit of its range extending to New Jersey. It is edible.

== See also ==
- List of North American boletes
