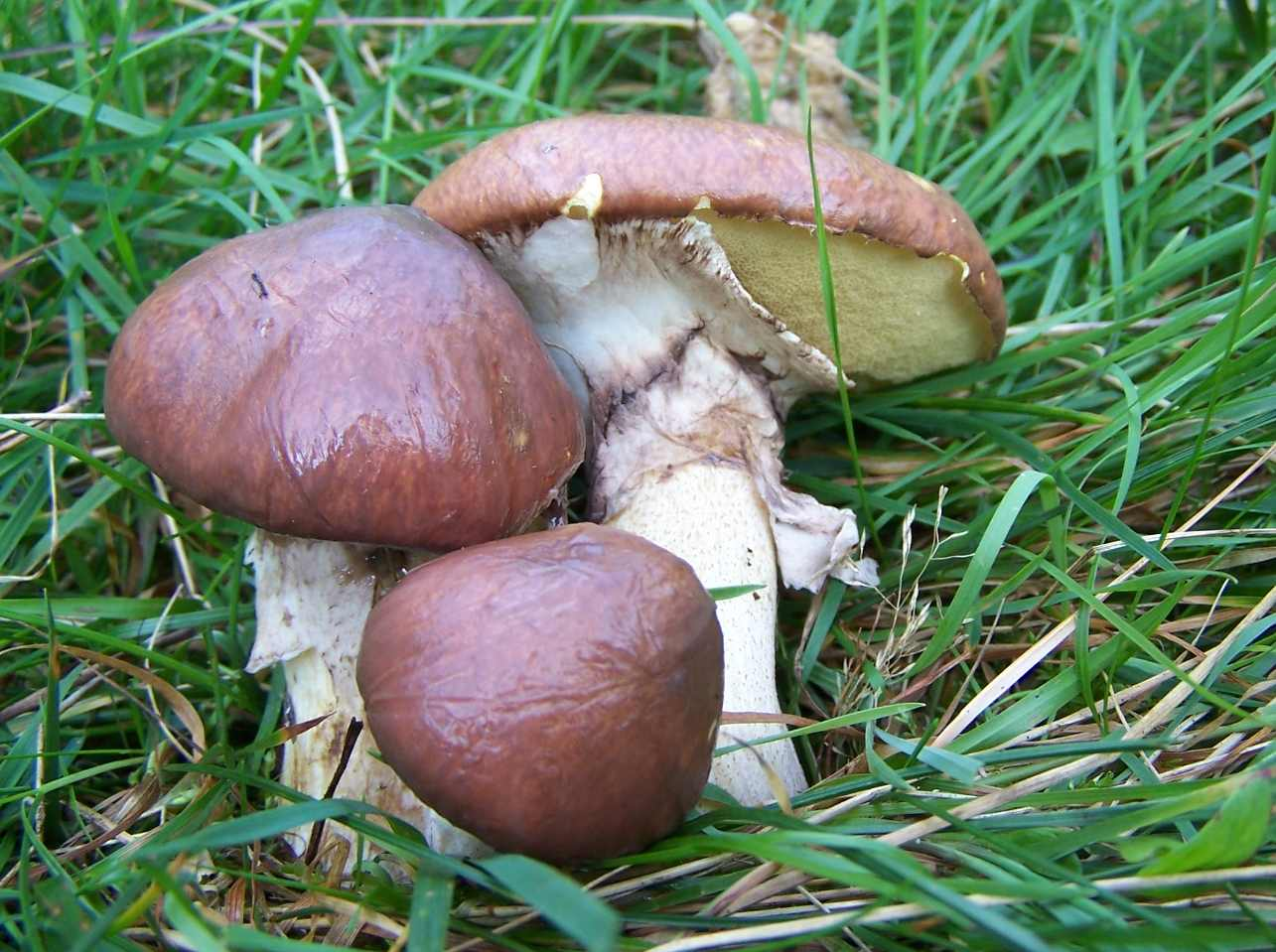
- Suillus luteus

Scientific classification
- Kingdom: Fungi
- Division: Basidiomycota
- Class: Agaricomycetes
- Order: Boletales
- Family: Suillaceae; Besl & Bresinsky (1997)

Type genus
- Suillus Gray (1821)

Genera
- Psiloboletinus; Suillus; Truncocolumella

= Suillaceae =

Family of fungi

The Suillaceae are a family of fungi in the order Boletales (suborder Suillineae), containing the boletus-like Suillus, the small truffle-like Truncocolumella, as well as the monotypic genus Psiloboletinus. As of 2008, there are 54 species in the family. Gastrosuillus, once considered a distinct genus, has been shown with molecular analysis to be a recent evolutionary derivative of Suillus. Fuscoboletinus, described by Pomerleau and Smith in 1962, has also been subsumed into Suillus.
