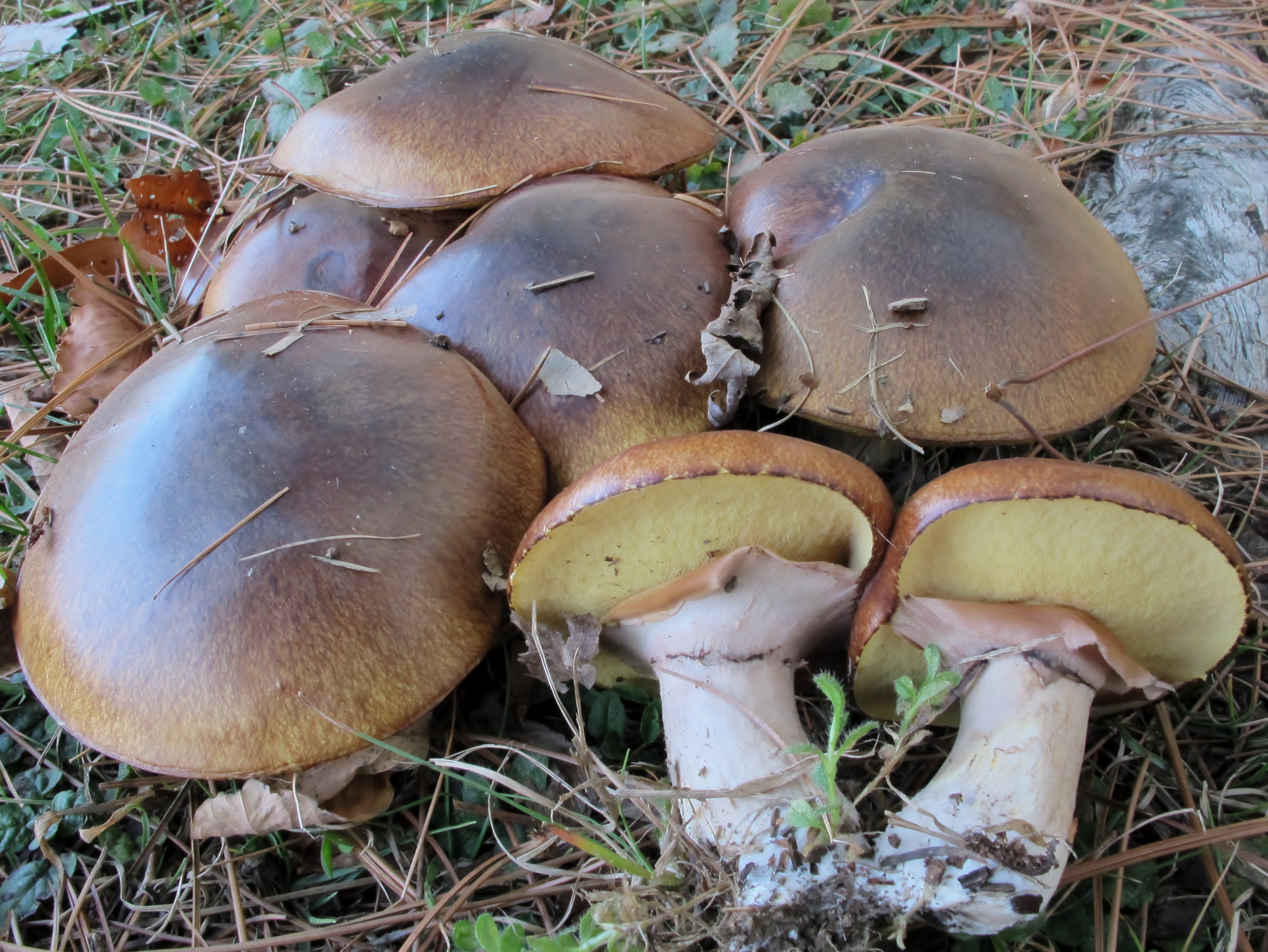

Conservation status
- Least Concern (IUCN 3.1)

Scientific classification
- Kingdom: Fungi
- Division: Basidiomycota
- Class: Agaricomycetes
- Order: Boletales
- Family: Suillaceae
- Genus: Suillus
- Species: S. luteus

Binomial name
- Suillus luteus (L.) Roussel (1796)

Synonyms
- Boletus luteus L. (1753); Boletus volvatus Batsch (1783); Cricunopus luteus (L.) P.Karst. (1881); Viscipellis luteus (L.) Quél. (1886); Ixocomus luteus (L.) Quél. (1888); Boletopsis lutea (L.) Henn. (1898)

= Suillus luteus =

Species of edible fungus in the family Suillaceae native to Eurasia

Suillus luteus
- Mycological characteristics
- Pores on hymenium
- Cap is convex
- Hymenium is adnate or subdecurrent
- Stipe has a ring
- Spore print is brown
- Ecology is mycorrhizal
- Edibility is edible

Suillus luteus is a species of bolete fungus commonly referred to as slippery jack or sticky bun. The fungus was originally assigned to Boletus by Carl Linnaeus in 1753, before being made the type species of Suillus in 1796. The slimy cap is typically up to 10 cm (4 in) wide and conical before flattening. A membranous partial veil connects the cap to the stem when young. Yellow tubes extend downward from the underside of the cap, which spores escape through. The pale stem is up to 10 cm (4 in) tall and 3 cm (1 1/4 in) thick, bearing small dots near the top. Unlike most other boletes, it bears a distinctive membranous ring, tinged brown to violet on the underside.

A common fungus native all across Eurasia from Ireland to Korea, it has been introduced widely elsewhere, including North and South America, southern Africa, Australia and New Zealand. The fungus grows in coniferous forests in its native range, and pine plantations in countries where it has become naturalized. It forms symbiotic ectomycorrhizal associations with living trees by enveloping the tree's underground roots with sheaths of fungal tissue. The fruit bodies are often produced in large numbers above ground in summer and autumn.

The mushroom is edible, though not as highly regarded as other boletes. It is commonly prepared and eaten in soups, stews or fried dishes. The slime coating, however, may cause indigestion if not removed before eating. It is often sold as a dried mushroom.

== Taxonomy ==
The species was one of the many first described in 1753 by the "father of taxonomy" Carl Linnaeus, who, in the second volume of his Species Plantarum, gave it the name Boletus luteus. The specific epithet is the Latin adjective lūtěus, meaning "yellow". The fungus was reclassified as (and became the type species of) the genus Suillus by French naturalist Henri François Anne de Roussel in 1796. Suillus is an ancient term for fungi, and is derived from swine. In addition to the British Mycological Society approved name "slippery jack", other common names for this bolete include "pine boletus" and "sticky bun"—the latter referring to its resemblance to the pastry.

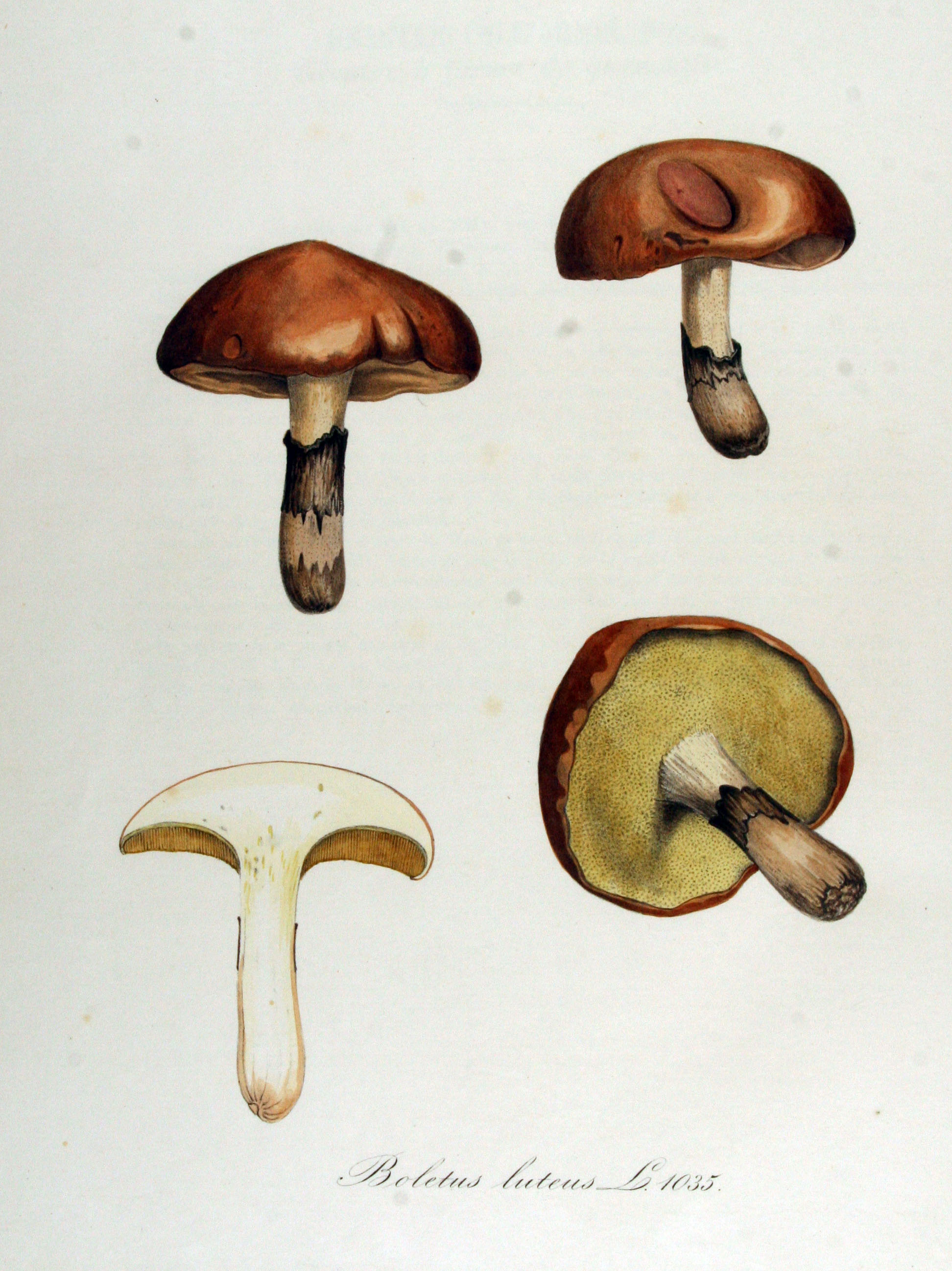
"Boletus luteus", illustrated by Christiaan Sepp

German naturalist August Batsch described Boletus volvatus (the specific epithet derived from the Latin volva, meaning "sheath", "covering" or "womb") alongside B. luteus in his 1783 work Elenchus Fungorum. Batsch placed both of these species, along with B. bovinus and the now obsolete names Boletus mutabilis and B. canus, in a grouping of similar boletes he called "subordo Suilli". Boletus volvatus is now considered a synonym of Suillus luteus. Several authors have placed the slippery jack in other genera: Finnish mycologist Petter Karsten classified it as Cricunopus luteus in 1881—the genus Cricinopus defined by yellow adnate tubes; Lucien Quélet classified it as Viscipellis luteus in 1886, and Ixocomus luteus in 1888; and Paul Christoph Hennings placed it in the section Cricinopus of the genus Boletopsis in 1900.

In works published before 1987, the slippery jack was written fully as Suillus luteus (L.:Fr.) Gray, as the description by Linnaeus had been name sanctioned in 1821 by the "father of mycology", Swedish naturalist Elias Magnus Fries. The starting date for all the mycota had been set by general agreement as 1 January 1821, the date of Fries's work. Furthermore, as Roussel's description of Suillus predated this as well, the authority for the genus was assigned to British botanist Samuel Frederick Gray in the first volume of his 1821 work A Natural Arrangement of British Plants. The 1987 edition of the International Code of Botanical Nomenclature changed the rules on the starting date and primary work for names of fungi, and names can now be considered valid as far back as 1 May 1753, the date of publication of Linnaeus's work. In 1986, a collection of fruit bodies from Sweden was designated as the neotype of Suillus luteus.

In their 1964 monograph on North American Suillus species, Alexander H. Smith and Harry Delbert Thiers classified S. luteus in the series Suilli of the section Suillus in genus Suillus. This group is characterized by the presence of either a ring on the stipe (or stem), a partial veil adhering to the cap margin, or a "false veil" not attached to the stipe but initially covering the tube cavity. Species closely related to Suillus luteus include S. pseudobrevipes (a sister species), S. brevipes and S. weaverae (formerly Fuscoboletinus weaverae). A genetic study of nucleotide DNA reinforced the species' monophyly and low genetic divergence, with material of S. luteus from the United Kingdom, Austria, Germany and North America forming a clade, in contrast with some other species, such as S. granulatus, which were shown to be polyphyletic.

Chemical analysis of pigments and chromogens showed that Suillus was more closely related to Gomphidius and Rhizopogon than to other boletes, and hence Suillus luteus and its allies were transferred from the Boletaceae to the newly circumscribed family Suillaceae in 1997. Molecular studies have reinforced how distantly related these fungi are from Boletus edulis and its allies.

== Description ==
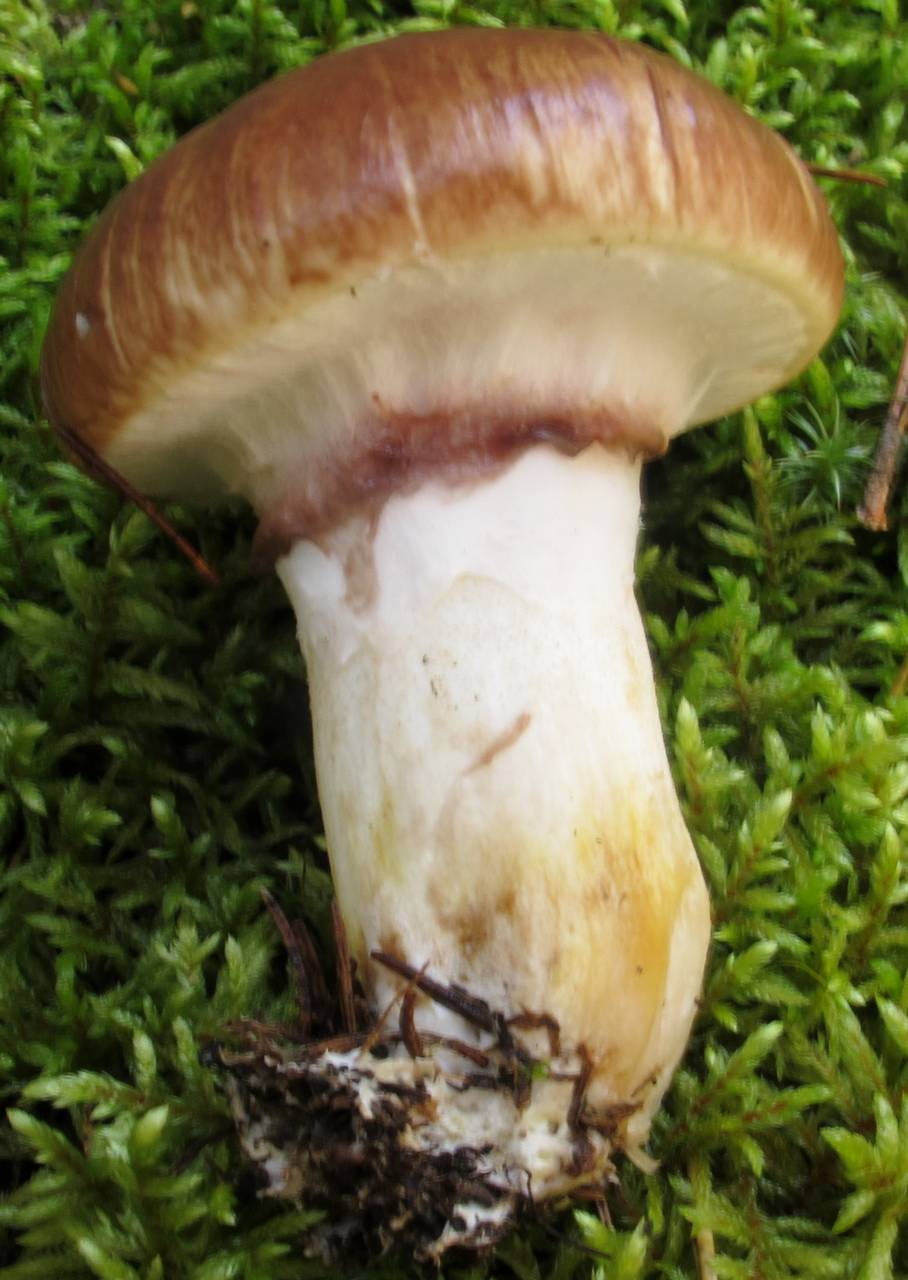
Young fruit bodies have a partial veil that encloses the pores.

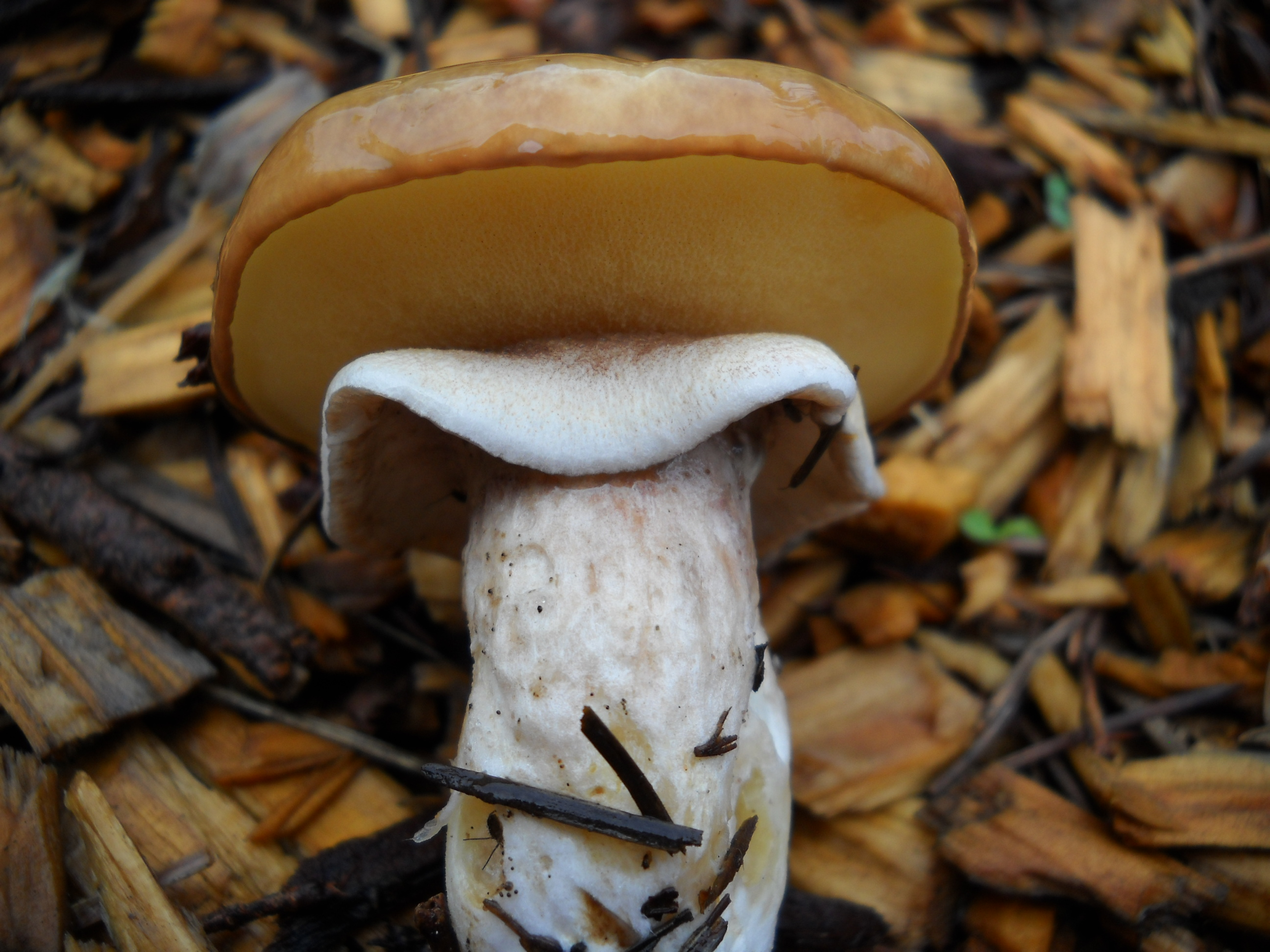
In maturity, the partial veil rips away from the cap, remaining on the upper stipe as a well-developed, membranous ring.

The cap is chestnut, rusty, olive brown, or dark brown in color with a diameter of 4–10 centimetres (1 1/2–4 in), rarely up to 20 cm. The cap has a distinctive conical shape, later flattening out. It is slimy to the touch, bare, smooth, and glossy even when dry, and the cuticle is easily peeled off. The tiny, circular pores of the tubes are initially yellow but turn olive to dark yellow with maturity. Like the skin of the cap, they can be readily peeled away from the flesh.

Tubes comprising the hymenophore on the underside of the cap are 3–7 mm (1/8–1/4 in) deep, with an attachment to the stipe ranging from adnate to somewhat decurrent. The pores are tiny, numbering 3 per mm in young specimens and 1–2 per mm in maturity. The stipe is 5–10 cm (2–4 in) tall and 2–3 cm (3/4–1 1/4 in) wide. It is pale yellow and more or less cylindrical but may bear a swollen base. A membranous partial veil initially links the stipe with the edge of the cap. When it ruptures, it forms a membranous, hanging ring. The top side of the ring is whitish, while the underside is characteristically dark brown to violet. This species is one of the few members of the genus Suillus that have such a ring. Above the ring, the stipe features glandular dots—minute clumps of pigmented cells. Below the ring, the stipe is dingy white, sometimes streaked with brownish slime. In humid conditions, the ring has a gelatinous texture. The white flesh of the entire fungus does not discolour when damaged, and is soft—particularly in mature specimens. It has a "pleasant" taste and lacks any distinctive odour.

The spore print is ochre or clay coloured, the elongated elliptical spores measuring 7–10 by 3–3.5 μm. Basidia (spore-producing cells) are four spored, with dimensions of 14–18 by 4–5 μm. Cystidia are present on both the tube faces (pleurocystidia) and edges (cheilocystidia), either scattered or, more rarely, as bundles. They measure 20–35 by 5–7 μm and have a narrow club shape. Clamp connections are not present in the hyphae of S. luteus.

=== Similar species ===
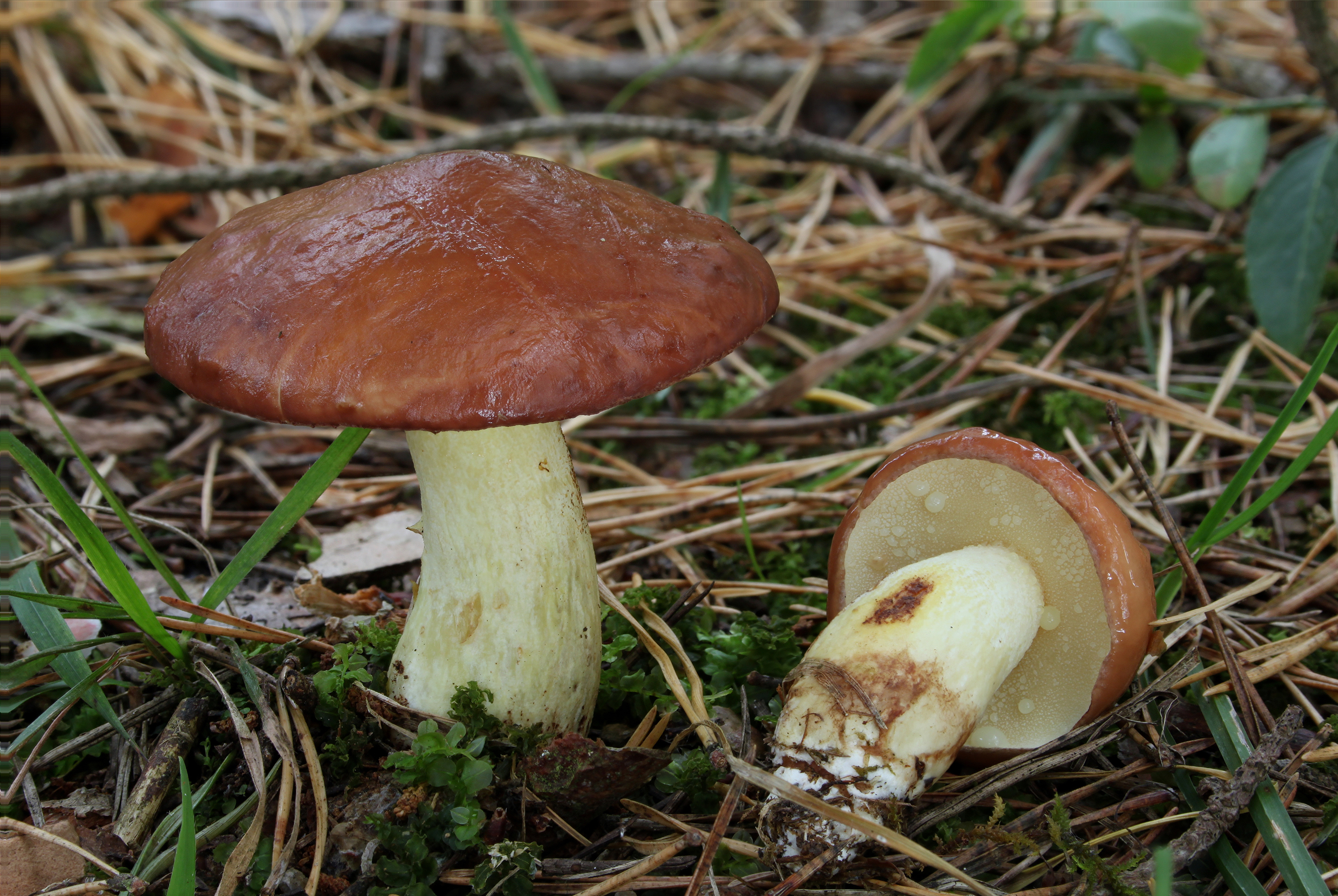
Suillus granulatus, a frequent lookalike

Good field characteristics for the species include the slimy brown cap, glandular dots on the upper stipe, and prominent purplish ring. A frequent lookalike is S. granulatus, which is another common, widely distributed and edible species occurring in the same habitat; it is yellow fleshed and exudes latex droplets when young, but most conspicuously bears neither a partial veil nor a ring. Other than that, S. luteus is unlikely to be confused with other mushrooms, especially if its preferred habitat under pine trees and the whitish partial veil are considered. In Europe, the related S. grevillei is found under larch and has a yellow cap, while immature fruit bodies of Gomphidius glutinosus may look comparable from above but have gills rather than pores underneath. In North America, Suillus borealis and S. pseudobrevipes also have partial veils, but lack the distinctive ring of S. luteus. S. cothurnatus forms a band-like ring on the stipe that tends to be brownish rather than purplish.

In some specimens of S. luteus, the partial veil separates from the stipe (rather than the cap margin), leaving cottony patches of veil hanging from the cap margin. In this state, fruit bodies can be confused with those of S. albidipes. Unlike S. luteus, however, S. albidipes does not have glandular dots on its stipe.

== Distribution and habitat ==
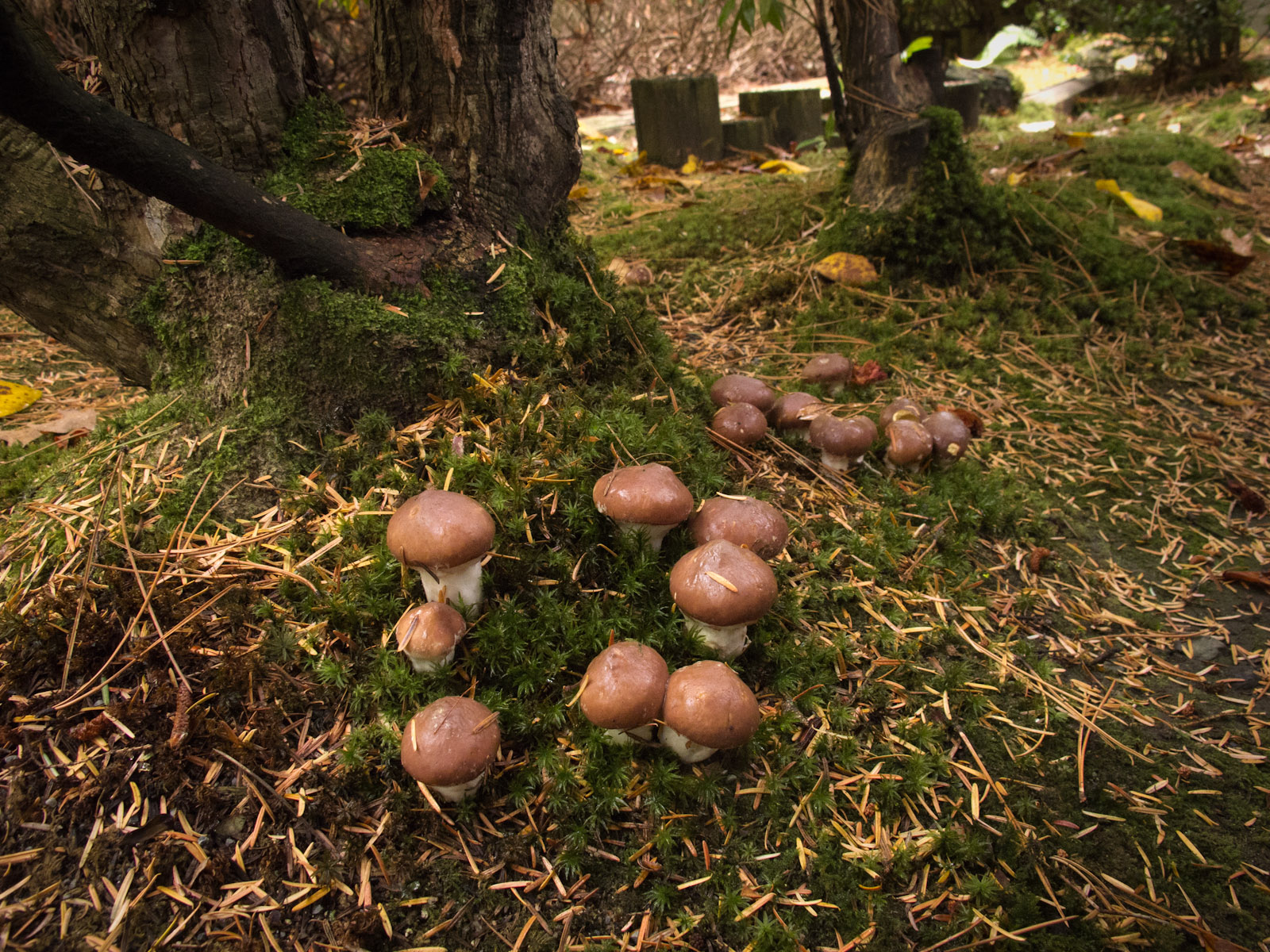
Growing under host tree, Finland

Suillus luteus can be found all over the Northern Hemisphere. Native to Eurasia, it is widespread across the British Isles. To the east it has been recorded from Pakistan, where it was found along canals in Dashkin in the district of Astore, and as far east as South Korea. It has also been widely introduced elsewhere by way of pine plantations around the globe. It is very commonly found in Monterey pine (Pinus radiata) plantations, despite the tree being native to California and hence not in the fungus' native range. In North America it is found in the northeastern, northwestern, and southwestern United States. According to Ernst Both, it was Charles Horton Peck who first suggested in 1887 that the fungus was introduced to the state of New York on Pinus sylvestris. DNA studies show that the North American populations differ little genetically from European populations, supporting the idea that the fungus arrived to North America relatively recently as a result of human activity. Suillus luteus is found in coastal and mountainous pine forests and exhibits a tolerance of the northern latitudes. Southern Hemisphere locales where the slippery jack grow with plantation pines include South America, Africa, Australia, and New Zealand. In southwestern Australia, the bolete is limited to areas of greater than 1000 mm (40 in) annual rainfall. It has been recorded as far north as the Darling Downs and southern Queensland, and occasionally in Tasmania. The fungus fruits in spring, summer and fairly prolifically in autumn, following periods of wet weather. Mushrooms can appear in large troops or fairy rings.

In Ecuador, Pinus radiata plantations were planted extensively around Cotopaxi National Park, and Suillus luteus boletes appear in abundance year-round. A 1985 field study estimated production to be 3000–6000 mushrooms per hectare—up to 1,000 kilograms (2,200 lb) (dry weight) of mushrooms hectare per year. This continuous production contrasts with the bolete's seasonal appearance elsewhere. The fungus is not found in adjacent areas of native vegetation. The fruiting is so bountiful that the harvest of slippery jacks has become the main reason that pine plantations are established or maintained in parts of Ecuador.

In southern Brazil, it has been recorded in plantations of slash pine (P. elliottii) in the municipalities of Pelotas, Nova Petrópolis and Canela in Rio Grande do Sul, and Colombo in Paraná. It is particularly common in plantations in Patagonia. Suillus luteus is the commonest bolete encountered in the Falkland Islands, where it is found in windbreaks and gardens.

In South Africa, Suillus luteus has been occasionally recorded under pines in Bloemfontein, Johannesburg and Royal Natal National Park.

== Ecology ==
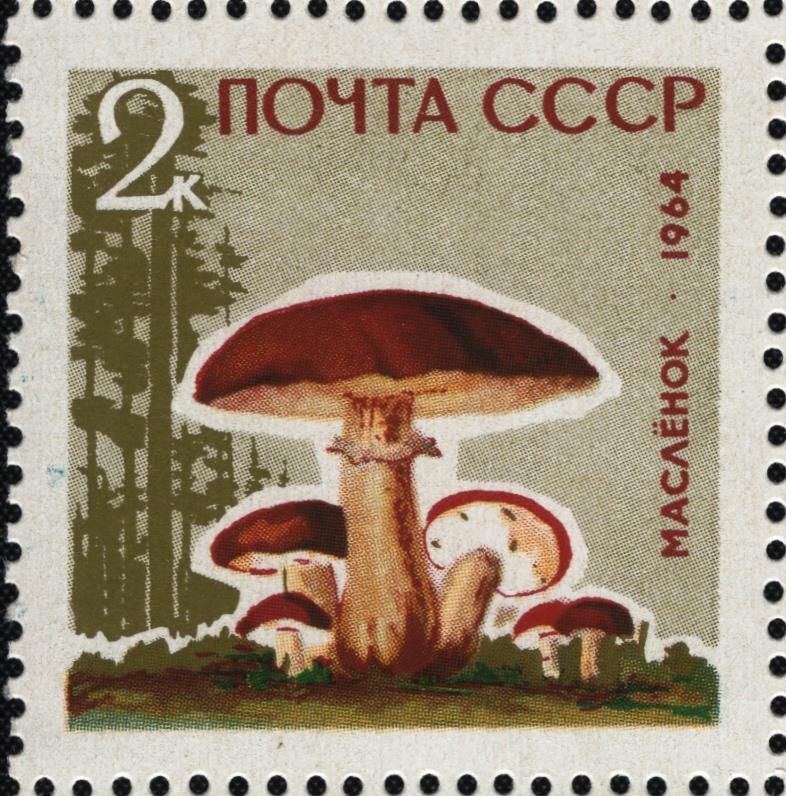
Depicted on a 1964 Soviet Union postage stamp

Suillus luteus is a pioneer species that typically establishes itself in the early stages of forest succession. The fungus forms mycorrhizal associations with various species of pine, including Scots pine (P. sylvestris), black pine (P. nigra), and Macedonian pine (P. peuce) in Europe, and red pine (P. resinosa) and white pine (P. strobus) in North America. An in vitro experiment demonstrated that the species could form an ectomycorrhizal association with Aleppo pine (P. halepensis), a key species used in reforestation in the Mediterranean. A study of the ectomycorrhizal fungi associated with a lodgepole pine (P. contorta) invasion front near Coyhaique, Chile, showed that many invasive trees were supported by S. luteus as the sole mycorrhizal partner.

The ectomycorrhizae formed between the fungus and host plant can be influenced by soil microorganisms present in the mycorrhizosphere. For example, soil bacteria from the genera Paenibacillus and Burkholderia alter the branching structure of the root, whereas Bacillus species increase root growth and mycorrhizal colonization. The fungus does not require a specific soil but seems to prefer acidic and nutrient-deficient soil. Suillus luteus produces hydroxamic acid-based siderophores, which are compounds that can chelate iron and extract it from the soil in nutrient-poor conditions. Ignacio Chapela and colleagues analysed the carbon uptake of S. luteus in Ecuador, concluding pine plantations accompanied by S. luteus deplete carbon stored in the soil and raising concerns that these might not be a remedy for rising carbon dioxide levels in the atmosphere.

The fungus has been shown to provide a protective effect against heavy metal toxicity when associated with the host Pinus sylvestris, preventing copper accumulation in the needles, and protecting seedlings against cadmium toxicity. Owing to its frequent rate of sexual reproduction and the resulting extensive gene flow within populations, the fungus can rapidly evolve a trait to tolerate otherwise toxic levels of heavy metals in the environment. The genetic basis of this adaptation—intriguing to researchers investigating the bioremediation potential of metal-adapted plants and their fungal associates—are contained in the genome sequence of S. luteus, published in 2015.

Suillus luteus fruit bodies are sometimes infested with larvae, though not nearly as often as S. granulatus or B. edulis. Damage from maggots is much more common in warmer months, and rare late in the season with cooler weather. In a Finnish study, researchers found that 70–95% of fruit bodies collected from typical forest habitats were infested with larvae; the most common species were the flies Mycetophila fungorum, Pegomya deprimata, and Pegohylemyia silvatica. In contrast, other studies have shown that fruit bodies collected from pine plantations are relatively free of larvae. The fungus produces microscopic crystals of oxalic acid at the surface of its hyphae, a feature that is thought to help deter grazing by the springtail species Folsomia candida.

== Edibility ==
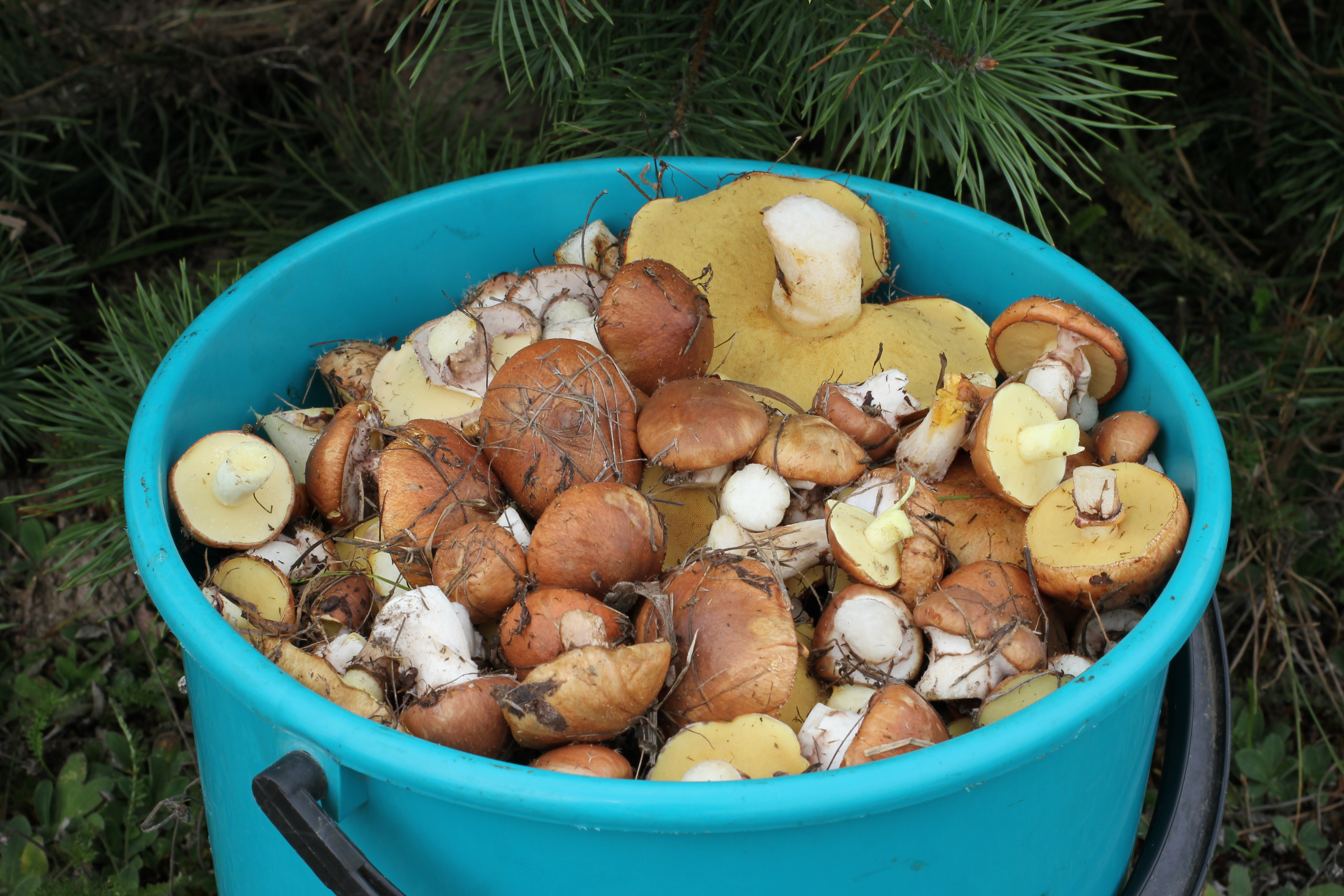
Slippery jack mushrooms collected in Ukraine

Suillus luteus is an edible mushroom, but the slime/pileipellis must be removed. Although some authors regard it as one of low quality, and generally inferior to co-occurring species such as Boletus pinophilus, the species is considered a delicacy in Slavic cultures (known as maslyata in Russian or maslyuky in Ukrainian or maślaki in Polish, deriving from words meaning "buttery"). It was highly regarded in Calabria, even more than Boletus edulis, until the 1940s when increased interest in the latter species eclipsed the former. Mushrooms conforming to Suillus luteus are exported from Chile to Italy, and, since the 1970s, the United States. As of 2002, harvesters in Chile were paid on average US$0.5 per kilogram of fruit bodies.

In Burundi, Suillus luteus mushrooms are sold to Europeans as cepes in Bujumbura but not generally eaten by the Barundi. Based on samples collected from Chile, the boletes contain (as a percentage of dry weight) 20% protein, 57% carbohydrates, 6% fat, and 6% ash. Pinus radiata plantations in southeastern Australia have become tourist attractions as people flock to them in autumn to pick slippery jacks and saffron milk-caps (Lactarius deliciosus); Belanglo State Forest in particular has attracted large numbers of Polish foragers.

Slippery jacks do not keep for long after picking, Zeitmar considers them unsuitable for drying, as their water content is too high. They are suited for frying, or cooking in stews and soups, either alone or with other mushroom species. Puréeing the mushroom is not recommended, however: "We once made the mistake of running it through a blender to make a soup. The result was a substance recommending itself for use when hanging wallpaper." S. luteus and other Suillus species may cause allergic reactions in some people or digestive problems that appear to result from consuming the slimy skin. The fungus is better cooked before eating, and some authors recommend discarding the glutinous cuticle and tubes before cooking. Moreover, the skin can spoil other fungi with which slippery jacks are collected.

Inexpensive powdered S. luteus fruit bodies are sometimes added to the more expensive B. edulis mushroom soup powder, a fraudulent practice that is difficult to detect by microscope because the tissues are no longer intact. This adulteration can be determined chemically, however, by testing for increased levels of the sugar alcohols arabitol and mannitol. The practice can also be determined with a DNA-based method that is sensitive enough to detect the addition of 1–2% of S. luteus to B. edulis powder.

== See also ==
- List of North American boletes
