= Slippery Jack =

Slippery Jack is a name for:

- An Acoustic band from Lawrence, KS
- A species of mushroom, Suillus luteus
- Any mushroom of the genus Suillus
- A character from the children's television show Toad Patrol and Winx Club (mentioned)
