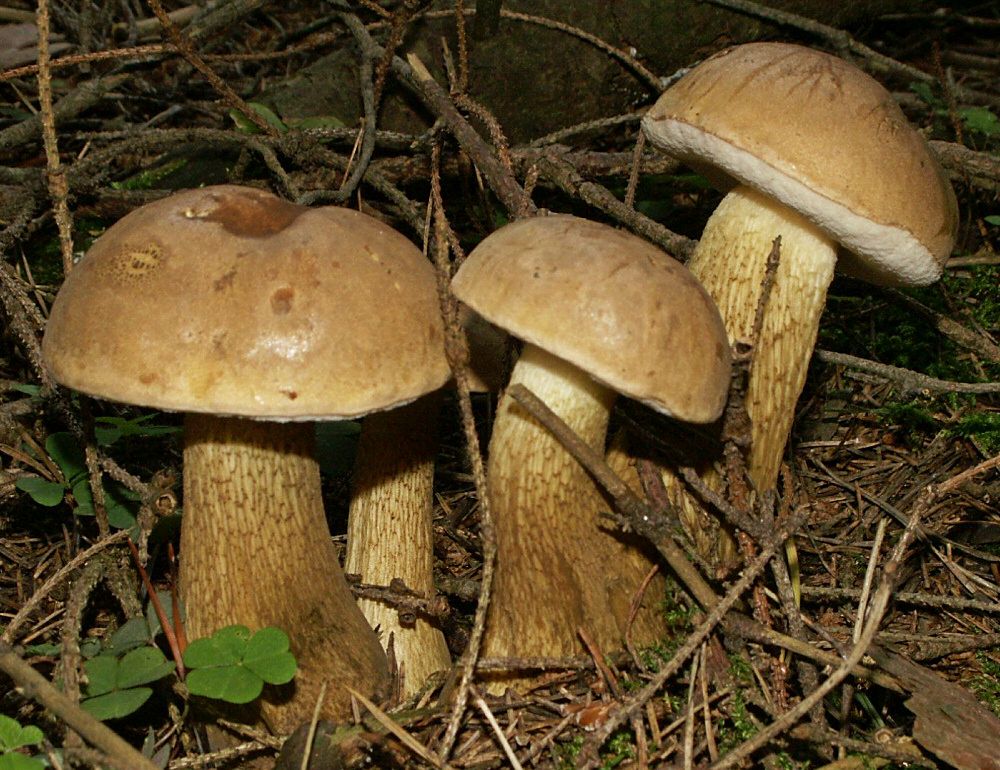

Scientific classification
- Domain: Eukaryota
- Kingdom: Fungi
- Division: Basidiomycota
- Class: Agaricomycetes
- Order: Boletales
- Family: Boletaceae
- Genus: Tylopilus
- Species: T. felleus

Binomial name
- Tylopilus felleus (Bull.) P.Karst. (1881)

Synonyms
- Boletus felleus Bull. (1788); Boletus alutarius Fr. (1815); Boletus alutarius Rostk. (1844); Tylopilus felleus var. alutarius (Fr.) P.Karst. (1882); Dictyopus felleus (Fr.) Quél. (1886); Rhodoporus felleus (Fr.) Quél. (1888); Tylopilus alutarius (Fr.) Henn. (1898); Boletus felleus var. minor Coker & Beers (1943); Tylopilus felleus var. uliginosus A.H.Sm. & Thiers (1971); Tylopilus felleus var. minor (Coker & Beers) Pilát & Dermek (1974)

= Tylopilus felleus =

Species of fungus

Tylopilus felleus Mycological characteristics
- Pores on hymenium
- Cap is convex
- Hymenium is adnate
- Stipe is bare
- Spore print is buff to pink
- Ecology is mycorrhizal
- Edibility is edible, but unpalatable

Tylopilus felleus, commonly known as the bitter bolete or the bitter tylopilus, is a fungus of the bolete family. French mycologist Pierre Bulliard described this species as Boletus felleus in 1788 before it was transferred into the new genus Tylopilus. It is the type species of Tylopilus and the only member of the genus found in Europe.

The fruit bodies have convex to flat caps that are some shade of brown, buff or tan and typically measure up to 15 cm (6 in) in diameter. The pore surface is initially white before turning pinkish with age. Like most boletes it lacks a ring and it may be distinguished from Boletus edulis and other similar species by its unusual pink pores and the prominent dark-brown net-like pattern on its stalk.

Its distribution includes east Asia, Europe and eastern North America, extending south into Mexico and Central America. A mycorrhizal species, it grows in deciduous and coniferous woodland, often fruiting under beech and oak. It has been the subject of research into bioactive compounds that have been tested for antitumour and antibiotic properties. Although not poisonous it is generally considered inedible owing to its overwhelming bitterness.

== Taxonomy ==
The species was first described in the scientific literature as le bolet chicotin (Boletus felleus) by French mycologist Pierre Bulliard in 1788. As the large genus Boletus was carved up into smaller genera, Petter Karsten transferred it in 1881 to Tylopilus, a genus diagnosed by its pink spores and adnate tubes. Tylopilus felleus is the type species of Tylopilus and the only member of the genus found in Europe. Synonyms include Boletus alutarius, described by Elias Magnus Fries in 1815 and later by Friedrich Wilhelm Gottlieb Rostkovius in 1844, and Paul Christoph Hennings's subsequent transfer of Fries's taxon into Tylopilus, T. alutarius. Lucien Quélet placed the taxon in Dictyopus in 1886 and then Rhodoporus in 1888, but neither of these genera are recognised today, the former having been merged into Boletus and the latter into Tylopilus. Genetic analysis published in 2013 shows that T. felleus and many (but not all) other members of Tylopilus form a Tylopilus clade within a larger group informally called anaxoboletus in the Boletineae. Other clades in the group include the porcini and Strobilomyces clades as well as three other groups composed of members of various genera including Xerocomus, Xerocomellus and Boletus badius and relatives.

A variety described from the Great Lakes region, var. uliginosus, was recognised by Alexander H. Smith and Harry D. Thiers in 1971 on the basis of its microscopic features, a distinction supported by Professor C.B. Wolfe of Pennsylvania State University. However Index Fungorum does not consider this an independent taxon. Similarly, Boletus felleus var. minor, published originally by William Chambers Coker and A.H. Beers in 1943 (later transferred to Tylopilus by Albert Pilát and Aurel Dermek in 1974), has been folded into synonymy with T. felleus. Charles Horton Peck described Boletus felleus var. obesus in 1889, but no record of a type specimen exists. Although some records exist of T. felleus in Australia, their spores are of consistently smaller dimensions and this taxon has been classified as a separate species, T. brevisporus.

Tylopilus felleus derives its genus name from the Greek tylos "bump" and pilos "hat" and its specific name from the Latin fel meaning "bile", referring to its bitter taste, similar to bile. The mushroom is commonly known as the "bitter bolete" or the "bitter tylopilus".

== Description ==
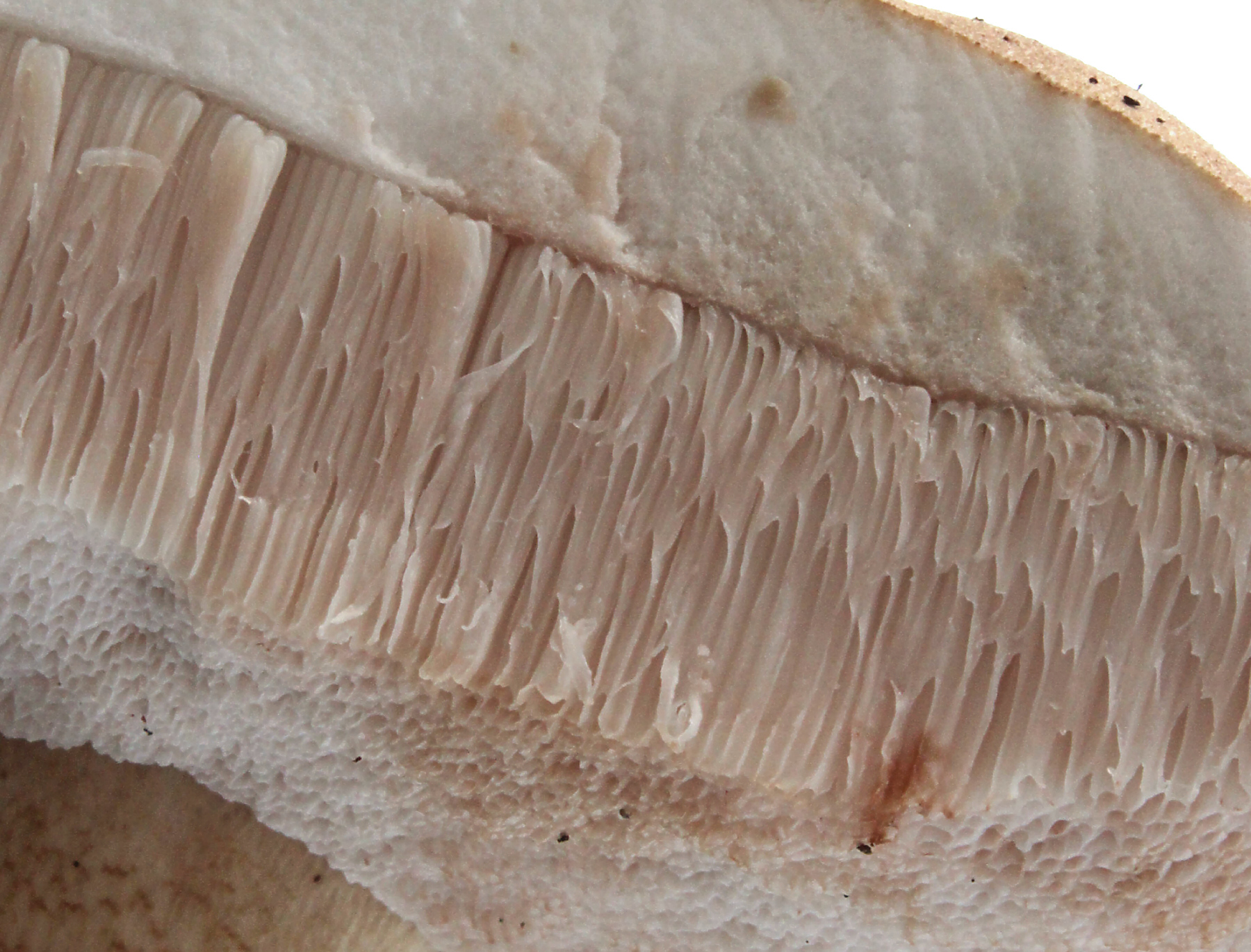
The tubes, initially white when young, become dirty pink in maturity.

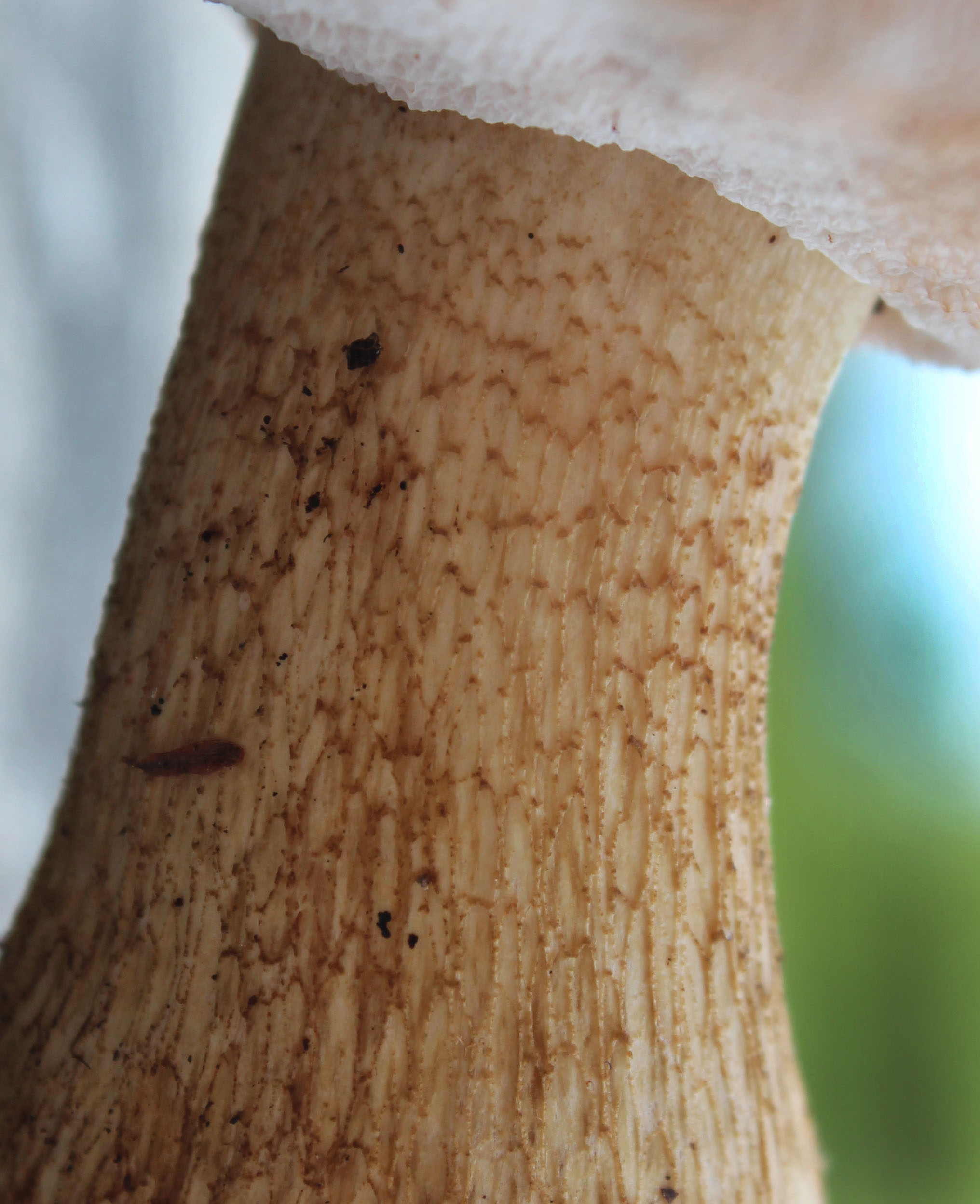
Coarse brown reticulation is characteristic of the stalk surface.

The cap of this species grows up to 15 cm (6 in) in diameter, though some North American specimens reach 30 cm (12 in) across. Grey-yellow to pale- or walnut-brown, it is slightly downy at first and later becomes smooth with a matte lustre. It is initially convex before flattening out with maturity. The cap skin does not peel away from the flesh. The pores underneath are white at first and become pinkish with maturity. They are adnate to the stalk and bulge downwards as the mushroom ages. The pores bruise carmine or brownish, often developing rusty-brown spots with age, and number about one or two per millimetre. The tubes are long relative to the size of the cap, measuring 2–3 cm (0.8–1.2 in) deep in the middle part of the cap. The stalk is initially bulbous before stretching and thinning in the upper part; the lower part of the stalk remains swollen, sometimes shrinking at the base where it attaches to the substrate. It measures 7–10 cm (2.8–3.9 in)—rarely to 20 cm (7.9 in)—tall, and 2–3 cm (0.8–1.2 in) wide, and can bulge out to 6 cm (2.4 in) across at the base. It is lighter in colour than the cap, and covered with a coarse brown network of markings, which have been likened to fishnet stockings in appearance. Described as "very appetising" in appearance, the flesh is white or creamy, and pink beneath the cap cuticle; the flesh can also develop pinkish tones where it has been cut. It has a slight smell, which has been described as pleasant, as well as faintly unpleasant. The flesh is softer than that of other boletes, and tends to become more spongy as the mushroom matures. It is intensely bitter and rarely infested by insects.

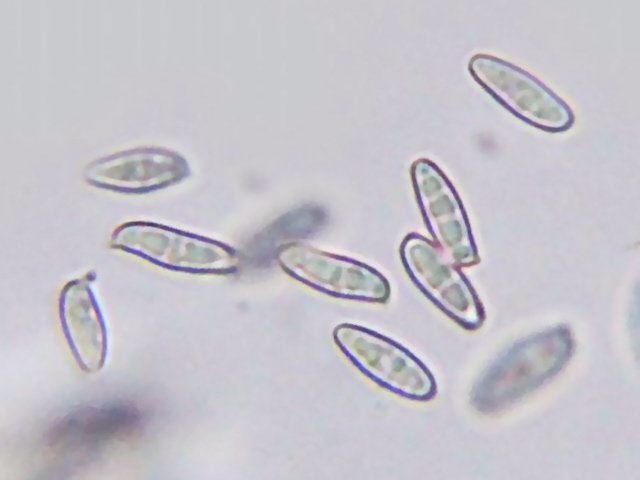
Spores seen with light microscopy

The colour of the spore print is brownish with a reddish or pink tint. Spores are somewhat fuse-shaped, smooth, and measure 11–17 by 3–5 μm. The basidia (spore-bearing cells) are club-shaped, four-spored, and measure 18–25.6 by 7.0–10.2 μm. Cystidia on the walls of the tubes (pleurocystidia) are fuse-shaped with a central swelling, thin-walled, and have granular contents. They possess sharp to tapered tips, and have overall dimensions of 36–44 by 8.0–11.0 μm. On the pore edges, the cheilocystidia are similar in shape to the pleurocystidia, measuring 24.8–44.0 by 7.3–11.0 μm. The hymenium of Smith and Thiers's variety uliginosus, when mounted in Melzer's reagent, shows reddish globules of pigment measuring 2–8 μm that appear in the hyphae and throughout the hymenium, and a large (8–12 μm) globule in the pleurocystidia.

Several chemical tests have been documented that can help confirm the identify of this species. On the cap flesh, application of formaldehyde turns the tissue pinkish, iron salts result in a colour change to greyish-green, aniline causes a lavender to reddish-brown colour, and phenol a purplish pink to reddish brown. On the cap cuticle, nitric acid causes an orange-salmon colour, sulphuric acid creates orange-red, ammonia usually makes brown, and a potassium hydroxide solution usually makes orange.

=== Similar species ===
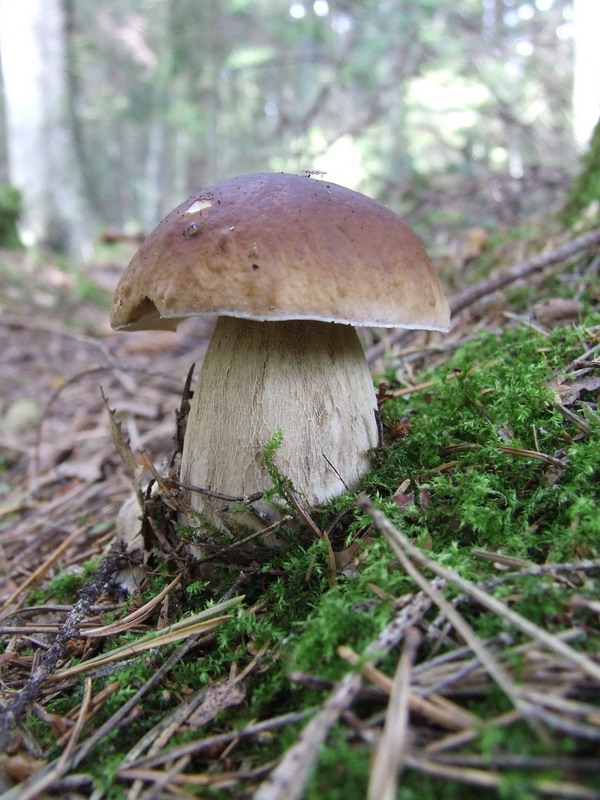
Boletus edulis

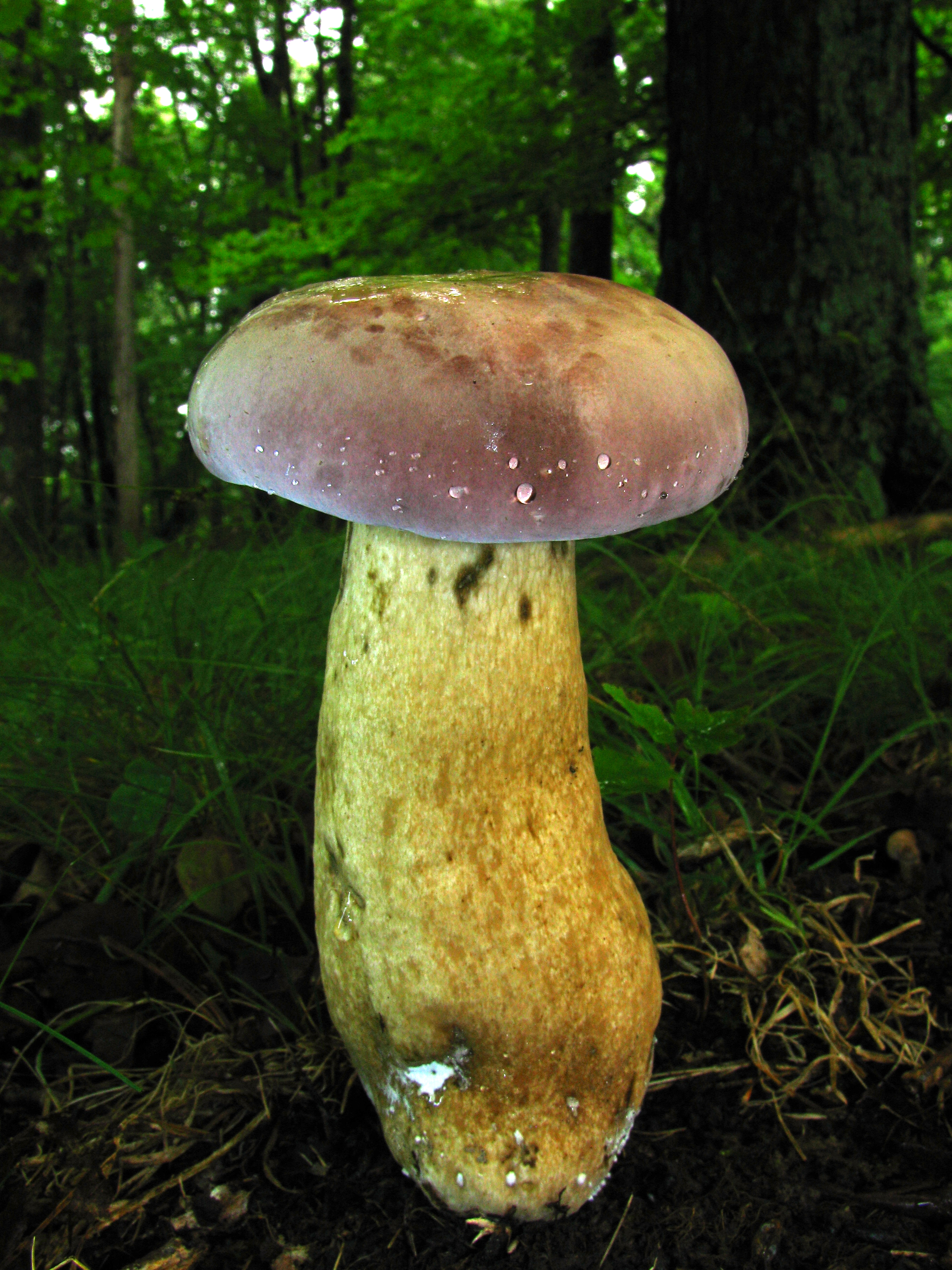
Tylopilus rubrobrunneus

Italian cook and author Antonio Carluccio reports this is one of the most common fungi brought to him to identify, having been mistaken for an edible species. Young specimens can be confused with many edible boletes, though as the pores become more pink the species becomes easier to identify. Some guidebooks advocate tasting the flesh, the smallest piece of which will be very bitter. The dark-on-light reticulation in the stalk is distinctive and is the opposite colouration to that on the stalk of the prized Boletus edulis. T. felleus is found in the same habitat as B. badius, though the latter's yellow tubes and blue-bruising flesh easily distinguish these very dissimilar species. B. subtomentosus may have a similar-coloured cap but its yellow pores and slender stalk aid identification.

Tylopilus rubrobrunneus, found in hardwood forests of eastern North America, is similar in appearance to T. felleus but has a purplish to purple-brown cap. It is also inedible owing to its bitter taste. Another North American species, T. variobrunneus, has a cap that is reddish-brown to chestnut-brown, with olive tones in youth. It has shorter spores than T. felleus, typically measuring 9–13 by 3–4.5 μm. In the field it can be distinguished from the latter species by its mild to slightly bitter taste. T. rhoadsiae, found in the southeastern United States, has a lighter-coloured cap which is smaller, up to 9 cm (3.5 in) in diameter. The edible T. indecisus and T. ferrugineus can be confused with T. felleus but have less reticulated stalks. The dimensions of the spores of the Australian species T. brevisporus range from 9.2 to 10.5 by 3.5 to 3.9 μm. T. neofelleus, limited in distribution to deciduous forests of China, New Guinea, Japan and Taiwan, can be distinguished from T. felleus macroscopically by its vinaceous-brown cap and pinkish-brown to vinaceous stalk and microscopically by its smaller spores (measuring 11–14 by 4–5 μm) and longer pleurocystidia (49–107 by 14–24 μm).

== Ecology, distribution and habitat ==
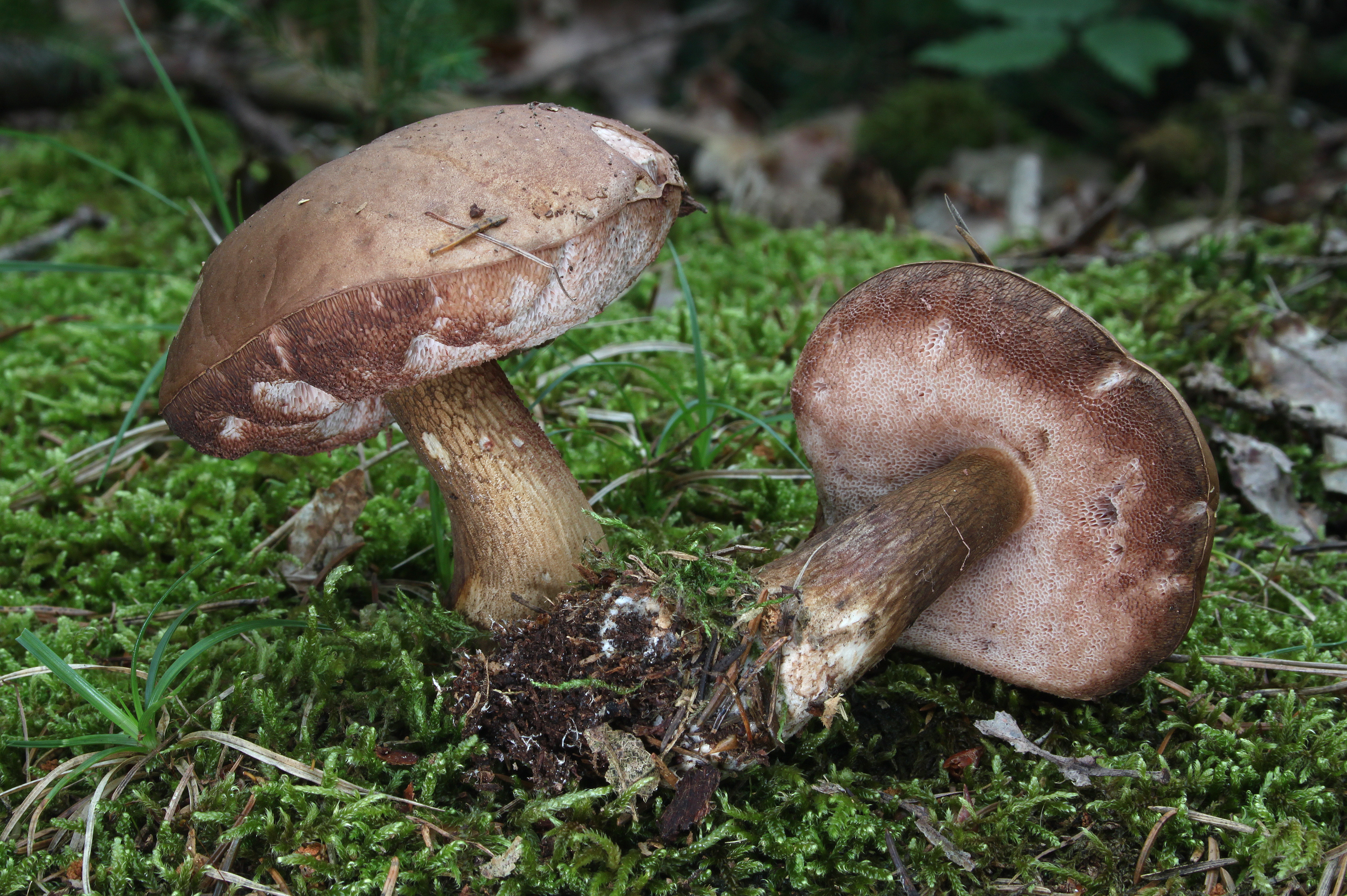
In maturity, the pores often bruise brownish, while the pore surface bulges downward.

Like all Tylopilus species, T. felleus is mycorrhizal. It is found in deciduous and coniferous woodland, often under beech and oak in well-drained acid soils, which can be sandy, gravelly or peaty. If encountered on calcareous (chalky) soil, it will be in moist areas that have become waterlogged and have ample leaf litter. Fruit bodies grow singly or in small groups, and occasionally in small clusters with two or three joined at the base of the stem. Fruit bodies have also been growing in the cavities of old trees, on old conifer stumps, or on buried rotten wood. The fungus obtains most of its nitrogen requirements from amino acids derived from the breakdown of proteins, although a lesser amount is obtained from the amino sugar glucosamine (a breakdown product of chitin, a major component of fungal cell walls). The mycorrhizal plant partner benefits from the fungus's ability to use these forms of nitrogen, which are often abundant in the forest floor. Fruit bodies appear over summer and autumn, anytime from June to October or even November, in many of the northern temperate zones. Large numbers may appear in some years and none in others, generally proportional to the amount of rainfall. Variety uliginosus, known from Michigan, grows among lichens and mosses under pines.

In North America it is known from eastern Canada, south to Florida and west to Minnesota in the United States and into Mexico and Central America. Its European distribution is widespread; it is relatively common in many regions but rare or almost absent in others. In Asia it has been recorded from the vicinity of Dashkin in the Astore District of northern Pakistan and as far east as China, where it has been recorded from Hebei, Jiangsu, Fujian, Guangdong and Sichuan provinces, and Korea.

The strong taste of the fruit body may have some role in insects avoiding it. The small fly species Megaselia pygmaeoides feeds on and infests the fruit bodies of T. felleus in North America though it seems to prefer other boletes in Europe. Fruit bodies can be parasitized by the mould Sepedonium ampullosporum. Infection results in necrosis of the mushroom tissue and a yellow colour caused by the formation of large amounts of pigmented aleurioconidia (single-celled conidia produced by extrusion from the conidiophores).

The bacterium Paenibacillus tylopili has been isolated from the mycorrhizosphere of T. felleus; this is the region around its subterranean hyphae where nutrients released from the fungus affect the activity of the microbial population in the soil. The bacterium excretes enzymes that allow it to break down the biomolecule chitin.

Fruit bodies of T. felleus have a high capacity to accumulate radioactive caesium (^{137}Cs) from contaminated soil, a characteristic attributed to the deep soil penetration achieved by the mycelium. In contrast the species has a limited capacity to accumulate the radioactive isotope ^{210}Po.

== Edibility ==
Even when cooking, it smells terrific, but one taste of the Bitter Bolete would not only disappoint but perhaps depress the novice mushroom hunter.

— Edible Wild Mushrooms of North America:
A Field-To-Kitchen Guide

As its common name suggests, it is extremely bitter, though not toxic as such. This bitterness is worsened by cooking. One specimen can foul the taste of a whole meal prepared with mushrooms. Despite this it is sold in markets (tianguis) in Mexico. A local recipe from France, Romania and East Germany calls for stewing it in skimmed milk, after which it can be eaten or powdered and used for flavouring. The mushroom is not bitter for those who lack genetic sensitivity to bitter taste, a trait endowed by the gene TAS2R38 (taste receptor 2 member 38). The compound responsible for the bitter taste has not been identified.

== Research ==
The mycelium of Tylopilus felleus can be grown in axenic culture, on agar containing growth medium. The fungus can form fruit bodies if the temperature is suitable and the light conditions simulate a 12-hour day. The mushrooms are usually deformed, often lacking stalks so that the cap grows on the surface direct and the caps are usually 0.5–1.0 cm (0.2–0.4 in) in diameter. There are few Boletaceae species known to fruit in culture since ectomycorrhizal fungi tend to not fruit when separated from their host plant.

Compounds from T. felleus have been extracted and researched for potential medical uses. Tylopilan is a beta-glucan that was isolated from the fruit bodies in 1988 and shown in laboratory tests to have cytotoxic properties and to stimulate non-specific immunological response. In particular it enhances phagocytosis, the process by which macrophages and granulocytes engulf and digest foreign bacteria. In experiments on mice with tumour cells it appeared to have antitumour effects when administered in combination with a preparation of Cutibacterium acnes in a 1994 Polish study. Researchers in 2004 reported that extracts of the fruit body inhibit the enzyme pancreatic lipase; it was the second most inhibitory of 100 mushrooms they tested. A compound present in the mushroom, N-γ-glutamyl boletine, has mild antibacterial activity.

== See also ==
- Boletus rubripes – the red-stemmed bitter bolete
- List of North American boletes
