= Tylopilus brevisporus =

Scientific classification
- Domain: Eukaryota
- Kingdom: Fungi
- Division: Basidiomycota
- Class: Agaricomycetes
- Order: Boletales
- Family: Boletaceae
- Genus: Tylopilus
- Species: T. brevisporus

Binomial name
- Tylopilus brevisporus Watling & T.H.Li (1999)

Species of fungus

Tylopilus brevisporus is a bolete fungus found in Australia. It is similar in appearance to Tylopilus felleus, but is distinguishable from that species by its smaller spores.
