= Suillus borealis =

Scientific classification
- Domain: Eukaryota
- Kingdom: Fungi
- Division: Basidiomycota
- Class: Agaricomycetes
- Order: Boletales
- Family: Suillaceae
- Genus: Suillus
- Species: S. borealis

Binomial name
- Suillus borealis A.H.Sm., Thiers & O.K.Mill. (1965)

Species of fungus

Suillus borealis is a species of bolete fungus in the family Suillaceae. Found in western North America where it associates with western white pine (Pinus monticola), the fungus was described as new to science in 1965 by mycologists Alexander H. Smith, Harry Delbert Thiers, and Orson K. Miller. It is similar in appearance to Suillus luteus, but unlike in that species, the partial veil does not form a ring on the stipe.

The species is considered to be an excellent edible mushroom.

== See also ==
- List of North American boletes
