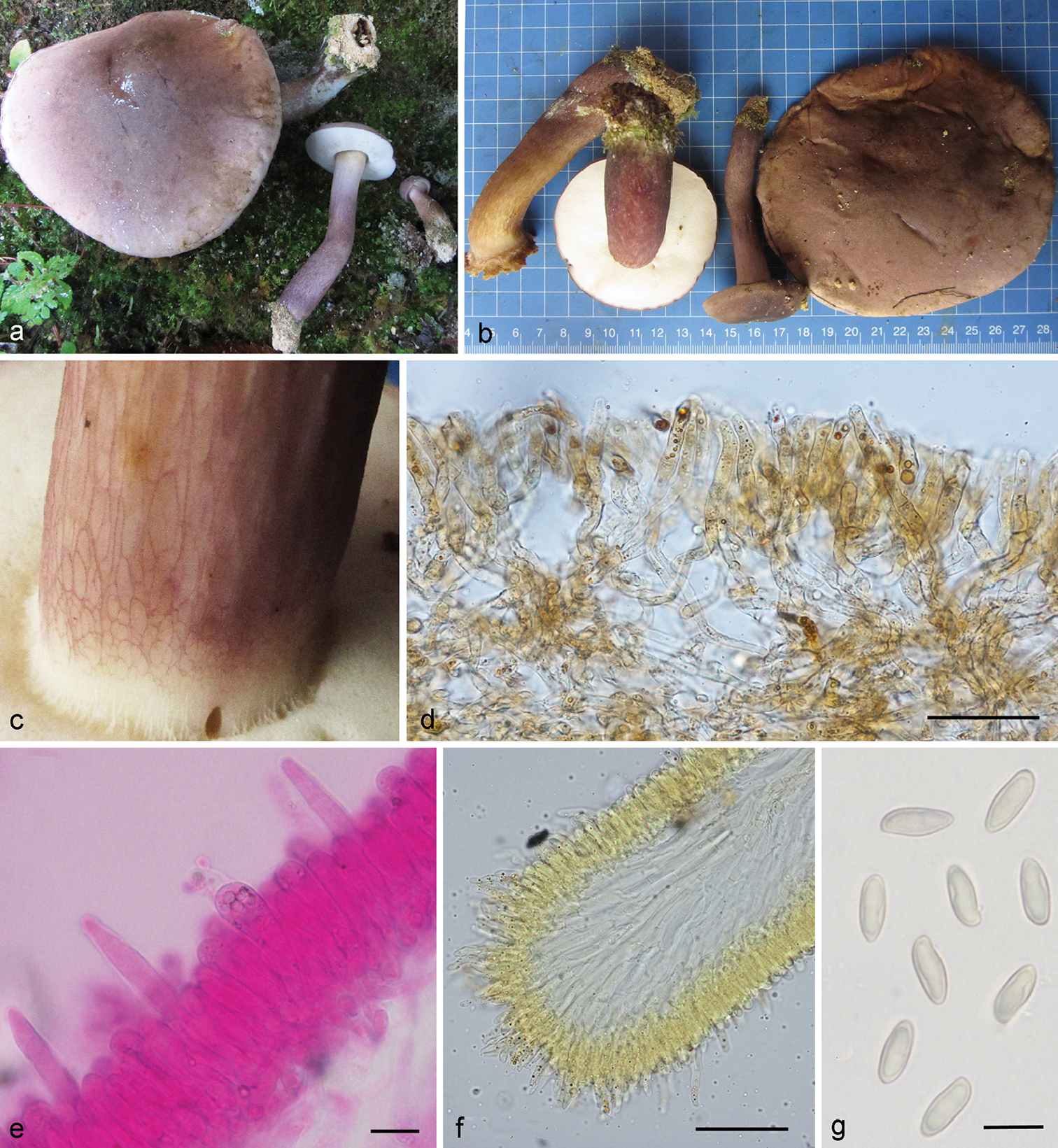

Scientific classification
- Kingdom: Fungi
- Division: Basidiomycota
- Class: Agaricomycetes
- Order: Boletales
- Family: Boletaceae
- Genus: Tylopilus
- Species: T. neofelleus

Binomial name
- Tylopilus neofelleus Hongo (1967)

= Tylopilus neofelleus =

Species of fungus

Tylopilus neofelleus is a bolete fungus found in Sichuan and Yunnan provinces of China, Taiwan, Japan, and New Guinea. It is similar in appearance to Tylopilus felleus, but is distinguishable from that species by its smaller spores.
