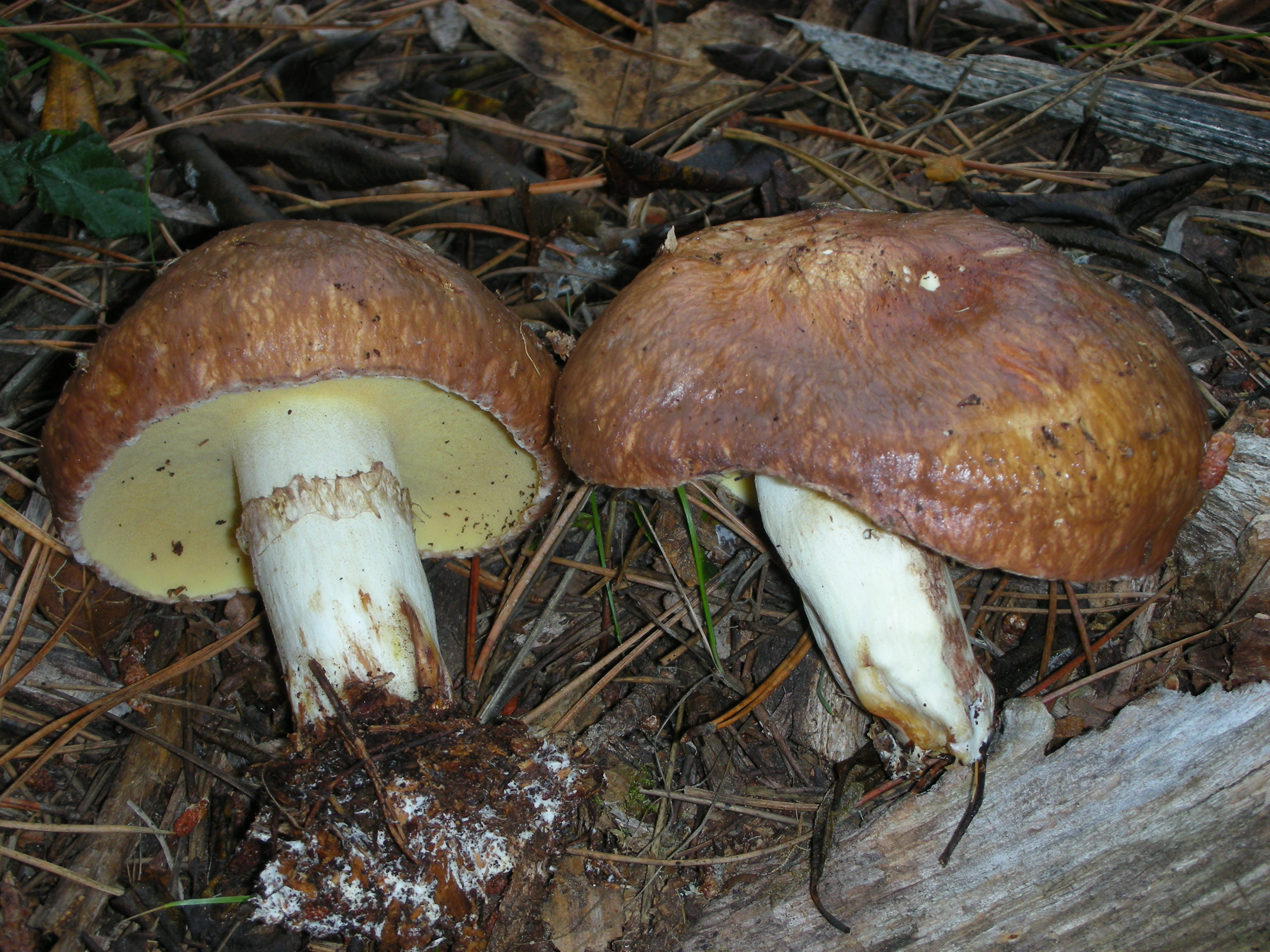

Conservation status
- Least Concern (IUCN 3.1)

Scientific classification
- Kingdom: Fungi
- Division: Basidiomycota
- Class: Agaricomycetes
- Order: Boletales
- Family: Suillaceae
- Genus: Suillus
- Species: S. pseudobrevipes

Binomial name
- Suillus pseudobrevipes A.H. Sm. & Thiers

= Suillus pseudobrevipes =

Species of fungus

Suillus pseudobrevipes Mycological characteristics
- Pores on hymenium
- Cap is convex
- Stipe is bare
- Spore print is brown
- Ecology is mycorrhizal
- Edibility is edible

Suillus pseudobrevipes, commonly known as the veiled short-stemmed slippery jack, is a species of fungus in the genus Suillus. It was first described scientifically by American mycologists Harry D. Thiers and Alexander H. Smith in 1964.

The cap is 5–15 centimetres (2–6 in) wide and tannish, darkening with age; the margin may have whitish veil remnants. The pores are yellow and the spore print is brown. The stalk is up to 8 cm long and 3 cm thick. A fibrillous annulus is usually present.

It is distributed in North America under pine trees. The fruit body is edible.

== See also ==
- List of North American boletes
- Suillus brevipes
