= Dashkin =

Village in Astore, Pakistan

Coordinates: 35°29′N 74°46′E

Dashkin is a village in Astore, Pakistan. It is 85 km from Gilgit, the capital of Gilgit-Baltistan. It has over 5,000 inhabitants, primarily farmers and herdsmen.

The area is rich in gemstones and is home to a number of rare species of wildlife, such as the Astor markhor (a subspecies of markhor) and the snow leopard. Dofana Mountain and several forests are nearby. Hunting permits are available.

In 2003, the International Union of Nature Conservation launched a pilot to test the concept of community-based forest management in the Dashkin–Mushkin–Tarbuling Forest as part of the Mountain Areas Conservancy Project, an initiative aimed at sustaining biodiversity in Karakoram-Hindu Kush in the western Himalayan mountains in northern Pakistan.
