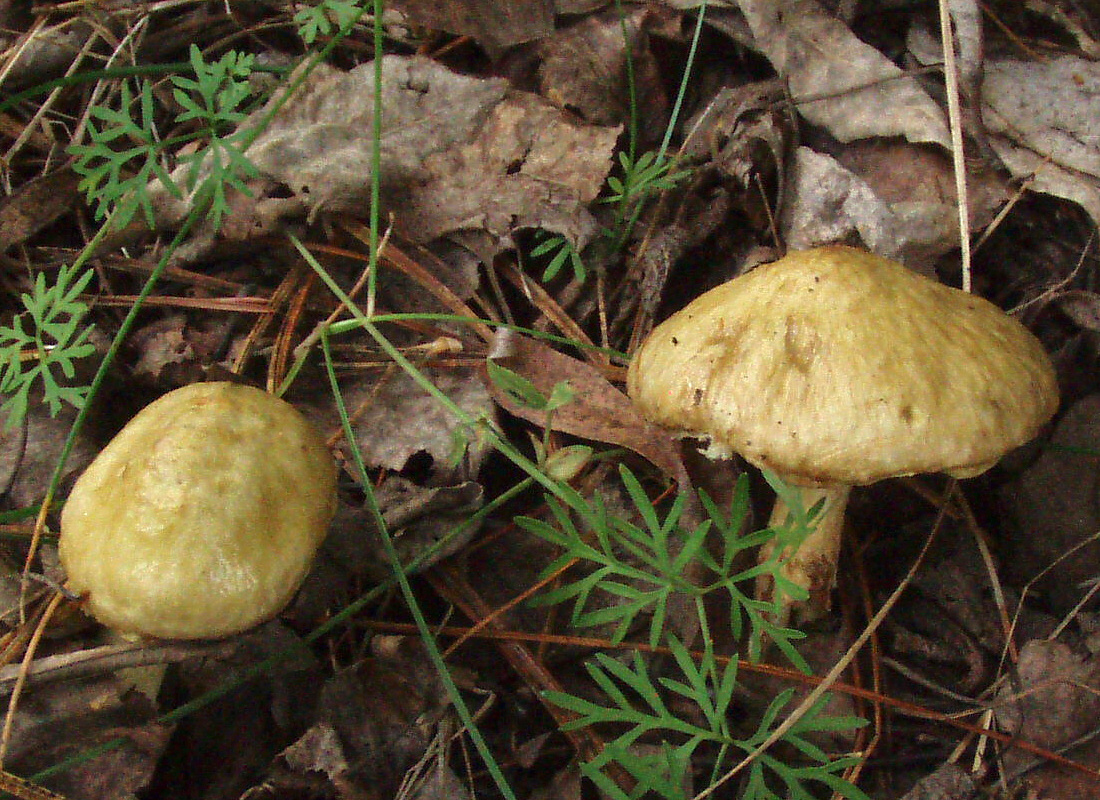

Scientific classification
- Kingdom: Fungi
- Division: Basidiomycota
- Class: Agaricomycetes
- Order: Boletales
- Family: Suillaceae
- Genus: Suillus
- Species: S. sibiricus

Binomial name
- Suillus sibiricus (Singer) Singer (1945)

Synonyms
- Ixocomus sibiricus Singer (1938); Boletus sibiricus (Singer) A.H.Sm. (1949)

= Suillus sibiricus =

Species of fungus

Suillus sibiricus is a mushroom-forming fungus in the family Suillaceae. In North America, it is commonly called the Siberian slippery jack. Phylogenetic analysis has shown that S. sibiricus is closely related to S. umbonatus and S. americanus, and may in fact be conspecific with the latter species.

The fruit bodies have slimy caps in wet weather, which can reach diameters of up to 10 cm (3.9 in). On the underside of the cap are yellow angular pores that bruise a pinkish to cinnamon colour. The stem is up to 8 cm (3.1 in) tall and 2.5 cm (1.0 in) wide and typically has a ring, a remnant of the partial veil that covers the fruit body in its early development.

It is found in mountains of Europe, North America, and Siberia, strictly associated with several species of pine tree. Due to its specific habitat and rarity in Europe, it has been selected for inclusion in several regional Red Lists.

== Taxonomy ==
- - S. umbonatus (Western North America)
  - - S. sibiricus (USA-Arizona)
    - - S. americanus (USA-Michigan)
      - S. sibiricus (Nepal)
      - S. sibiricus (China-Jilin)
      - S. sibiricus (China-Yunnan)

Possible phylogenetic relationships of S. sibiricus and related species with an eastern Asian/eastern North American disjunct distribution.

The species was first described scientifically under the name Ixocomus sibiricus by American mycologist Rolf Singer in 1938, based on material that was collected under Pinus cembra var. sibirica in the Altai Mountains of central Asia. In 1945, he transferred it to Suillus. Alexander H. Smith called the species Boletus sibiricus in 1949, but this is today considered a synonym. Singer named the subspecies S. sibiricus subsp. helveticus in 1951, based on material collected by Jules Favre from Switzerland in 1945. Roy Watling later considered this a nomen nudum—not published with an adequate description, and therefore failing to qualify as a formal scientific name.

According to Singer's 1986 arrangement, S. sibiricus is classified in the subsection Latiporini of section Suillus in the genus Suillus. Section Suillus includes species with glandular dots on the stem, and a partial veil which becomes appendiculate on the cap edge. Characteristics of species in subsection Latiporini include cinnamon-coloured spore prints without an olive tinge, and wide pores on the underside of the cap (wider than 1 mm when mature). Other species in the subsection include S. flavidus, S. umbonatus, S. punctatipes, and S. americanus.

A phylogenetic analysis of various eastern Asian and eastern North American disjunct Suillus species revealed that S. sibiricus forms a well-supported clade with S. americanus and S. umbonatus; these relationships are corroborated by a previous analysis (1996), which used a larger sampling of Suillus species to determine taxonomic relationships in the genus. Within this clade, S. umbonatus and U.S. S. sibiricus can be separated from the rest of the group. However, the phylogenetic relationships among the tested isolates determined from different methods of analysis are not always consistent and could not be established with confidence. In general, there is little phylogenetic divergence detected in this clade.

Suillus sibiricus
- Mycological characteristics
- Pores on hymenium
- Cap is convex or flat
- Hymenium is adnate or decurrent
- Stipe has a ring or is bare
- Spore print is brown
- Ecology is mycorrhizal
- Edibility is edible or can cause allergic reactions

== Description ==
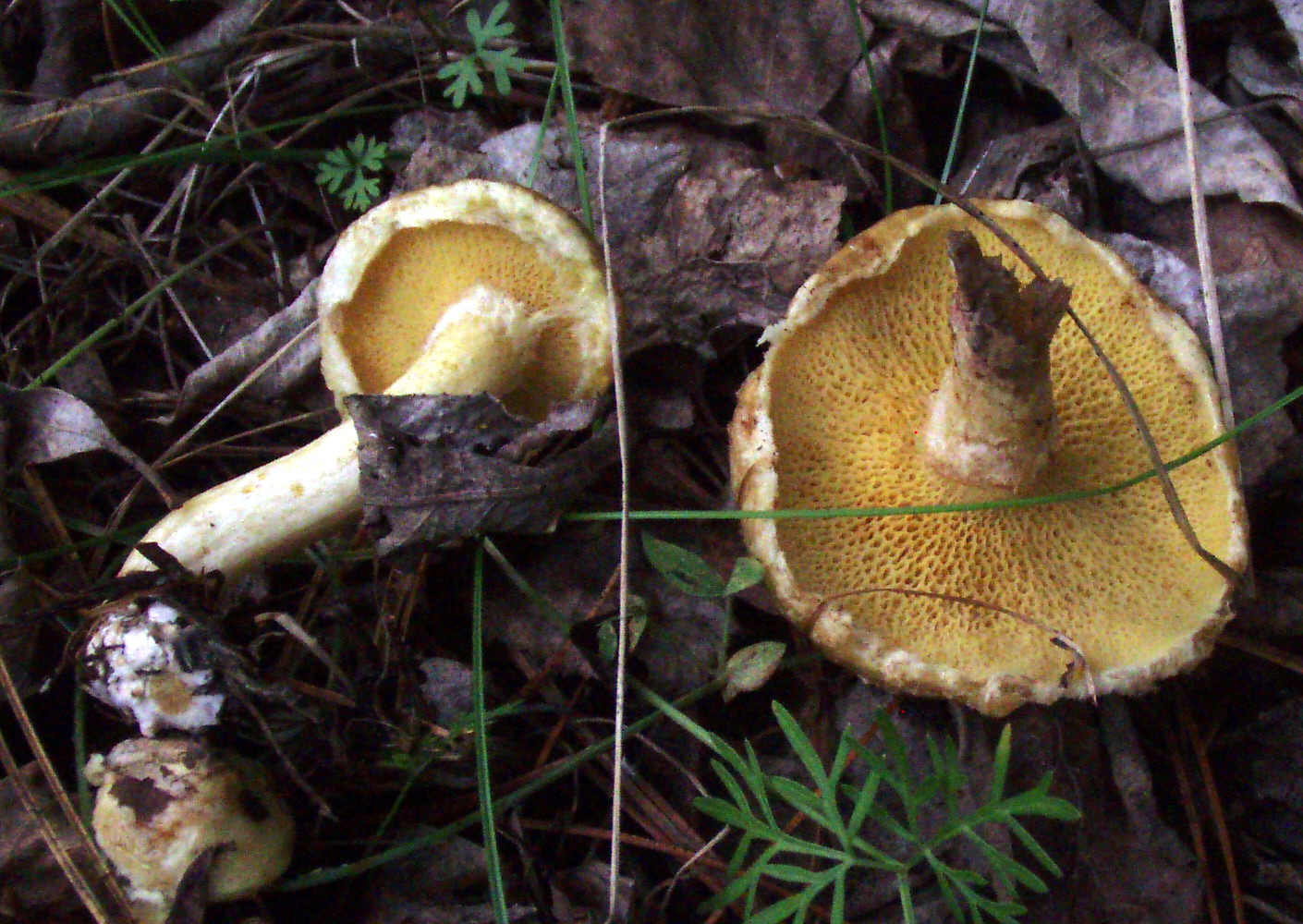
The angular pores are greater than 1 mm wide.

The fruit body of Suillus sibiricus is a medium-sized bolete. The cap is at first hemispherical and straw yellow, but expands with maturity and finally flattens out becoming darker with reddish brown spots or fibrils. The cap diameter is up to 10 cm (3.9 in). The cap cuticle is mucilaginous especially when moist and can be peeled off. A partial veil extends from the stem to the cap periphery in immature specimens. In mature specimens, it is obliterated leaving a felty ring around the stem and fragments hanging from the cap periphery. The tubes are initially yellow but become brown, adnate or slightly decurrent. The pores are angular, wider than 1 mm in diameter and the same colour as the tubes but stain dirty pink or vinaceous when bruised. The tubes that make up the pores are 7 to 10 mm (0.3 to 0.4 in) long. Droplets can be present and these leave dark brown spots after drying out.

The stem is cylindrical, up to 8 cm (3.1 in) tall and 2.5 cm (1.0 in) wide. It is yellow, becoming pink to red towards the base and covered throughout with granules which become darker as the fruit body matures. The partial veil, and later ring, is cottony, off-white and attached to the top third stem. Because the ring is fugacious (short-lived) it is not always present; it is thought that fruit bodies that develop in dry conditions are less likely to have a ring. The flesh is pale yellow and stains red-brown when bruised. At first firm, with maturity it becomes increasingly soft. The spore deposit is coloured brown. The spores are ellipsoid, sized 9–12 by 3.8–4.5 μm, thin-walled, and smooth when seen through a microscope. The basidia (spore-bearing cells) are club-shaped, four-spored, and measure 22–34 by 5–8 μm. The flesh reddens and then blackens when potassium hydroxide solution is applied. With iron(II) sulfate solution, the flesh slowly discolours to grey.

=== Similar species ===
In North America, Suillus americanus has a similar appearance, but a more easterly distribution. It is associated with eastern white pine. Although some authors have tried to distinguish between the two with by using width of the stem, or by differences in fruit body colouration, it is acknowledged that these characteristics are variable, and depend on environmental factors. The phylogenetic analysis of Wu and colleagues (2000) suggests that the two taxa may be the same, although more samples from different geographical areas will be needed to verify this.

== Distribution and habitat ==
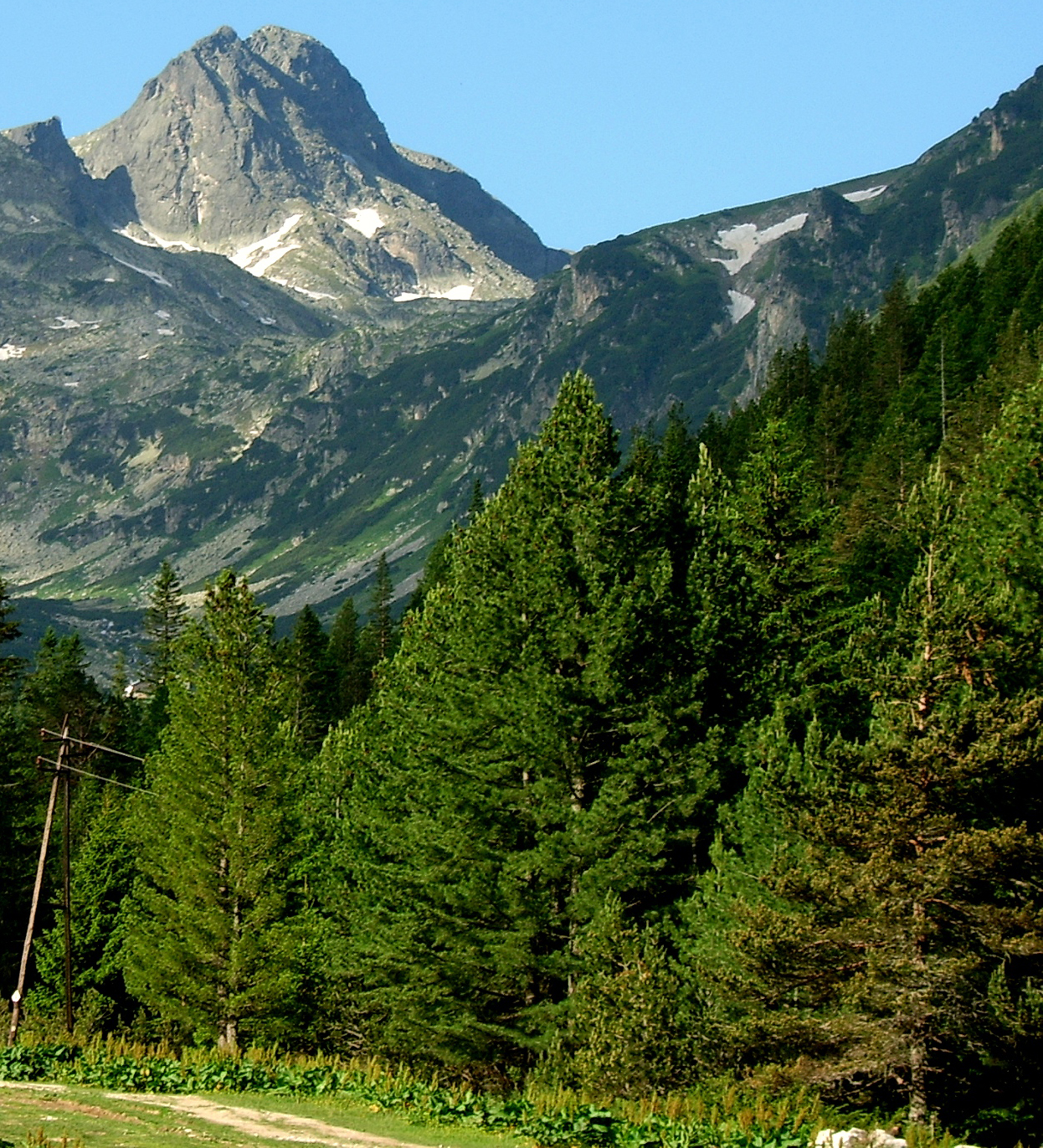
Typical habitat of Suillus sibiricus in Europe with Macedonian pine. Rila mountain, Bulgaria

Suillus sibiricus has been recorded in parts of Europe, North America and Siberia. The fungus forms strict ectomycorrhizal associations with pines of the subgenus Strobus. These include Swiss pine (Pinus cembra) in the Alps and Tatras of central Europe, Macedonian pine (P. peuce) in the Balkans, western white pine (P. monticola) and limber pine (P. flexilis) in the Pacific Northwest of North America, P. banksiana in Quebec, Canada, and Siberian pine (P. sibirica) and Siberian dwarf pine (P. pumila) in Siberia and the Russian Far East. The range of the fungus is hence limited by the distribution of the host tree. S. sibiricus has also been shown to be able to form ectomycorrhizae with the Himalayan species P. wallichiana in pure culture conditions in the laboratory.

The fungus is rare in Europe and its distribution typically corresponds with high elevations at or near the alpine tree line. It is found in at least 11 countries, (Note: European countries in which S. sibiricus is found include Austria, Bulgaria, Czech Republic, France, Germany, Italy, Macedonia, Montenegro, Poland, Slovakia and Switzerland.) and has been included in the Red List of 8 countries. (Note: European countries in which S. sibiricus is red listed or protected include Austria, Bulgaria, France, Germany, Macedonia (preliminary Red List), Montenegro (protected but not red listed), Poland, Slovakia and Switzerland.) It is considered critically endangered in the Czech Republic. The European Council for Conservation of Fungi (ECCF) has suggested Suillus sibiricus be listed in Appendix II of the Bern Convention. Factors that threaten the habitat of S. sibiricus include deforestation and construction of skiing pistes and other infrastructure for winter sports.

The fungus fruits in summer and autumn in Europe, and in western North America where it often occurs abundantly. The North American distribution extends south to Nuevo Leon, Mexico.

== Edibility ==
Suillus sibiricus is reportedly edible, but it is without any commercial or culinary value. It is one of over 200 species of mushrooms frequently collected for consumption in Nepal. Its taste has been described variously by authors as sour (Europe) and not distinctive or slightly bitter (North America). Its odour is not distinctive. It can cause allergic reactions.

== See also ==
- List of North American boletes
