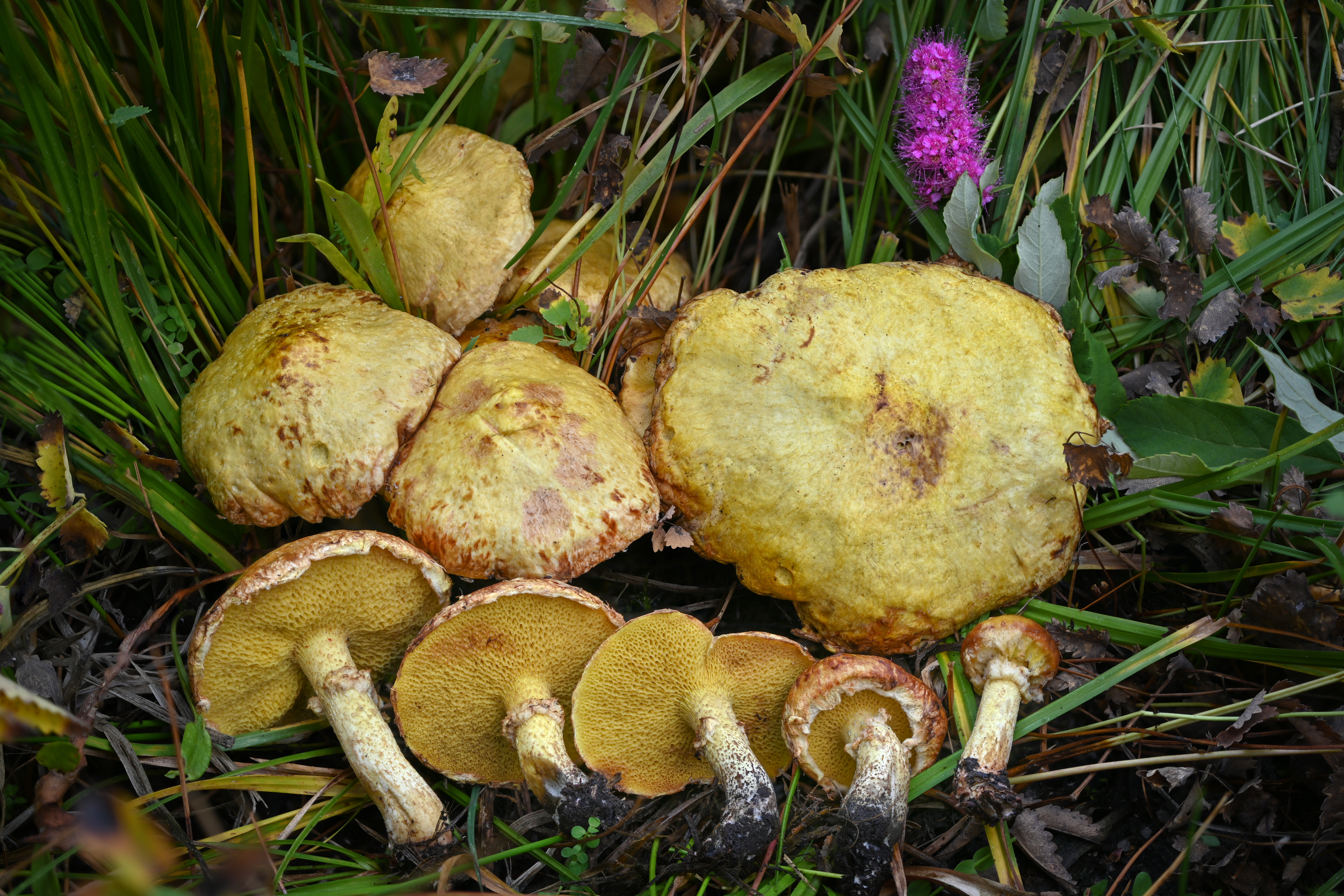

Conservation status
- Least Concern (IUCN 3.1)

Scientific classification
- Kingdom: Fungi
- Division: Basidiomycota
- Class: Agaricomycetes
- Order: Boletales
- Family: Suillaceae
- Genus: Suillus
- Species: S. americanus

Binomial name
- Suillus americanus (Peck) Snell (1959)

Synonyms
- Boletus americanus Peck (1887); Ixocomus americanus (Peck) E.-J.Gilbert (1931)

= Suillus americanus =

Species of fungus

Suillus americanus
- Mycological characteristics
- Pores on hymenium
- Cap is convex or flat
- Hymenium is adnate or decurrent
- Stipe is bare
- Spore print is brown
- Ecology is mycorrhizal
- Edibility is edible

Suillus americanus is a species of mushroom-forming fungus in the family Suillaceae. Commonly known as the chicken fat mushroom and the American suillus, it produces bright yellow, often slimy caps marked with red to reddish-brown scales, a pore surface of large yellow angular pores that can stain brownish when bruised, and a slender yellow stipe dotted with darker glandular spots. The species was first described in the late 19th century by the American mycologist Charles Horton Peck and later transferred to Suillus. It closely resembles S. sibiricus, and DNA-based studies have led some authors to treat the two names as referring to a single, wide-ranging species complex, with several regional variants recognized at infraspecific rank.

Suillus americanus is an ectomycorrhizal fungus that forms symbiotic associations with pines, best known in North America from eastern white pine (Pinus strobus). Fruiting bodies appear on the ground, singly or in clusters, most often from late summer into autumn, and records based on collections and DNA sequencing indicate a broader Northern Hemisphere distribution than was once assumed, including parts of East Asia and the Balkan Peninsula. Greenhouse experiments suggest strong host filtering during spore germination, and competition studies indicate it can colonize pine seedlings readily and dominate some other pine-associated Suillus species. The mushroom is edible but often considered mediocre because of its slimy texture, and some people develop contact dermatitis after handling it; laboratory work has also identified a beta glucan with anti-inflammatory activity. Although assessed as Least Concern globally, it has been treated as threatened or legally protected in parts of southeastern Europe where it occurs with scattered high-elevation five-needle pine forests.

== Taxonomy ==
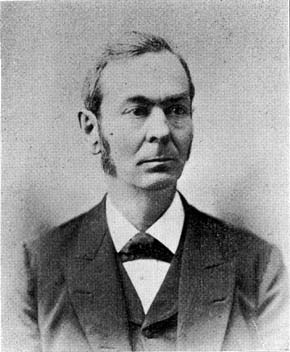
Charles Horton Peck

Suillus americanus was first described scientifically by American mycologist Charles Horton Peck in 1888, based on specimens he had originally collected as far back as 1869, in New York state, near Sand Lake, Albany, and Port Jefferson. In his 1888 publication he indicated that he had originally listed these collections as Boletus flavidus (now known as Suillus flavidus) in his 1869 Report of the State Botanist (published in 1872). However, as was pointed out nearly a century later in 1986, the 1869 report does not actually mention the species; rather, Peck's field notes that year (which served as the basis for the report) reference a collection at Sand Lake upon which the original (1888) description was most likely based. Because Peck failed to designate a type specimen, one of the Sand Lake specimens was lectotypified in 1986.

In 1931, French mycologist Édouard-Jean Gilbert transferred the species to the genus Ixocomus, a now-defunct taxon that has since been subsumed into Suillus. In 1959, Walter H. Snell, collaborating with Rolf Singer and Esther A. Dick, transferred the species to Suillus. In his 1986 version of the authoritative monograph The Agaricales in Modern Taxonomy, Singer included the species in the subsection Latiporini of genus Suillus, an infrageneric grouping (below the taxonomic level of genus) characterized by a cinnamon-colored spore print without an olive tinge, and wide pores, typically greater than 1 mm when mature.

Because several Suillus species have overlapping macroscopic and microscopic characters, later authors have increasingly relied on DNA barcoding to verify identifications. In a re-examination of Korean herbarium material using internal transcribed spacer (ITS) DNA sequences alongside morphology, Min and colleagues found that misidentifications were common in Suillus collections, and that microscopic measurements (spores, basidia, and cystidia) were generally not diagnostic among the Korean species they assessed.

Common names for the species include the American slipperycap, the American suillus, or the chicken-fat mushroom. The latter name is a reference to its yellow color. The specific epithet americanus means "of America".

Studies using molecular phylogenetics have altered how some authors define the limits of Suillus americanus. In a global analysis of ITS barcode sequences (the standard DNA marker used for identifying fungi), Nguyen and colleagues found that collections identified as S. americanus and S. sibiricus form a single, widely distributed lineage across North America and Eurasia, with little internal genetic structure; they therefore supported treating S. sibiricus as the same species and retaining the older name S. americanus. They also placed the recently described Himalayan taxon S. himalayensis within the genetic and morphological variation of S. americanus. Nguyen and colleagues also noted that several infraspecific names have been applied to this species (two varieties and three forms), which they interpreted as expected morphological variants in a taxon with a very wide range; these variants were not readily separable using ITS sequences alone. In a world-wide identification key of Suillus, Wolfgang Klofac treated S. sibiricus as an infraspecific taxon of S. americanus, publishing the combinations S. americanus f. sibiricus and S. americanus f. helveticus and noting that reported macroscopic and microscopic differences between S. americanus and S. sibiricus are slight. He also cautioned that North American collections filed under the name "S. sibiricus" required further study, because the name has been applied inconsistently and distribution records can be distorted by misidentifications.

Subsequent nomenclatural work has treated several regional variants as infraspecific forms within S. americanus, including western North American material long reported as "S. sibiricus". The 2025 IUCN Red List assessment follows this interpretation and summarises the two-name history. Subsequent nomenclatural work formalized some of this variation by describing Suillus americanus f. pseudosibiricus for western North American material previously misidentified as "S. sibiricus", based on both morphology and placement within a distinct ITS subclade of the S. americanus complex.

== Description ==
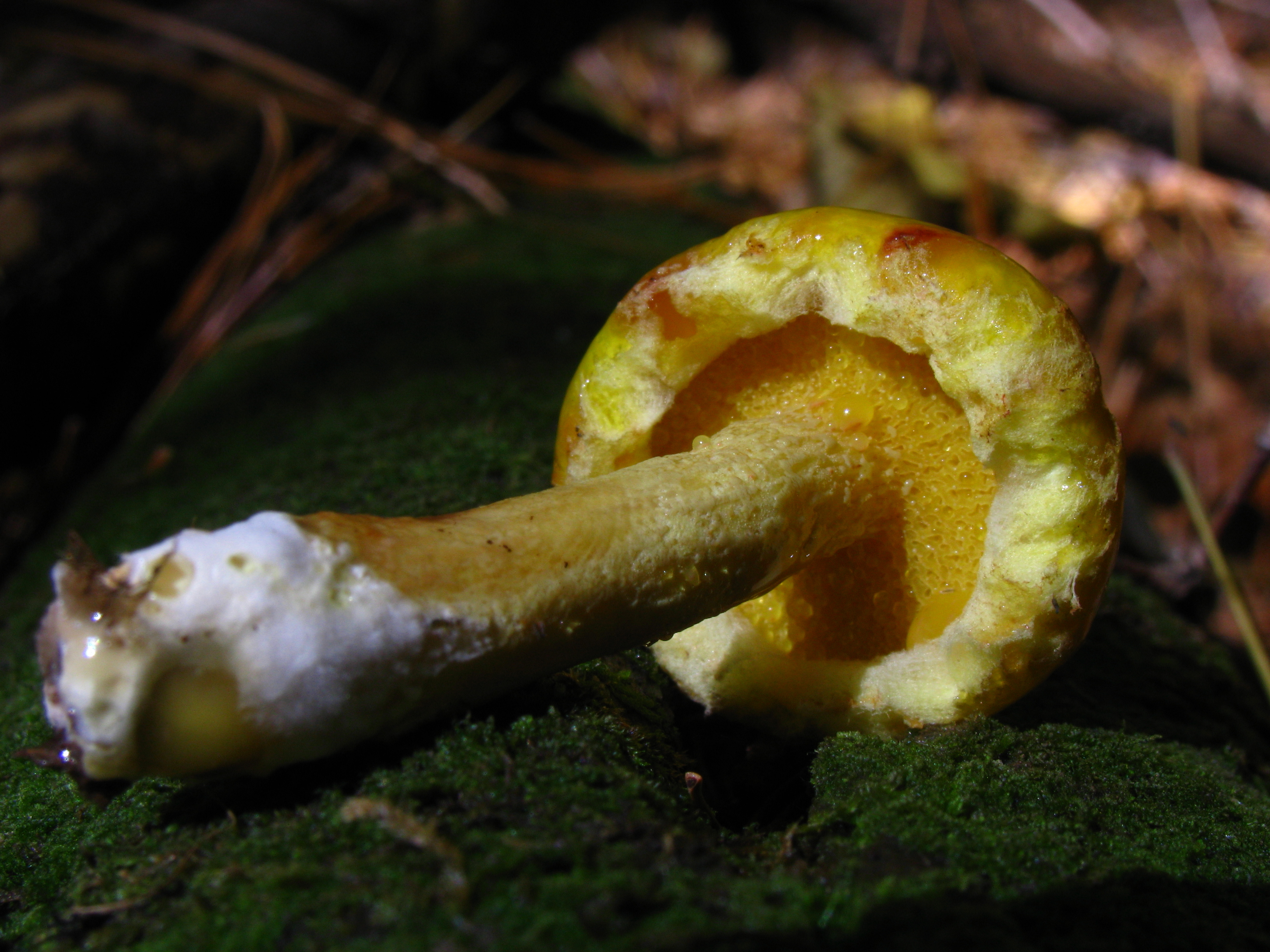
Young specimens have an inrolled margin, and remnants of a yellowish, cottony veil.

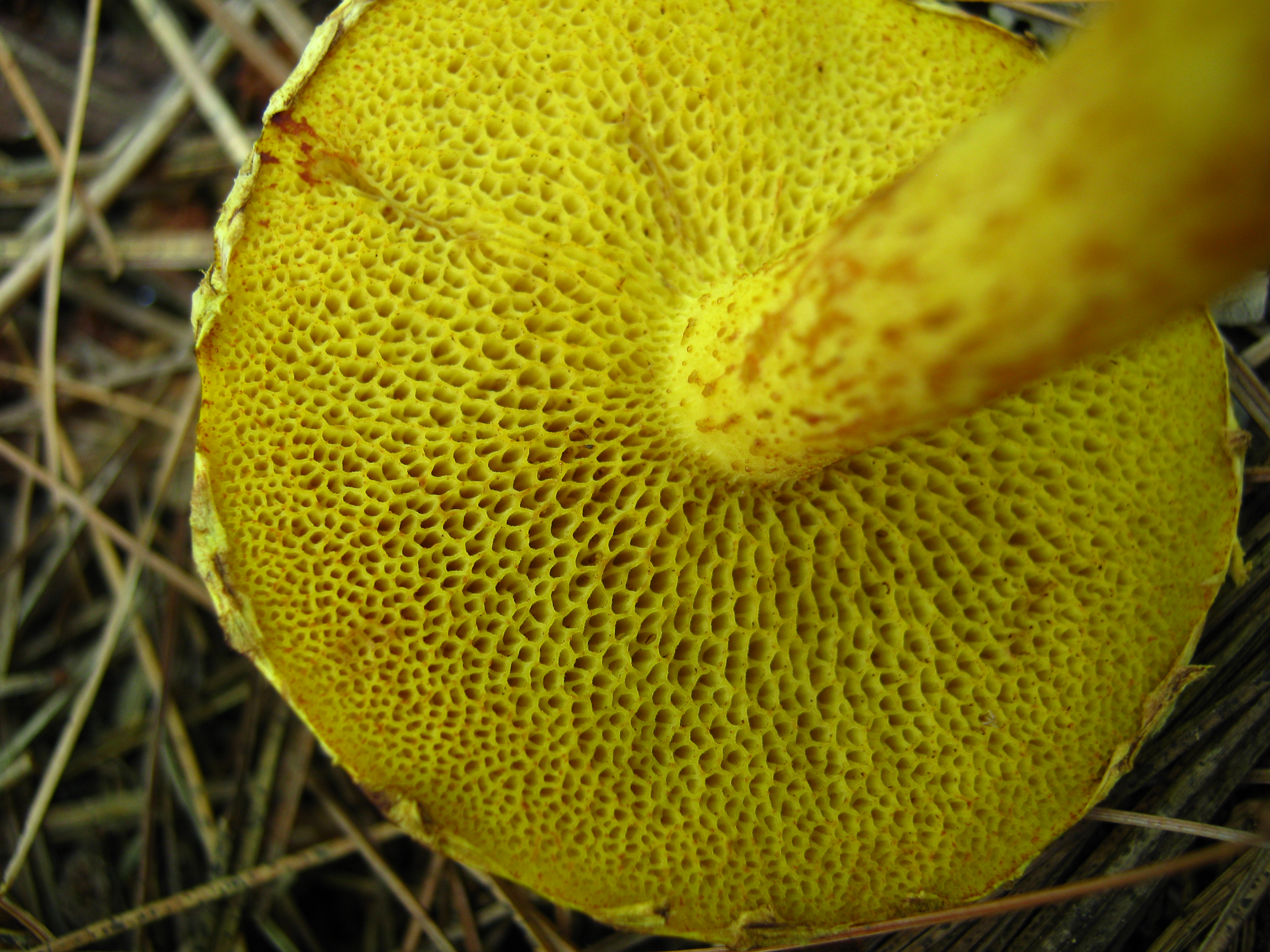
The yellow pores are angular, and 1–2 mm in diameter.

The cap is typically between 3–10 cm (1 1/4–4 in) in diameter, broadly convex with a small umbo to flat with age. The margin is curved inwards in young specimens, and may have remnants of a yellowish, cottony veil hanging from it. The cap surface is colored bright yellow with red or brownish streaks and hairy patches. When the fruit body is young and moist, the surface is slimy; as the cap matures and dries out, it becomes sticky or tacky.

The tubes which comprise the pore layer on the underside of the cap are 0.4 to 0.6 cm (1/8 to 1/4 in) deep, and have an adnate (attached broadly to the stipe) to decurrent (running down the length of the stipe) attachment to the stipe. They are yellow, and stain reddish-brown when bruised. The yellow pores are large (1–2 mm diameter) and angular, and tend to become darker as they age. The pores are slightly wider than long, so that there are about 9–10 pores per cm measured radially, but 12 to 13 per cm when measured tangentially, about halfway to the edge. As is the case with all boletes, spores form on the inner surfaces of the tubes and sift through their openings to be borne away on the air currents outside.

The stipe is 3–9 cm (1 1/8–3 1/2 in) by 0.4–1 cm (1/8–3/8 in), roughly equal in width throughout, often crooked, and becomes hollow with age. The color of the stipe surface is lemon yellow, and it is covered with glandular dots that bruise if handled. The partial veil is not attached to the stipe, and usually does not leave a ring on the stipe. A whitish mycelium present at the base of the stipe helps anchor the fruit body in the substrate. The flesh is mustard yellow, and stains pinkish-brown when cut or bruised.

=== Microscopic characteristics ===
In deposit, the spores are cinnamon-colored. Viewed with a microscope, they are pale yellow, smooth, and roughly elliptical in shape, and measure 8–9.5 by 3.5–5 μm. The basidia, the spore-bearing cells, are club-shaped and 4-spored, with dimensions of 21–25 by 5.5 to 6 μm. The pleurocystidia (cystidia found on the sides of a gill) range in shape from cylindrical to club-shaped and are arranged in bundles. Both the bases of the bundles and the surface of the cystidia may be covered with brown pigment particles. Cheilocystidia are cystidia located in the gill faces. In S. americanus, they are mostly club-shaped, often with an expanded apex, and like the pleurocystidia, are arranged in bundles, with brown pigment particles at the base of the bundles. Bundles of cystidia near the tube openings may sometimes be visible with a hand lens. Like all Suillus species, the cystidia of S. americanus will turn orange-brown in the presence of a solution of 3% potassium hydroxide. The slimy layer on the cap surface results from an interwoven layer of gelatinous hyphae that are typically 3–5 μm thick.

=== Similar species ===
Suillus americanus is very similar in appearance to Suillus sibiricus (distributed in western North America and western and central Asia) but the latter species associates with Pinus monticola and Pinus flexilis rather than Pinus strobus. One field guide suggests that S. sibiricus has a thicker stipe than S. americanus, brown spots on the cap, and is a darker, more dingy yellow. Molecular phylogenetics analysis has shown, however, that specimens of S. sibricus collected from China and western North America, as well as S. americanus from eastern North America, are most likely "a single circumboreal taxon". A regional example of this confusion comes from South Korea: when Korean collections labelled as S. sibiricus were sequenced, all available material grouped with S. americanus instead. The authors noted that separating the two on appearance alone can be difficult, and recommended combining macroscopic characters with ITS sequence data when a confident identification is needed. Later treatments have questioned how reliable these host-based distinctions are, noting that S. americanus and S. sibiricus differ only weakly in morphology and that host association has often been overemphasized in Suillus identification.

Another lookalike species is Suillus subaureus, which can be distinguished microscopically by slightly smaller, hyaline (translucent) spores (typically 7.5–8.5 by 3 μm), and an association with Populus tremuloides (quaking aspen).

== Habitat and distribution ==
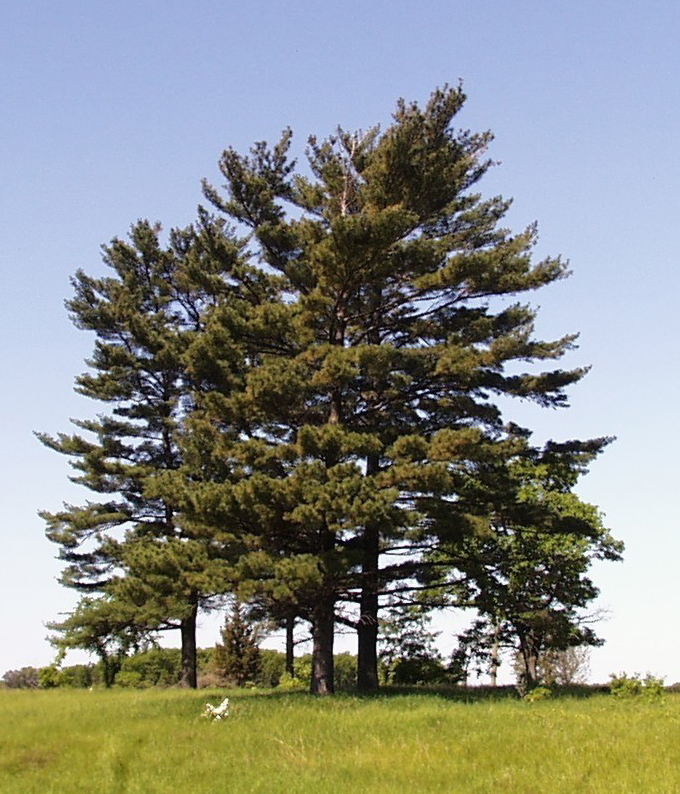
S. americanus is associated with eastern white pine.

Suillus americanus fruits on the ground, singly or in clusters, throughout northeastern North America north into Canada, typically in late summer and autumn. Its North American distribution extends south to Guerrero, Mexico. It has also been reported from Guangdong, China, an occurrence once treated as disjunct, although broader sampling of ITS DNA sequences has since suggested a much wider Northern Hemisphere distribution than older records alone implied. Fruit bodies may appear in relatively dry weather when other mushrooms are scarce.

In South Korea, voucher specimens collected between 1988 and 2013 and held in several national collections were confirmed as S. americanus using ITS sequences. Specimens previously reported or filed under other names (including S. sibiricus, S. tomentosus, and S. subluteus) were re-identified, leading the authors to conclude that Korean records of those taxa could not be verified from the available material. In a global compilation of ITS sequences, S. americanus was represented from both North America and a broad Eurasian range extending from Eastern Europe through Pakistan and India to Russia and Japan, and was interpreted as the most naturally widespread species in the genus.

In southeastern Europe, the species has been recorded from high-altitude forests of Macedonian pine (Pinus peuce) in Montenegro. In a DNA metabarcoding survey of fungi inhabiting P. peuce rootlets and rhizosphere soil, S. americanus (treated in that study as conspecific with S. sibiricus) was repeatedly detected and was among the more frequently recovered ectomycorrhizal taxa in rootlet samples; the same study also reported the species as listed as protected in several Balkan countries, including North Macedonia, Bulgaria, and Montenegro. Additional Balkan field records from Montenegro (including Prokletije National Park) have mainly come from montane to subalpine conifer forests with P. peuce at about 1,400–1,900 m elevation, with fruiting reported from early summer into late autumn. In Bulgaria, a three-year survey of macrofungi in P. peuce forests and plantations combined morphology with nrITS barcoding and included sequenced Bulgarian collections deposited in GenBank.

Suillus americanus is a mycorrhizal species: it forms an ectomycorrhizal sheath around pine roots and a Hartig net between the outer root cells, exchanging soil-derived nutrients for carbohydrates produced by the host. It is best known in North America from association with eastern white pine (Pinus strobus). South Korean collections were likewise linked with P. strobus, with fruiting reported from late summer into autumn.

== Ecology ==
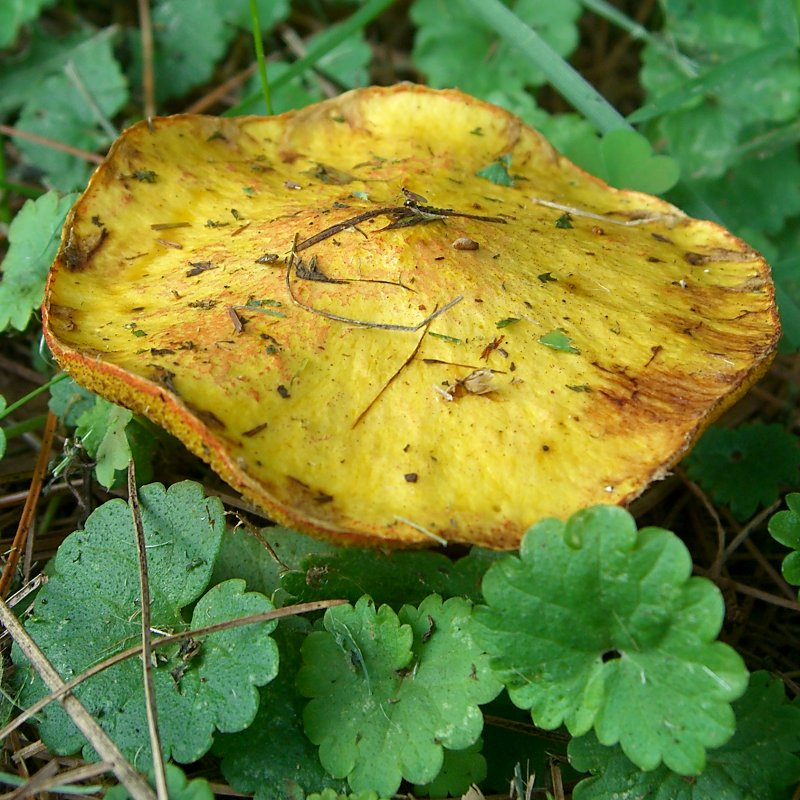
In the Smoky Mountains, Southern Appalachians

Greenhouse bioassays suggest that host identity strongly constrains the earliest stage of symbiosis in Suillus americanus. In spore-inoculation trials, the fungus readily formed ectomycorrhizas on eastern white pine (Pinus strobus), colonizing roughly one-third of examined root tips, but it failed to form ectomycorrhizas on tamarack (Larix laricina) or northern red oak (Quercus rubra). When seedlings were co-planted, S. americanus still colonized Pinus consistently and only occasionally formed ectomycorrhizas on Larix (interpreted as mycelial spread from nearby colonized pine roots), while oak roots remained uncolonized. The authors interpreted this pattern as strong host specificity during spore germination, with limited capacity for secondary associations via established mycelial networks.

In a controlled seedling bioassay using eastern white pine (Pinus strobus), Suillus americanus colonized seedlings readily from spores and tended to dominate in competition with other white pine-associated Suillus species. When seedlings were inoculated with spores of S. americanus alone or in paired combinations with S. subaureus or S. spraguei, the authors found a consistent competitive ranking (S. americanus > S. subaureus > S. spraguei) and interpreted the outcome largely as a timing effect, with earlier and more consistent colonization favoring S. americanus. In single-species treatments, seedling dry biomass did not differ significantly among the three fungi, but some two-species inoculations reduced biomass relative to single-fungus treatments, consistent with the idea that competition among ectomycorrhizal fungi can influence host performance as well as which fungi dominate colonized root tips.

Field observations from Macedonian pine stands in Bulgaria suggest that tree age may influence how often S. americanus fruits. Although it occurred in only some monitored plots, it was frequently observed fruiting beneath seedlings of Pinus peuce outside plot boundaries; the authors suggested this pattern is consistent with suilloid fungi being important during pine establishment and regeneration.

== Conservation ==
Although Suillus americanus is assessed as a least-concern species globally, it has been treated as threatened in parts of southeastern Europe where it occurs with scattered high-elevation five-needle pine forests. A regional account noted that it has been proposed as a candidate for Appendix II of the Bern Convention, is protected by national law in Montenegro and has been assessed there as critically endangered, and has also been treated as threatened in neighboring Balkan countries (vulnerable in North Macedonia and endangered in Bulgaria).

== Edibility & allergenicity ==
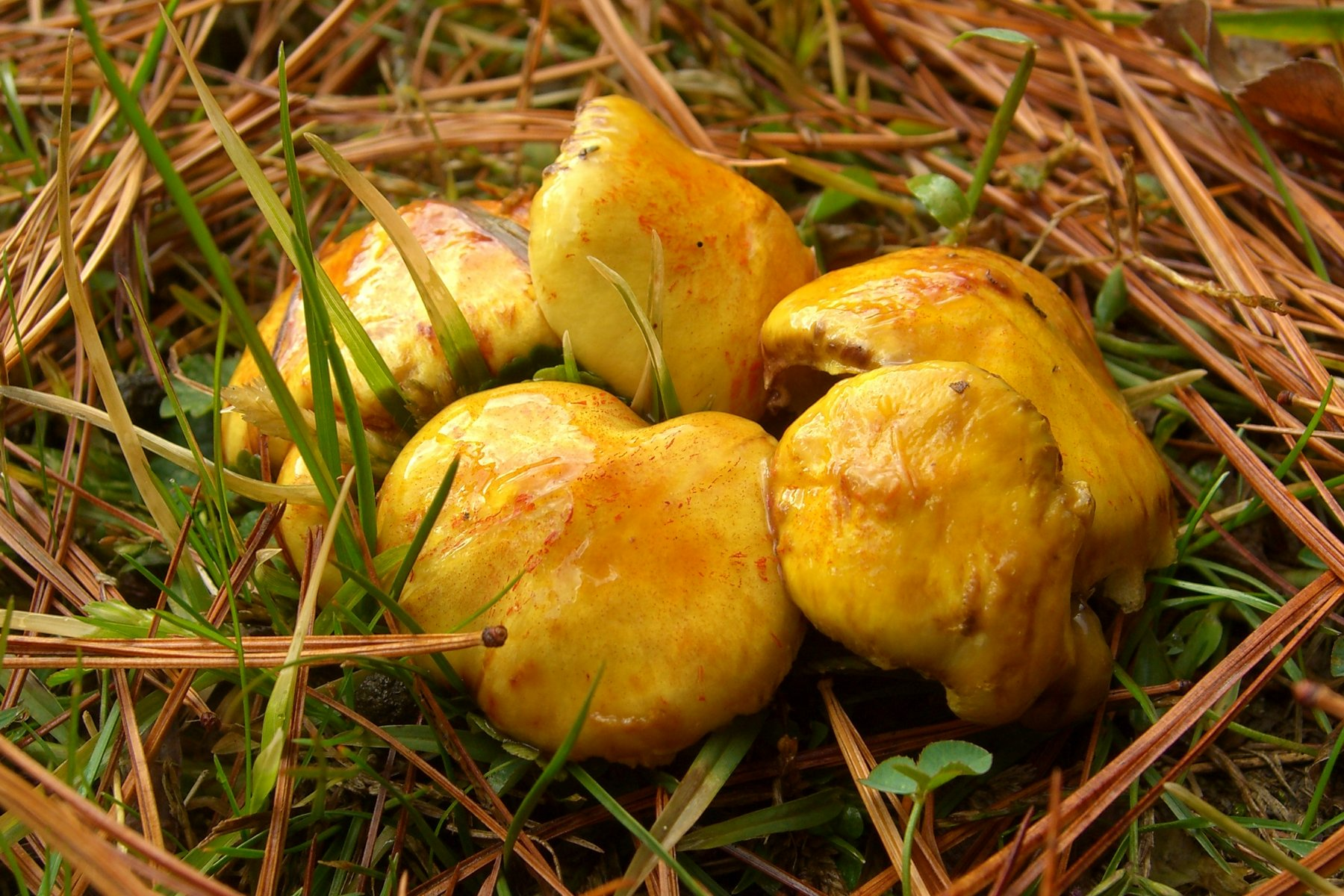
Suillus americanus is edible.

This species is nonpoisonous and sometimes regarded as edible, but opinions about its palatibility are mixed. It has no odor and its taste has been reported as mild. One field guide suggests it has a "distinctive lemony tang", and another says, "The yellow cap may remind you of chicken fat; it has a wonderfully savory mushroom flavor". The slimy texture of the mushroom has been compared to okra. One cookbook author suggests that the mushroom is ideal for spreads, for use on bread or as a dip; baking the fruit bodies in an oven will dry them for future use, and concentrate the flavor. The slimy caps and the pore layer are typically removed before consumption. Another field guide mentions that the "thin flesh hardly make this species worthwhile."

Some susceptible individuals have experienced an allergic reaction after touching S. americanus. The symptoms of allergic contact dermatitis generally develop one to two days after initial contact, persist for roughly a week, then disappear without treatment. Cooking the fruit bodies inactivates the responsible allergens.

== Bioactive compounds ==
Suillus americanus contains a polysaccharide known as a beta glucan that laboratory tests suggest may have anti-inflammatory activity. Known specifically as a (1→3)-, (1→4)-β-D-glucan, its natural function is as a component of the fungal cell wall, where it forms microcrystalline fibrils in the wall that give it rigidity and strength. The anti-inflammatory activity results from the polysaccharide's ability to inhibit the production of nitric oxide in activated macrophages, a cell of the immune system.

== See also ==
- List of North American boletes
