= Pinus montana =

Pinus montana can refer to:

- Pinus montana Hoffm., a synonym of Pinus sylvestris var. sylvestris, the main variety of Scots pine
- Pinus montana Lam., a synonym of Pinus cembra L.
- Pinus montana Mill., a synonym of Pinus mugo Turra
- Pinus montana Salisb., a synonym of Pinus cembra L.
