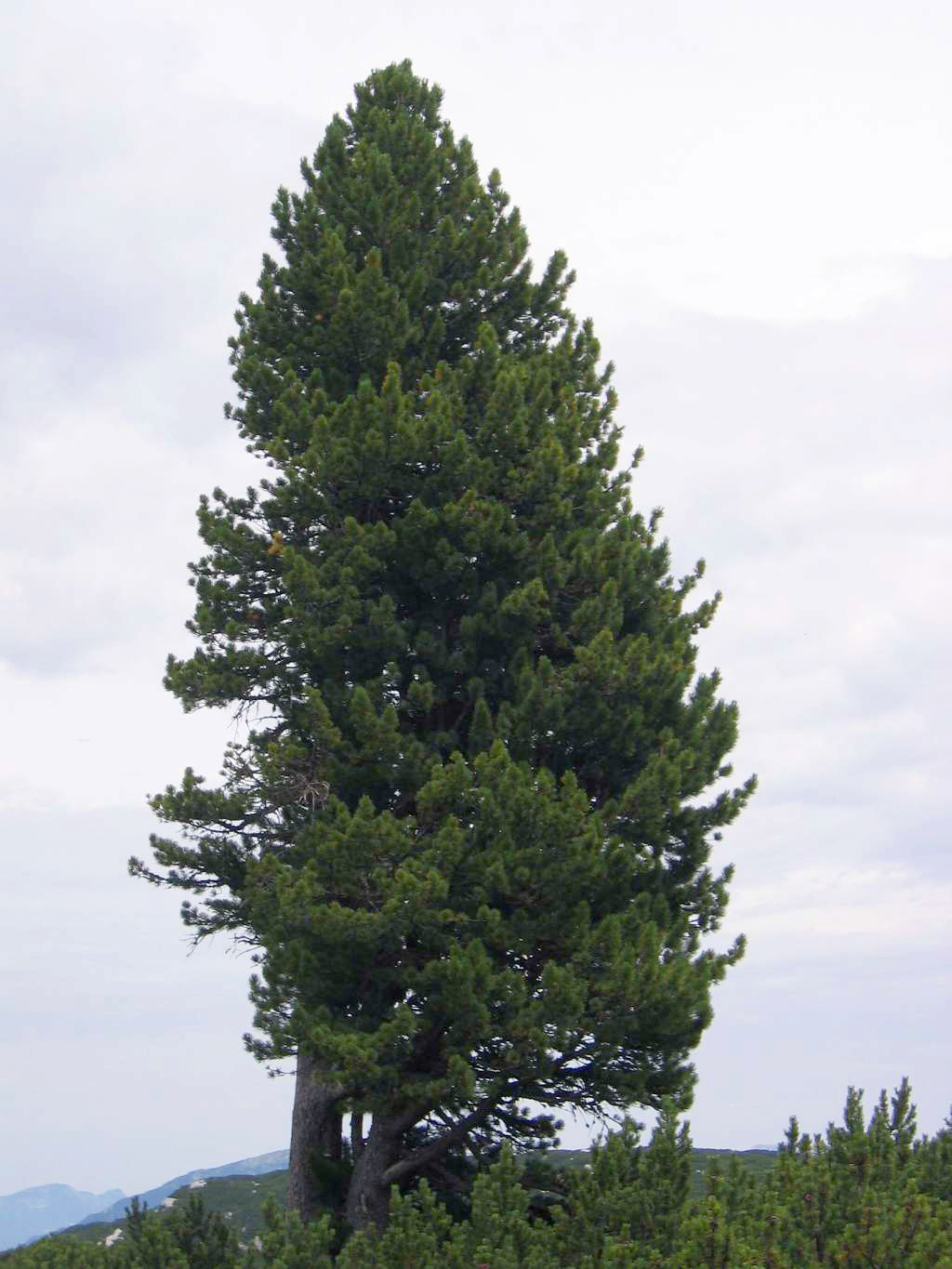
- Swiss pine growing on the Dachstein, Austria

Conservation status
- Least Concern (IUCN 3.1)

Scientific classification
- Kingdom: Plantae
- Clade: Tracheophytes
- Clade: Gymnosperms
- Division: Pinophyta
- Class: Pinopsida
- Order: Pinales
- Family: Pinaceae
- Genus: Pinus
- Subgenus: P. subg. Strobus
- Section: P. sect. Quinquefoliae
- Subsection: P. subsect. Strobus
- Species: P. cembra

Binomial name
- Pinus cembra L.
- Distribution

= Pinus cembra =

Species of plant

Pinus cembra, also known as Swiss pine, Swiss stone pine, Arolla pine, Austrian stone pine, or just stone pine, is a species of pine tree in the subgenus Strobus.

== Description ==
The Swiss pine is a member of the white pine group, Pinus subgenus Strobus, and like all members of that group, the leaves ('needles') are in fascicles (bundles) of five, with a deciduous sheath. The mature size is typically between 25 metres (82 ft) and 35 metres (115 ft) in height, and the trunk diameter can be up to 1.5 metres (4.9 ft). However, it grows very slowly and it may take 30 years for the tree to reach 1.3 metres (4.3 ft). The cones, which contain the seeds (or nuts), of the Swiss pine are 4 centimetres (1.6 in) to 8 centimetres (3.1 in) long. Cones take 2 years (24 months) to mature. The 8 millimetres (0.31 in) to 12 millimetres (0.47 in) long seeds have only a vestigial wing and are dispersed by spotted nutcrackers. The species is long-lasting and can reach an age between 500 and 1000 years.

In its natural environment, this tree usually reaches reproductive maturity at the age of 50 years (even 80 years, if the conditions are more extreme).

The very similar Siberian pine (Pinus sibirica) is treated as a variety or subspecies of Swiss pine by some botanists. The Siberian pine differs in having slightly larger cones, being more massive (taller, wider trunk), having a faster growth rate and needles with three resin canals instead of two as in the Swiss pine.

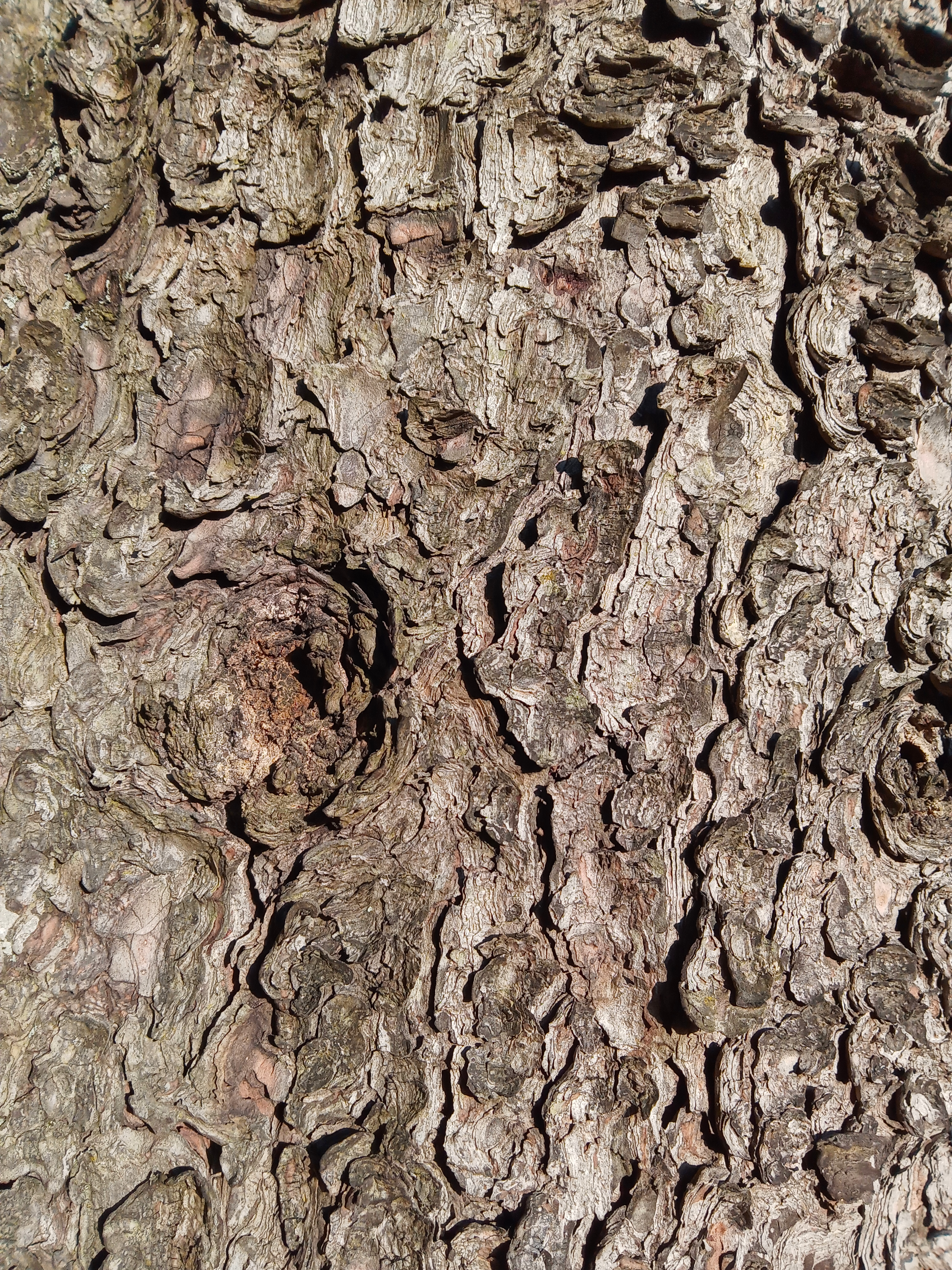
Bark of middle-aged Pinus cembra

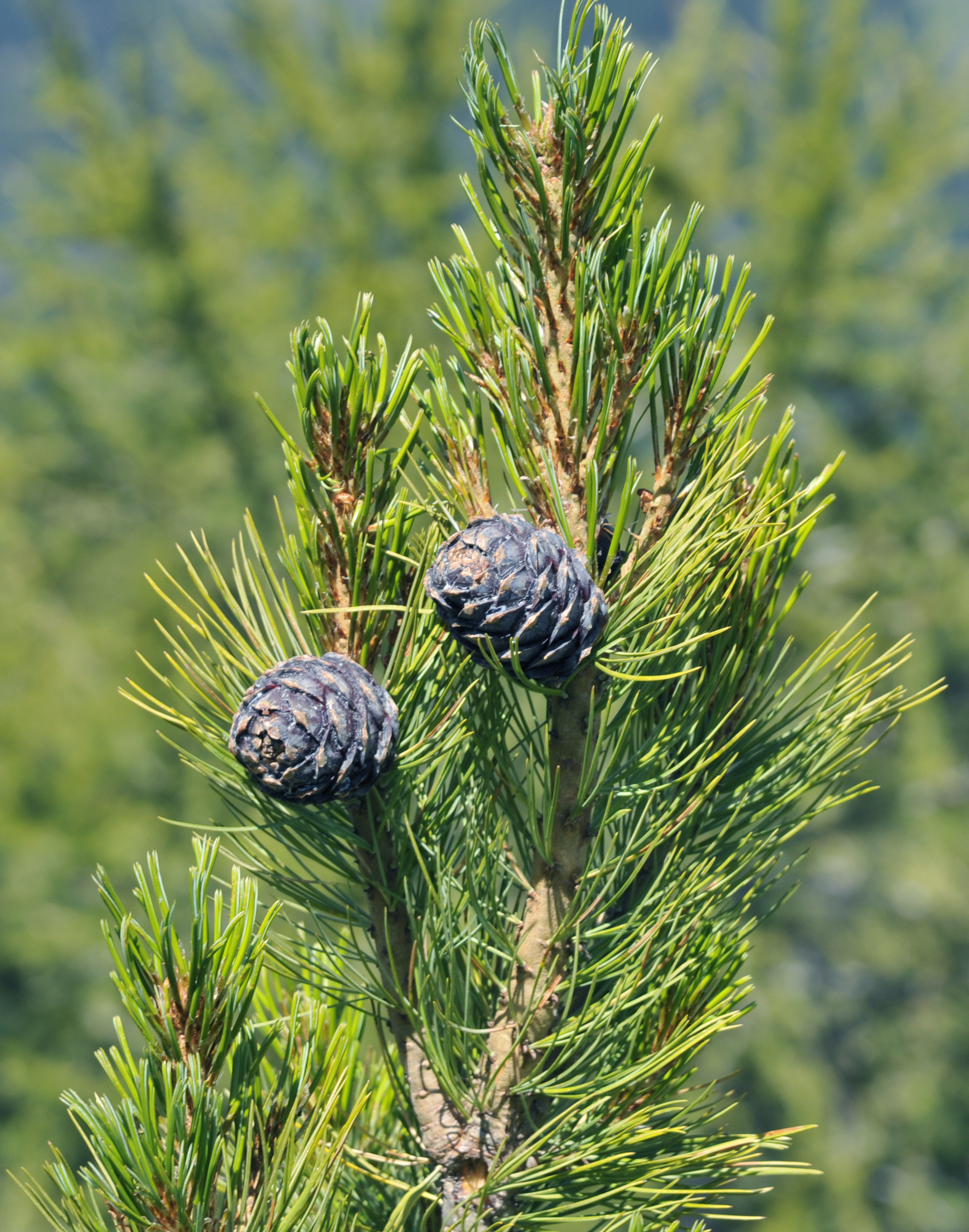
Cones of Pinus cembra

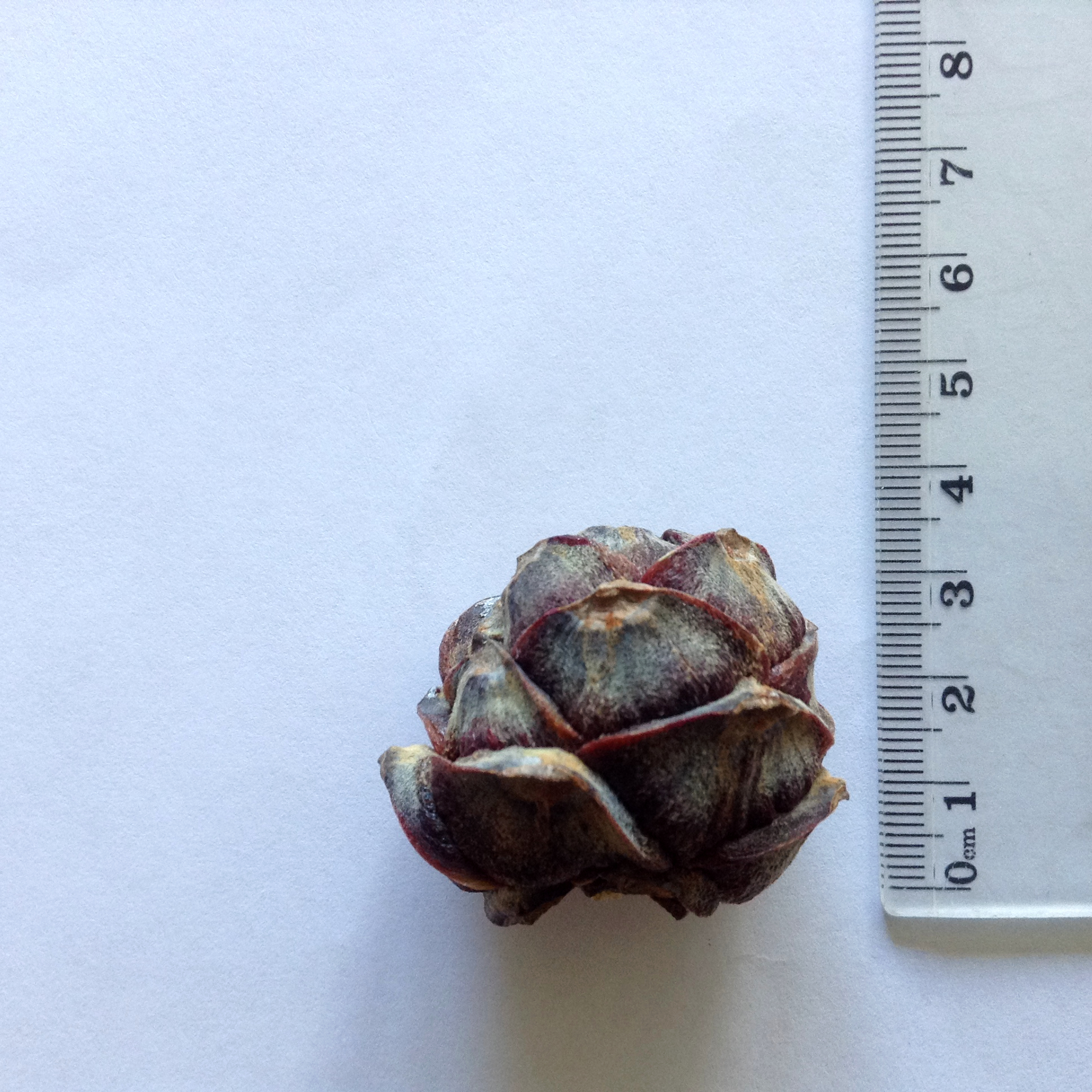
Close-up of an immature cone from a cultivated Pinus cembra

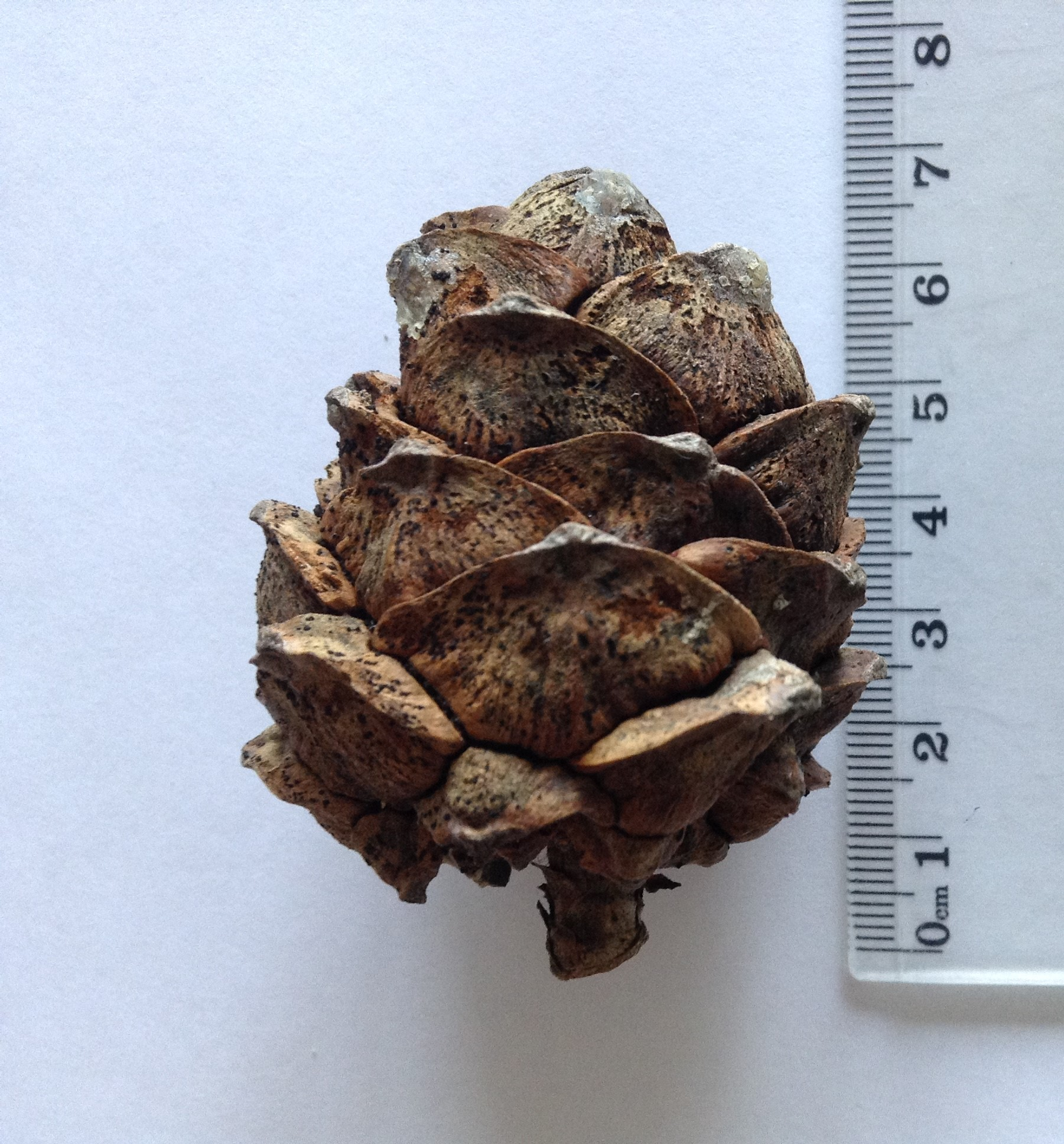
Close-up of a mature cone from a cultivated Pinus cembra

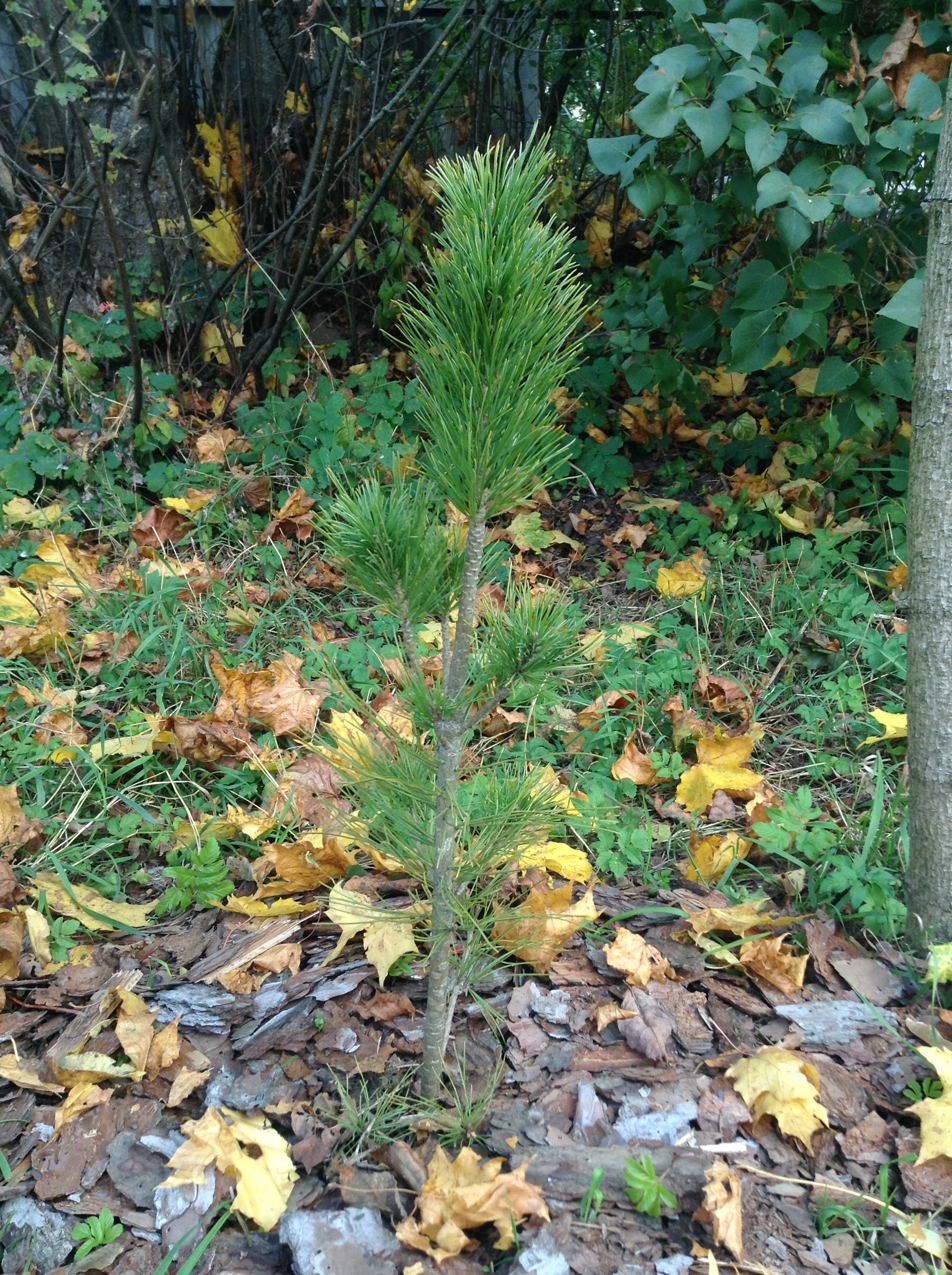
5-year-old Pinus cembra seedling planted for pine nut production, Baldone, Latvia

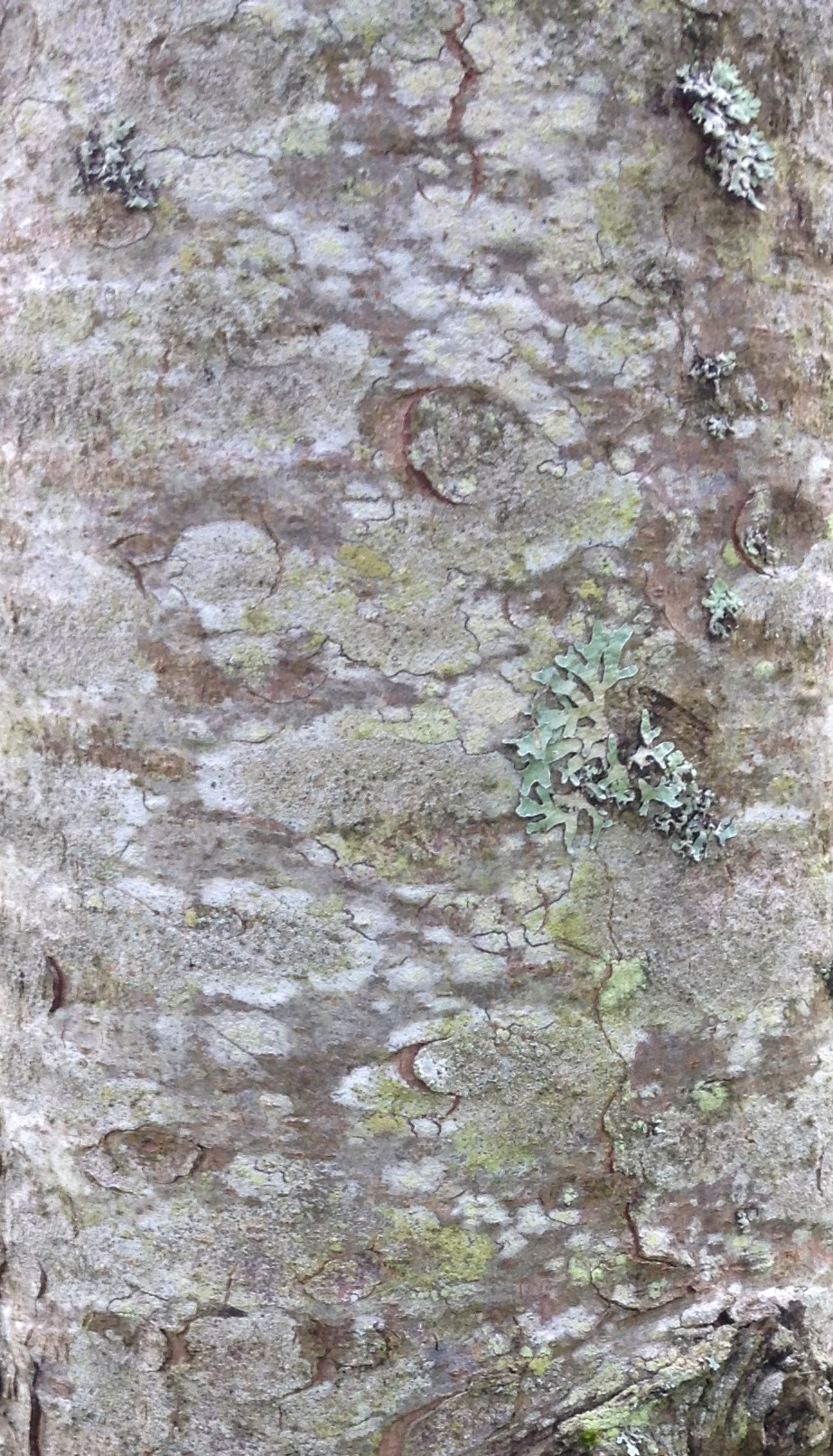
Bark of a young Pinus cembra, National Botanic Garden of Latvia

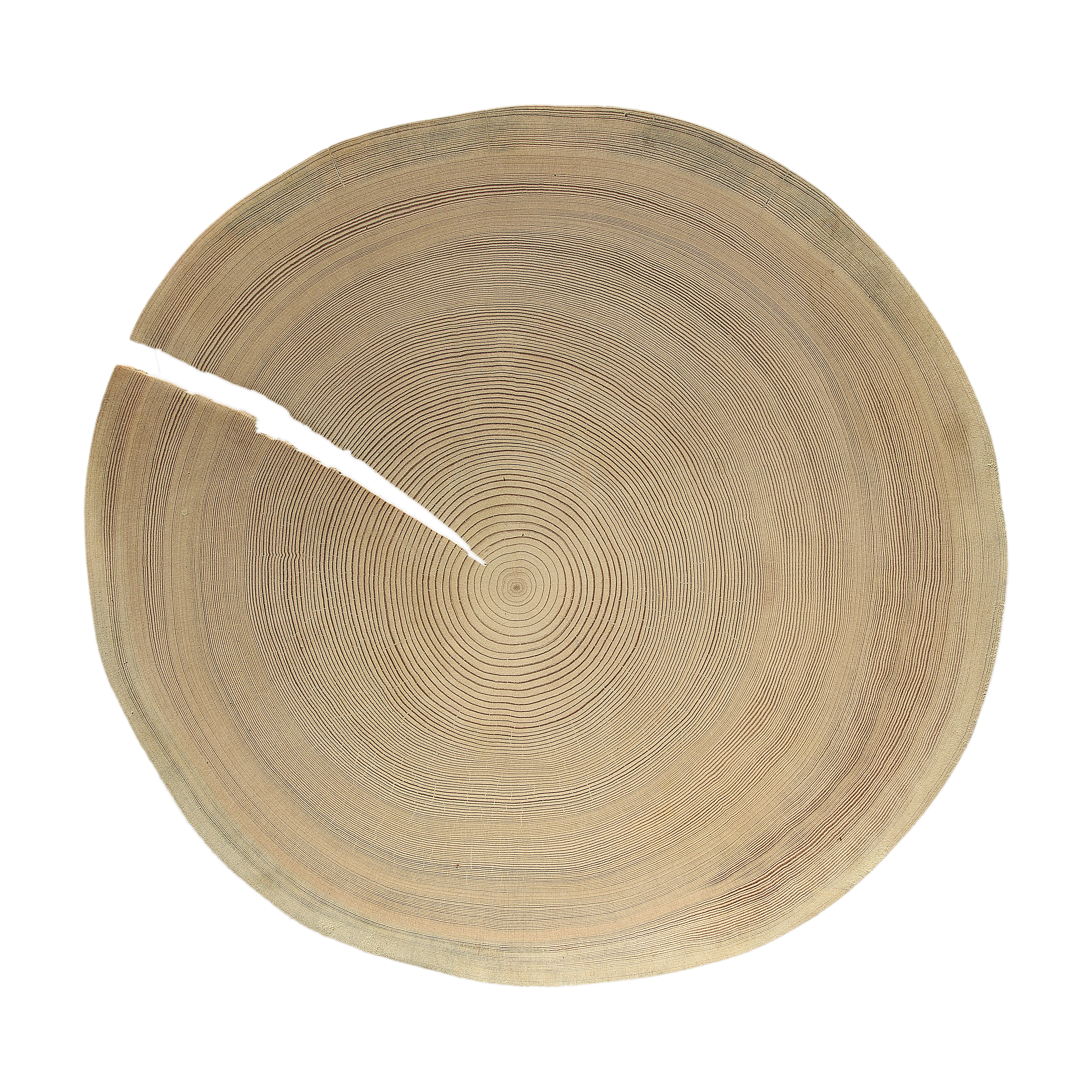
Cross-section of Pinus cembra - 181 years - MHNT

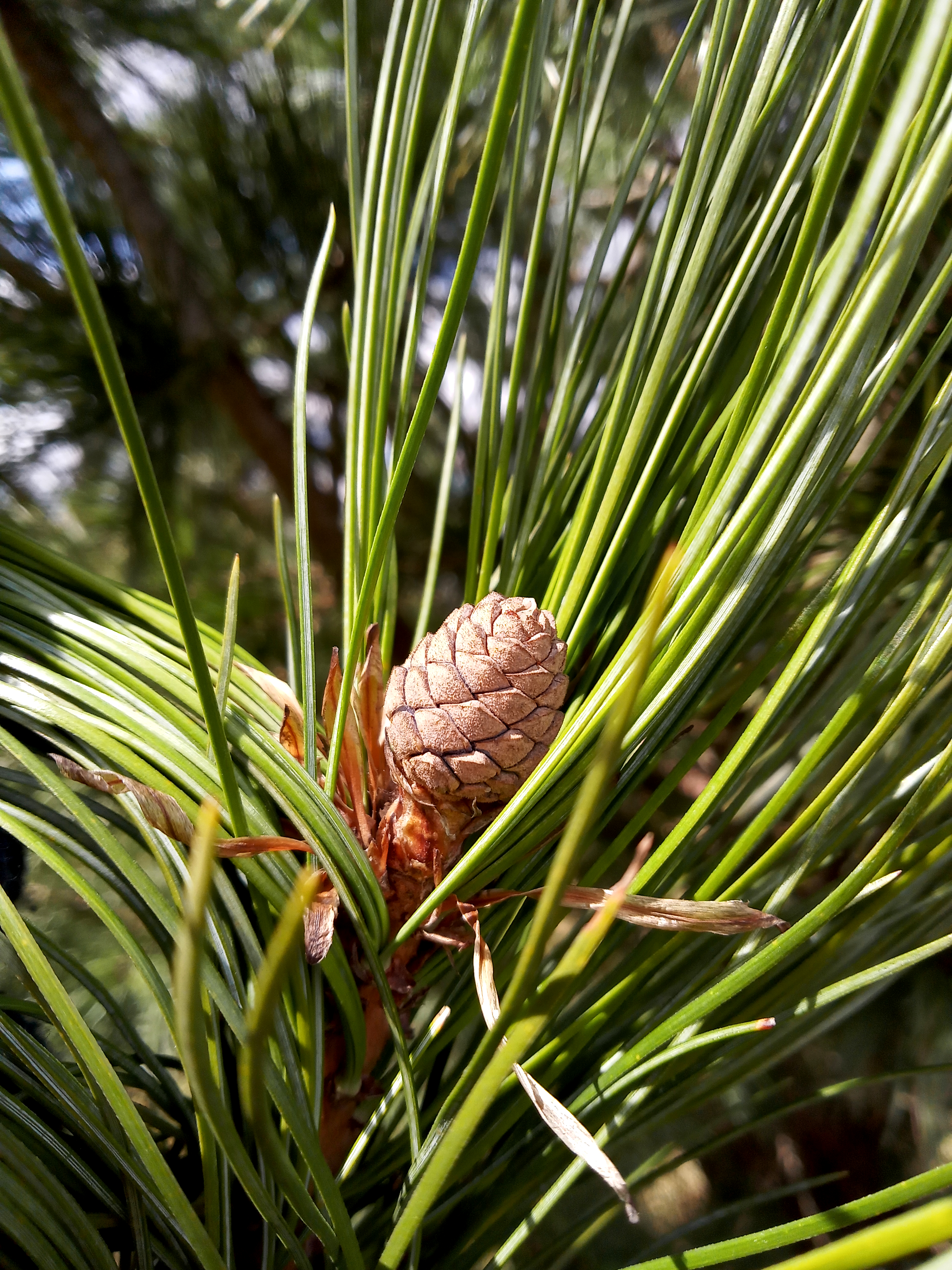
Pinus cembra 'Columnaris' (cultivar) one year-old cone and foliage

== Distribution and habitat ==
The Swiss pine grows in the Alps and Carpathian Mountains of central Europe, in Poland (Tatra Mountains), Switzerland, France, Italy, Austria, Germany, Slovenia, Slovakia (Tatra Mountains), Ukraine and Romania. It typically grows at 1,200 metres (3,900 ft) to 2,300 metres (7,500 ft) altitude. It often reaches the alpine tree line in this area.

Pinus cembra with Rhododendron ferrugineum on the trail to the Furcela Piza with the Odles Group and the Mastlé Mountain, Puez-Geisler Nature Park, Dolomites

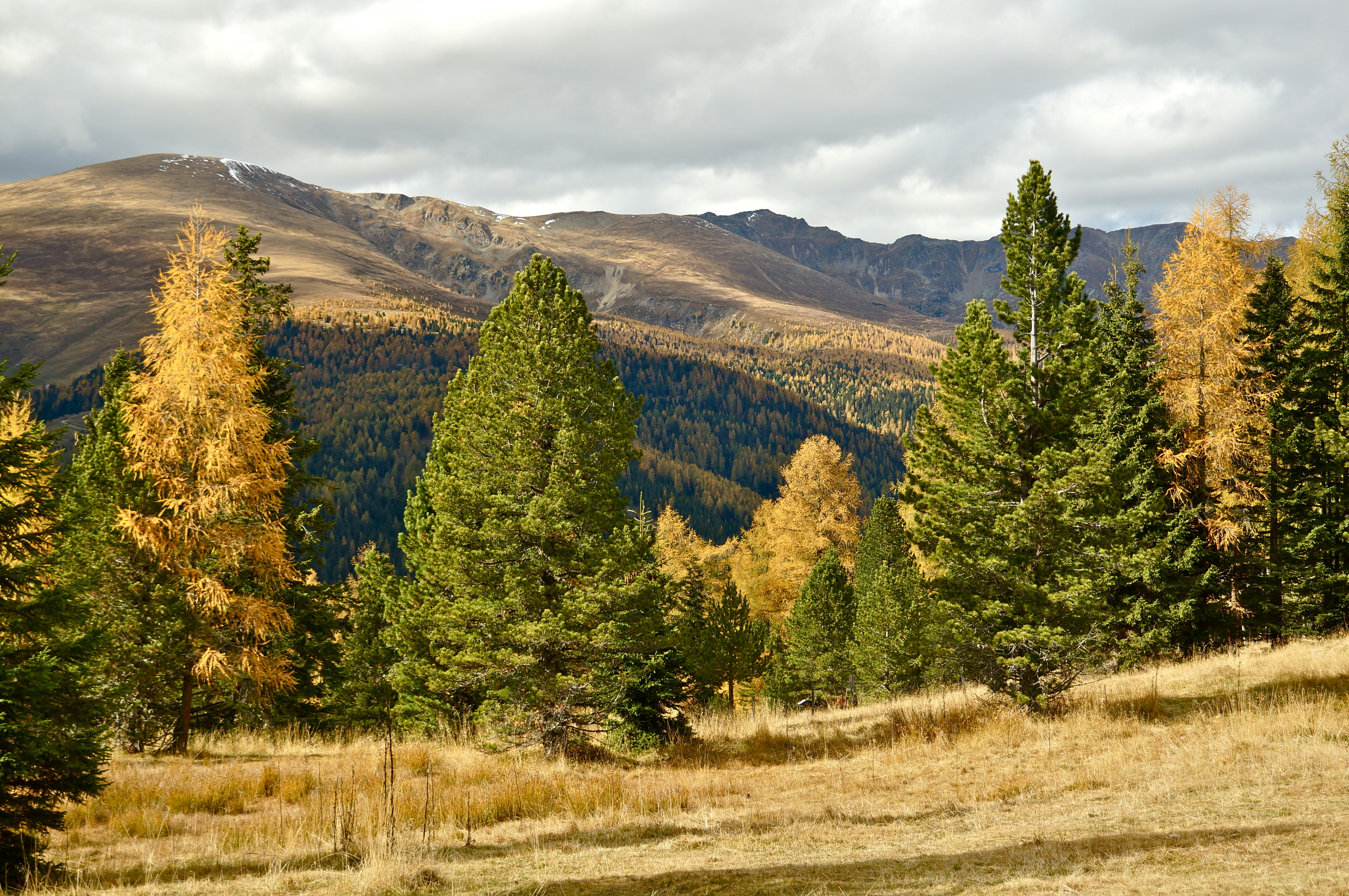
Autumnal Larix decidua (yellow), Pinus cembra (dark green, wide), and Picea abies (dark green, slender) landscape. Carinthia, Austria

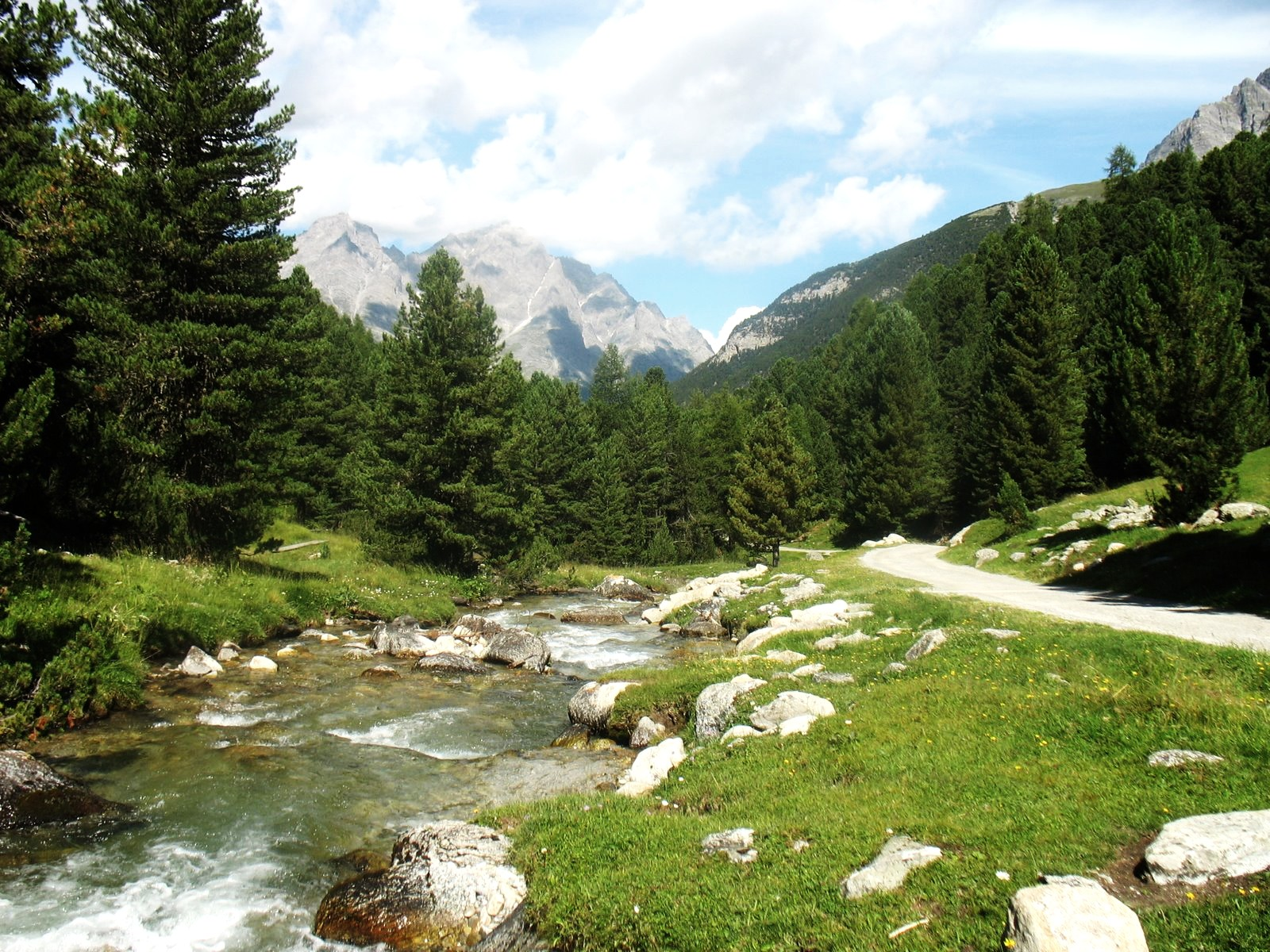
In Tamangur forest. Scuol, Switzerland

== Ecology ==
Swiss pine associates with numerous species of mycorrhizal fungi from a young age, usually from the genus Suillus. This symbiosis improves the tree's growth and survival rate.

== Uses ==
Swiss pine is a popular ornamental tree in parks and large gardens, giving steady though not fast growth on a wide range of sites where the climate is cold. It is very tolerant of severe winter cold, hardy down to at least −50 °C (−58 °F), and also of wind exposure. The seeds are also harvested and sold as pine nuts. When cultivated, it will likely start producing cones after the age of 12 years, much faster than in the wild. This depends on the climate, soil type, mycorrhizal fungi etc. To make the tree bear cones faster, the tree can be inoculated with ectomycorrhizal fungi, such as Suillus luteus, Suillus americanus, Suillus placidus etc. These are the most effective.

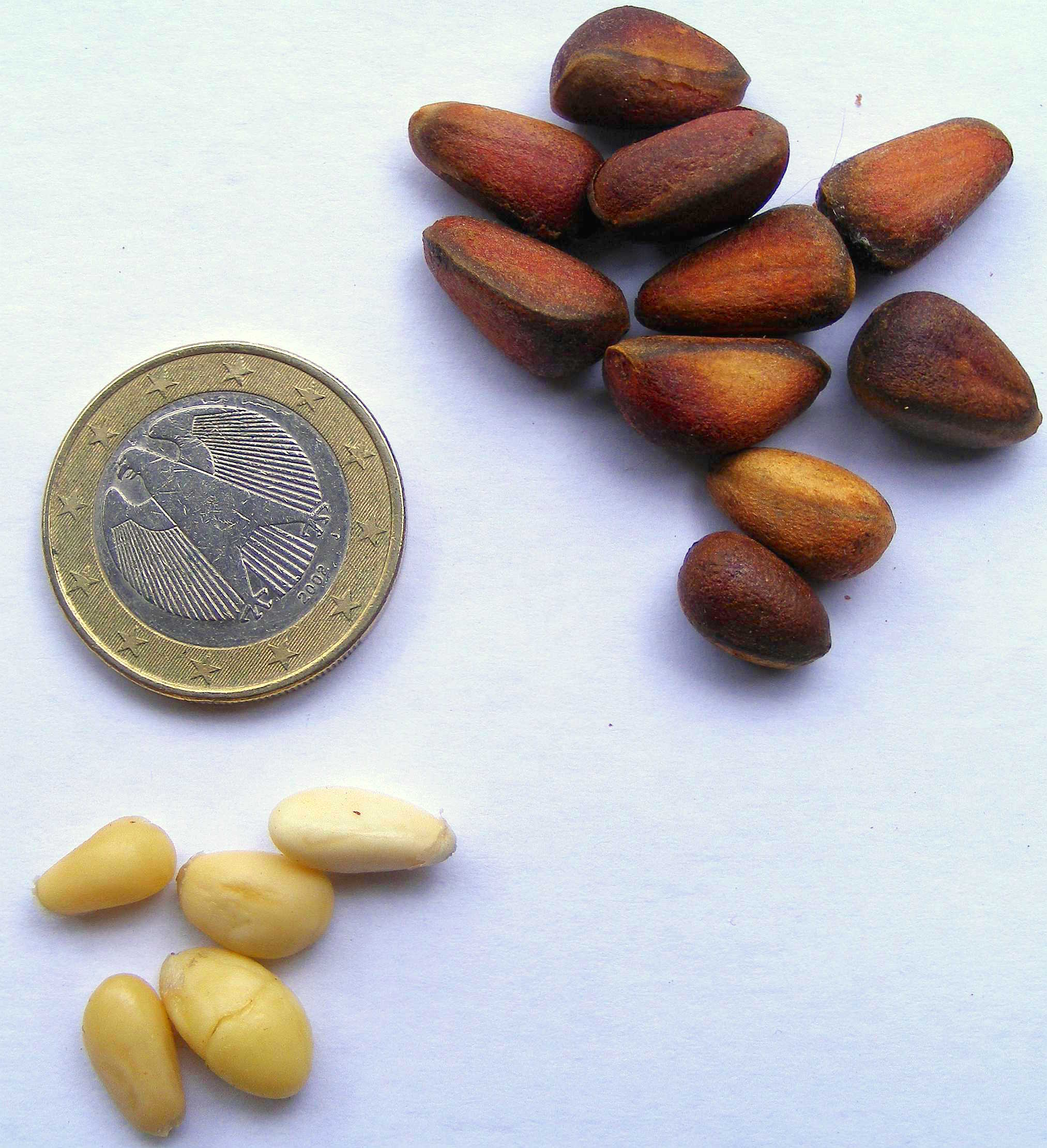
Seeds with and without their shell, with a one-euro coin for scale (23.25mm diameter)

Pine cones cut into slices are used to flavor schnapps, which is then sold as "Zirbenschnaps" or "Zirbeler" schnapps.

The wood is the most used for carvings in Val Gardena since the 17th century.

The cone of the Swiss pine was the field sign of the Roman legion stationed in Rhaetia in 15 BC, and hence it is used as the heraldic charge (known as Zirbelnuss in German) in the coat of arms of the city of Augsburg, the site of the Roman fort Augusta Vindelicorum.

It is also a species that is often used in bonsai.

Pinus cembra can be found in the uppermost forest belt where it helps to minimize the risk of avalanches and soil erosion. Due to this ability, the tree is valued as a stabilizing factor for afforestation projects at high elevations.

Like other European and Asian white pines, Swiss pine is very resistant to white pine blister rust (Cronartium ribicola). This fungal disease was accidentally introduced from Europe into North America, where it has caused severe mortality in the American native white pines in many areas, notably, Western white pine and the closely related whitebark pine. Swiss pine is of great value for research into hybridization to develop rust resistance in these species.
