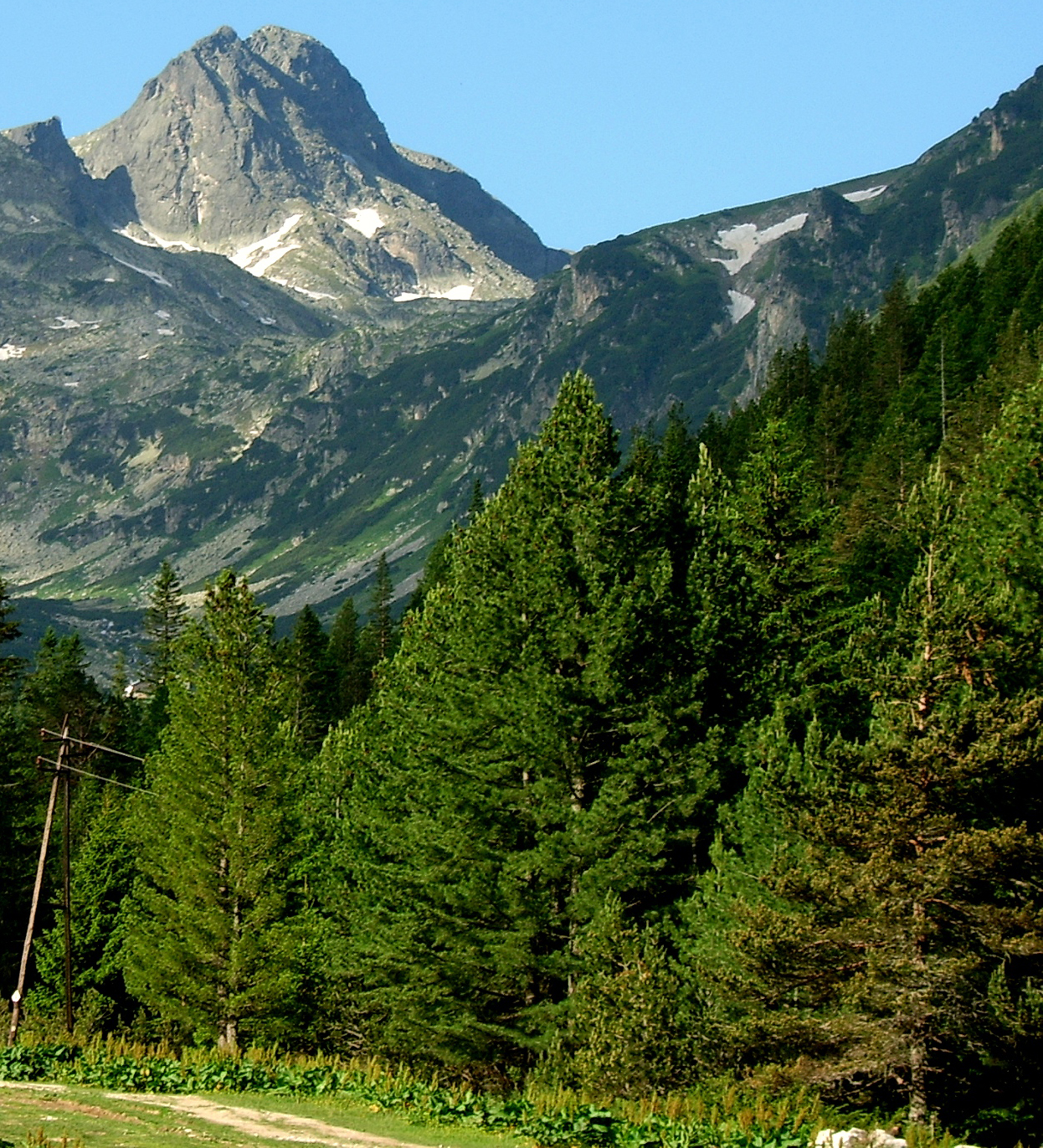
- Trees in native environment, Malyovitsa, Rila Mountains, Bulgaria.

Conservation status
- Near Threatened (IUCN 3.1)

Scientific classification
- Kingdom: Plantae
- Clade: Tracheophytes
- Clade: Gymnosperms
- Division: Pinophyta
- Class: Pinopsida
- Order: Pinales
- Family: Pinaceae
- Genus: Pinus
- Subgenus: P. subg. Strobus
- Section: P. sect. Quinquefoliae
- Subsection: P. subsect. Strobus
- Species: P. peuce

Binomial name
- Pinus peuce Griseb.
- Distribution range of Pinus peuce

= Pinus peuce =

Species of plant

Pinus peuce (Macedonian pine or Balkan pine) (Serbo-Croatian and Macedonian: молика, molika; Bulgarian: бяла мура, byala mura) is a species of pine native to the mountains of North Macedonia, Bulgaria, Albania, Montenegro, Kosovo, the extreme southwest of Serbia, and the extreme northwest of Greece, growing typically at (600-) 1,000-2,200 (-2,300) m altitude. It often reaches the alpine tree line in this area. The species was first described in scientific literature by August Grisebach in 1844, based on field observations of montane pines on Baba Mountain, above Bitola.

== Description ==
It is a member of the white pine group, Pinus subgenus Strobus, Mature trees reach a height of 35–40 m (115–131 ft) and a trunk diameter of 1.5 m (5 ft). However, the height of the tree diminishes strongly near the upper tree line and may even obtain shrub sizes.

Like all members of that group, the leaves ('needles') are in fascicles (bundles) of five, with a deciduous sheath. They are 6–11 cm (2.4–4.3 in) long. Its pine cones are mostly 8–16 cm (3–6 in) long, occasionally up to 20 cm (8 in) long, green at first, becoming yellow-brown when mature, with broad, flat to downcurved scales. 6–7 mm (0.24–0.28 in) long seeds have a 2 cm (0.79 in) wing and can be wind-dispersed, but are also very often dispersed by spotted nutcrackers.

== Cultivation and uses ==
Macedonian pine is one of the most valuable conifer species in the Balkan Peninsula. Its durable wood is highly valued in construction, furniture production, wood-carving and cooperage. The tree is also exceptionally good at adapting to severe mountain climate conditions, which makes it a valuable species for afforestation on high terrain for protection against erosion. The local population use P. peuce resin to cure wounds, pectoral, skin and stomach diseases, varicose veins and other illnesses.

Macedonian pine is also a popular ornamental tree in parks and large gardens, giving reliable steady though not fast growth on a wide range of sites. It is very tolerant of severe winter cold, hardy down to at least −45 °C (−49 °F), and also of wind exposure. It is locally naturalised in Punkaharju in eastern Finland.

Like other European and Asian white pines, Macedonian pine is very resistant to white pine blister rust (Cronartium ribicola). This fungal disease was accidentally introduced from Europe into North America, where it has caused severe mortality in the American native white pines (e.g. western white pine, sugar pine, whitebark pine) in many areas. Macedonian pine is of great value for research into hybridisation and genetic modification to develop rust resistance in these species; hybrids with eastern white pine inherit some resistance.

== Other ==
Synonyms include Pinus cembra var. fruticosa Griseb., Pinus excelsa var. peuce (Griseb.) Beissn., Pinus peuce var. vermiculata Christ, and Balkan pine.

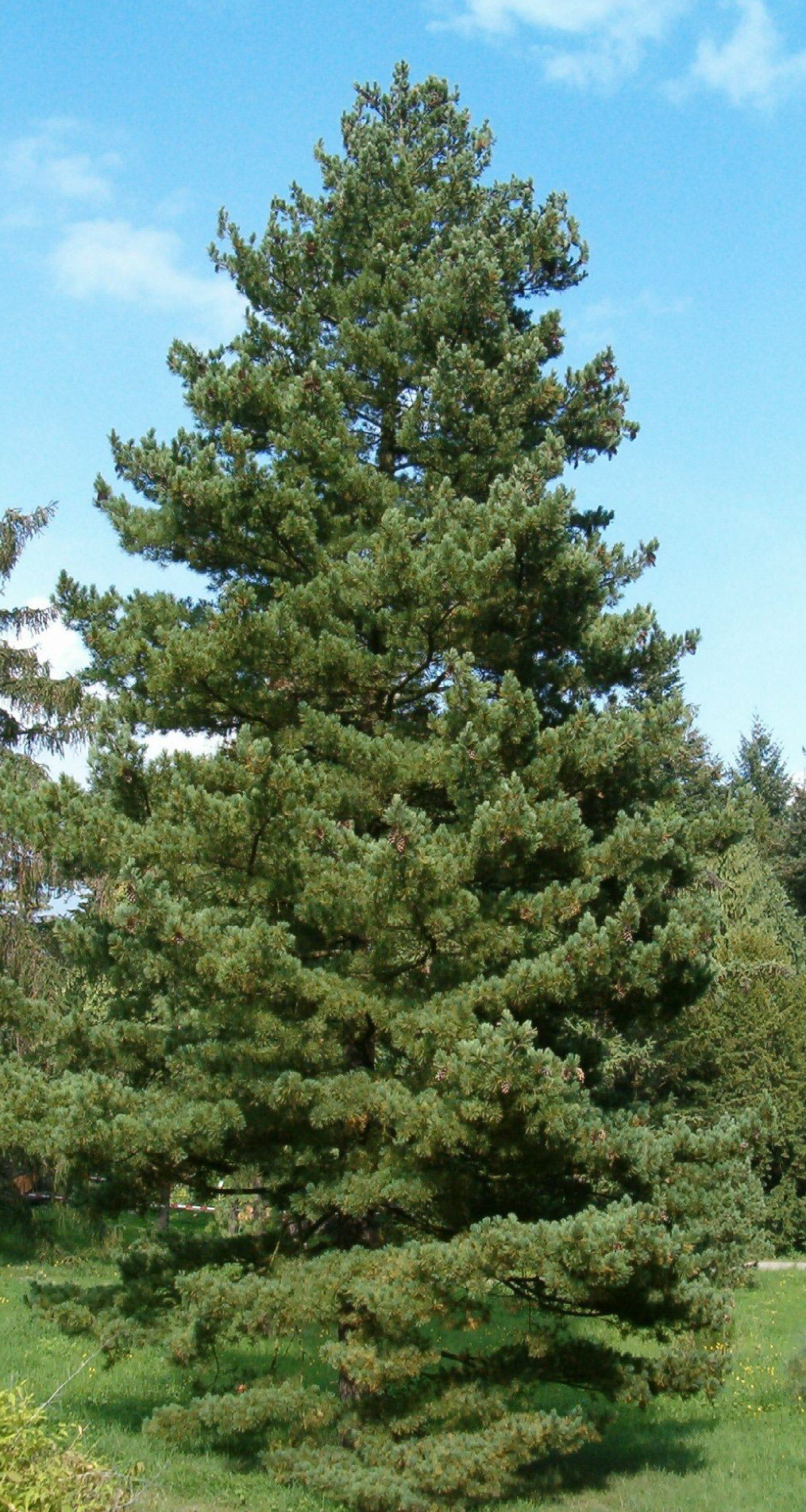
Cultivated specimen, Berlin Botanical Gardens

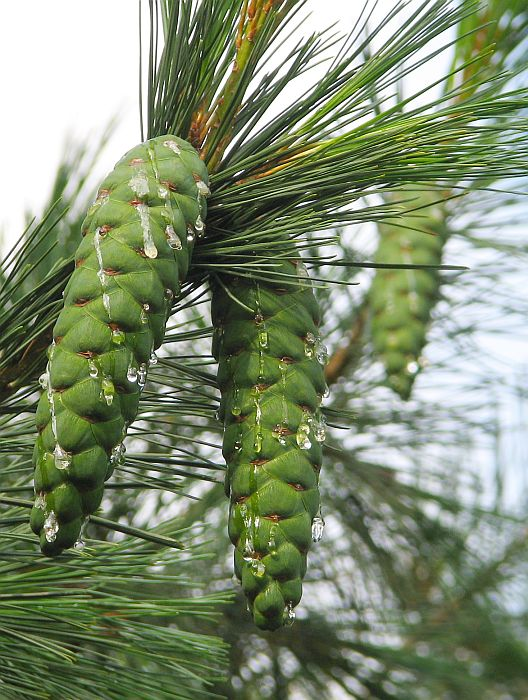
Foliage and cones

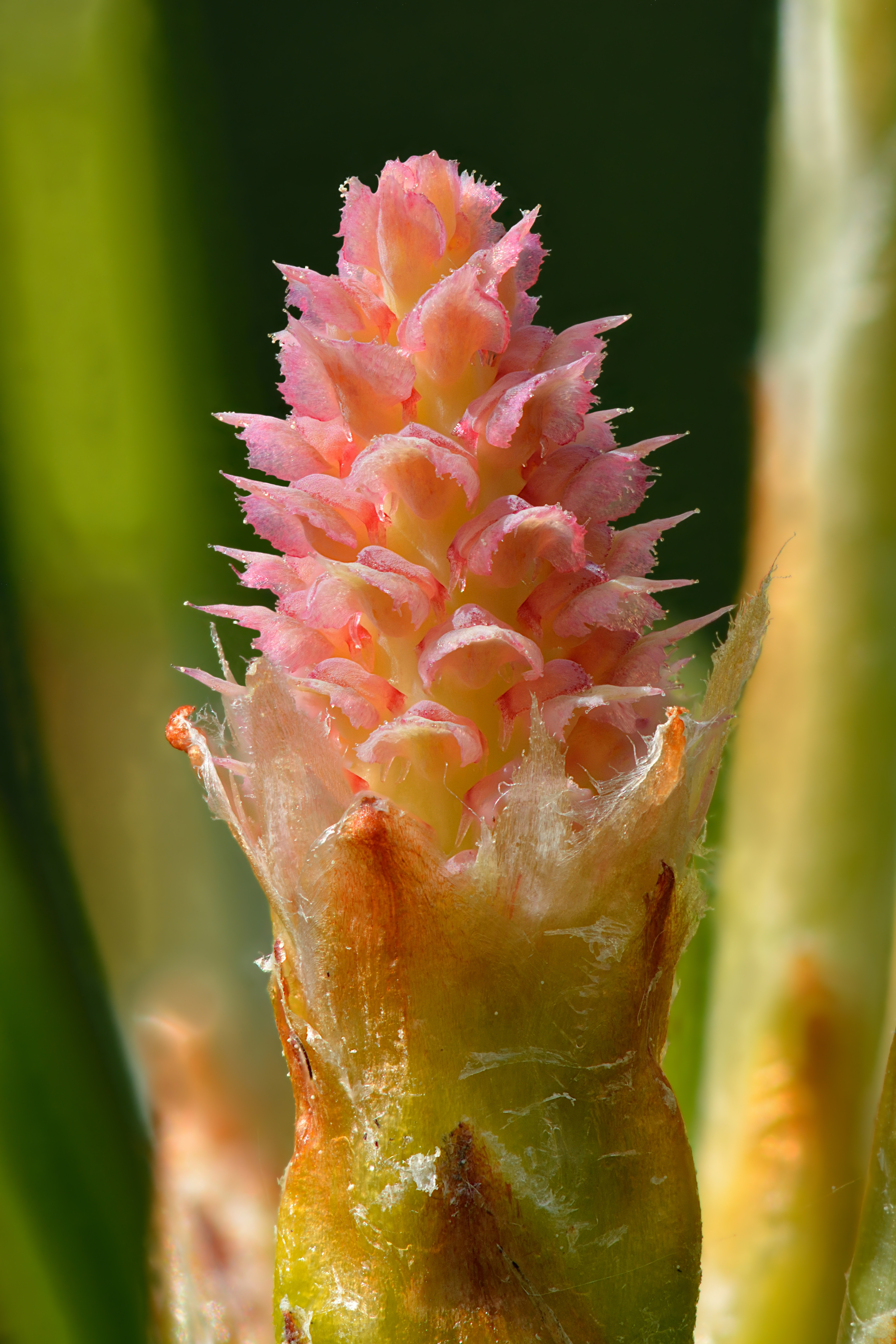
Young female cone
