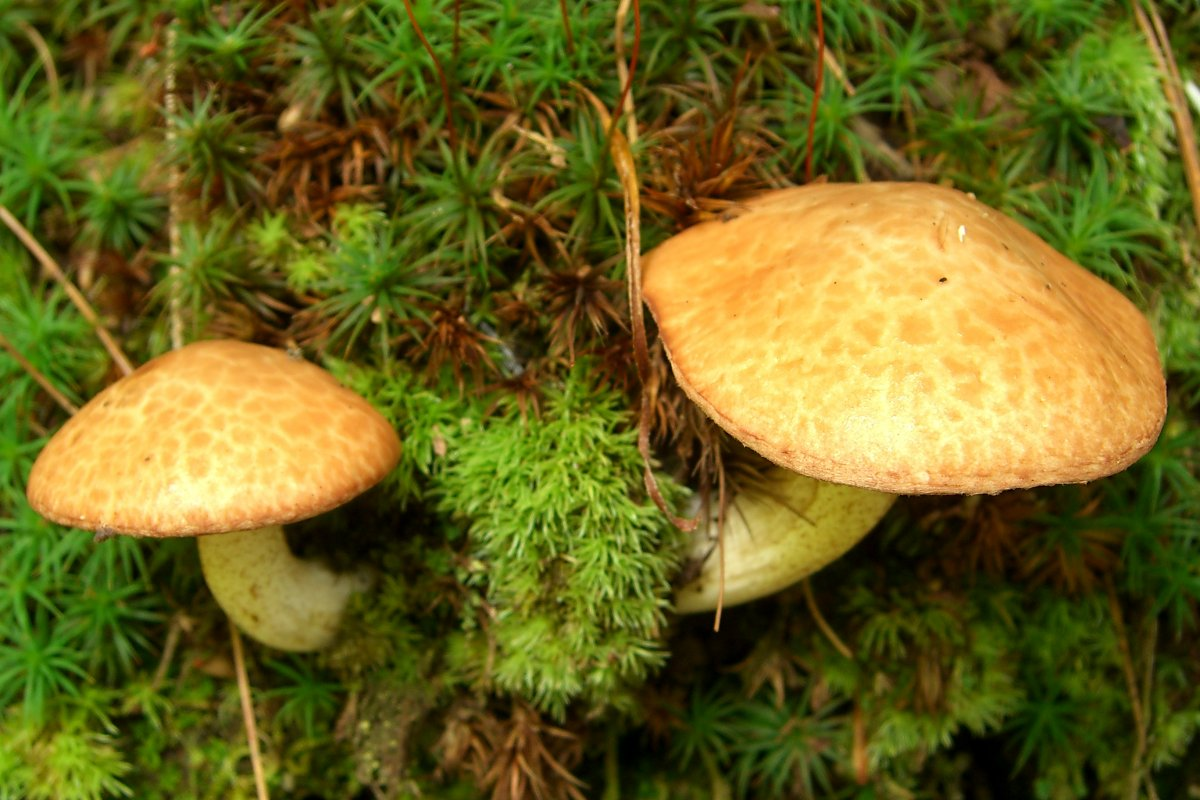

Scientific classification
- Domain: Eukaryota
- Kingdom: Fungi
- Division: Basidiomycota
- Class: Agaricomycetes
- Order: Boletales
- Family: Suillaceae
- Genus: Suillus
- Species: S. subaureus

Binomial name
- Suillus subaureus (Peck) Snell (1944)

Synonyms
- Boletus subaureus Peck (1887); Rostkovites subaureus (Peck) Murrill (1909); Boletus subaureus var. rubroscriptus Peck (1913); Ixocomus subaureus (Peck) Singer (1938); Boletus subaureus var. siccipes Coker & Beers (1943)

= Suillus subaureus =

Species of fungus

Suillus subaureus is a rare species of bolete fungus in the family Suillaceae. It is found in North America, where it associates with deciduous trees. Originally described in 1887 by Charles Horton Peck, it was transferred to genus Suillus by Wally Snell in 1944. Fruitbodies are pale yellow—reflecting its specific epithet subaureus, which means "somewhat golden yellow". The spore print is olive brown. Spores are smooth and inamyloid, and measure 7–10 by 2.7–3.5 μm. It has also been recorded in Taiwan.

A recent study of this species indicates that S. subaureus associates with both deciduous and conifer trees in eastern North American forests. The spores of S. subaureus will not germinate in the presence of only deciduous tree roots. Instead, they require the presence of a conifer host tree (preferably Pinus) to germinate, but will then colonize and persist on deciduous hosts via mycelial extension.

The species is edible.

== See also ==
- List of North American boletes
