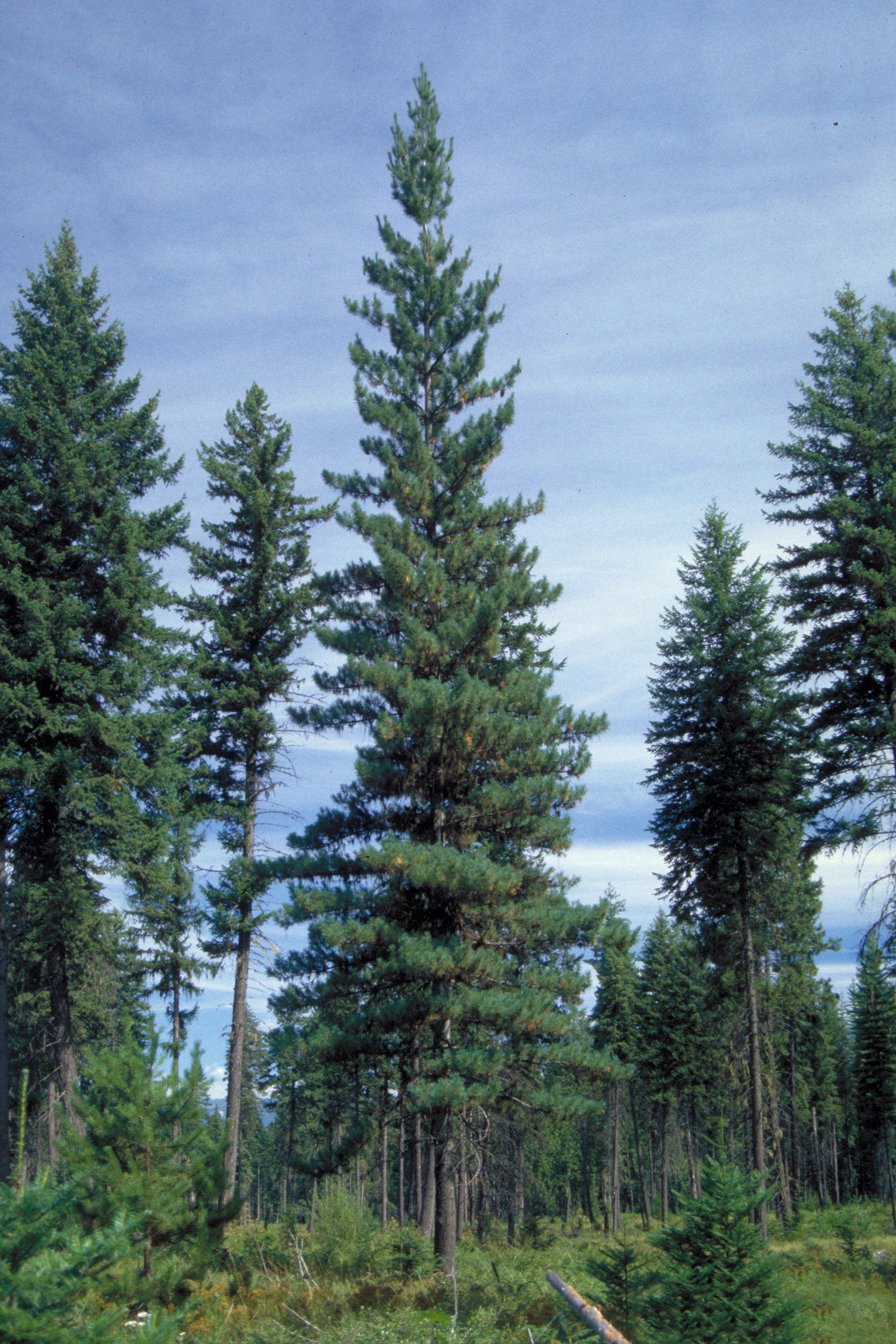
- Western white pine (center)

Conservation status
- Near Threatened (IUCN 3.1)

- Apparently Secure (NatureServe)

Scientific classification
- Kingdom: Plantae
- Clade: Tracheophytes
- Clade: Gymnospermae
- Division: Pinophyta
- Class: Pinopsida
- Order: Pinales
- Family: Pinaceae
- Genus: Pinus
- Subgenus: P. subg. Strobus
- Section: P. sect. Quinquefoliae
- Subsection: P. subsect. Strobus
- Species: P. monticola

Binomial name
- Pinus monticola Douglas ex D. Don
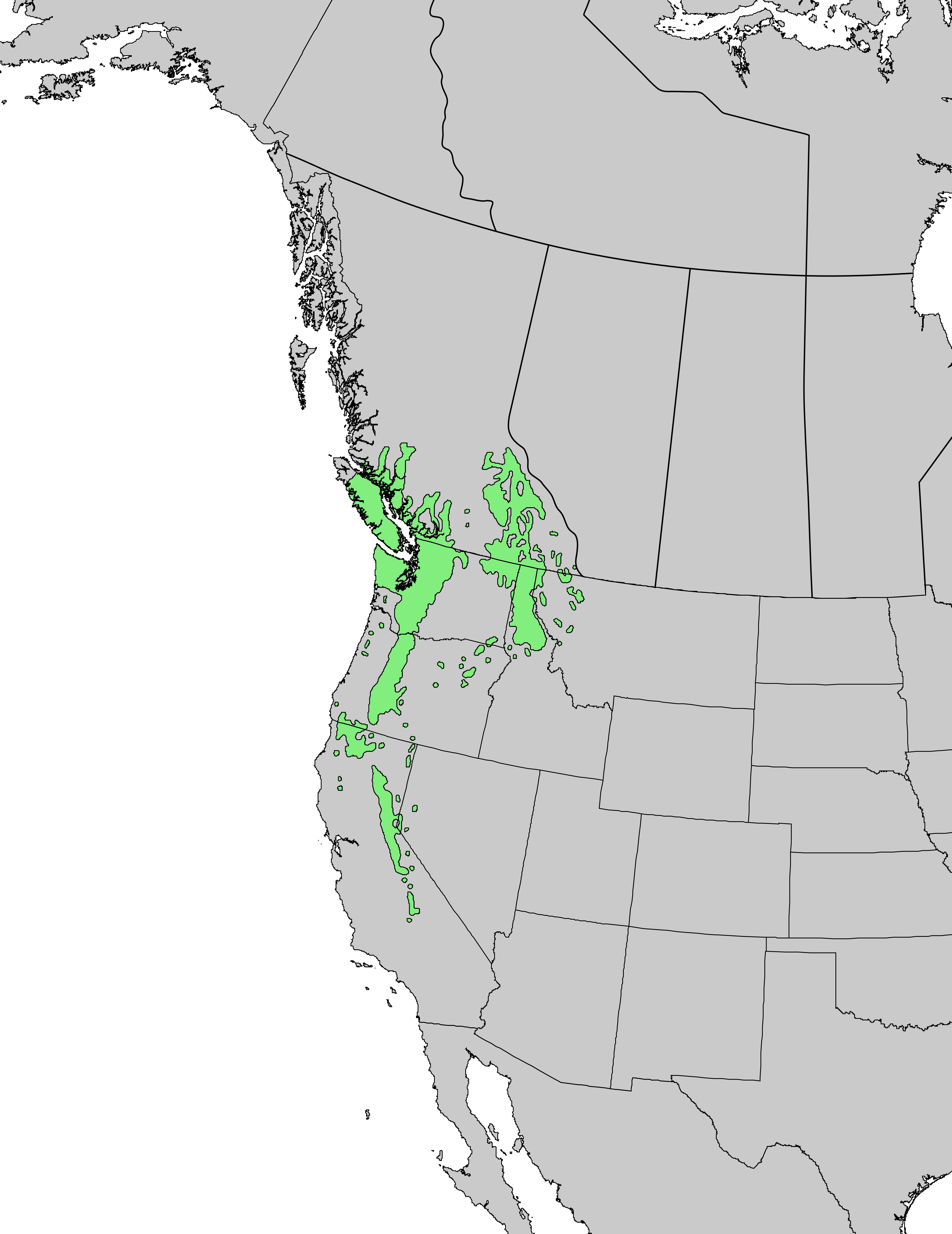

Synonyms
- List: Pinus grozelieri Carrière (1869); Pinus monticola var. digitata Lemmon (1895); Pinus monticola var. minima Lemmon (1888); Pinus monticola f. porphyrocarpa (A.Murray bis) P.Landry (1976); Pinus monticola var. porphyrocarpa (A.Murray bis) Mast. (1892); Pinus porphyrocarpa A.Murray (1866); Pinus strobus var. monticola (Douglas ex D.Don) Nutt. (1849); Pinus strobus subsp. monticola (Douglas ex D.Don) A.E.Murray (1982); Strobus monticola (Douglas ex D.Don) Rydb. (1917)

= Western white pine =

Western white pine Pinus monticola

Pine tree found in North America

Western white pine (Pinus monticola), also called silver pine and California mountain pine, is a species of pine in the family Pinaceae. It occurs in mountain ranges of northwestern North America and is the state tree of Idaho.

== Description ==
Western white pine is a large tree, regularly growing to 30–50 metres (98–164 ft) tall. It is a member of the white pine group, Pinus subgenus Strobus, and like all members of that group, the leaves ('needles') are in fascicles (bundles) of five, with a deciduous sheath. The needles are finely serrated, and 5–13 cm (2–5 in) long. The cones, appearing even on young trees, are long and slender, 12–32 cm (4 3/4–12 1/2 in) long and 3–4 cm (1 1/4–1 1/2 in) broad (closed), opening to 5–8 cm (2–3 1/4 in) broad; the scales are thin and flexible. The seeds are small, 4–7 mm (3/16–1/4 in) long, and have a long slender wing 15–22 mm (9/16–7/8 in) long.

The branches are borne in regular whorls, produced at the rate of one a year; this is pronounced in narrow, stand-grown trees, while open specimens may have a more rounded form with wide-reaching limbs. When mature, the tree has bark that appears to be cut into small, checkered units.

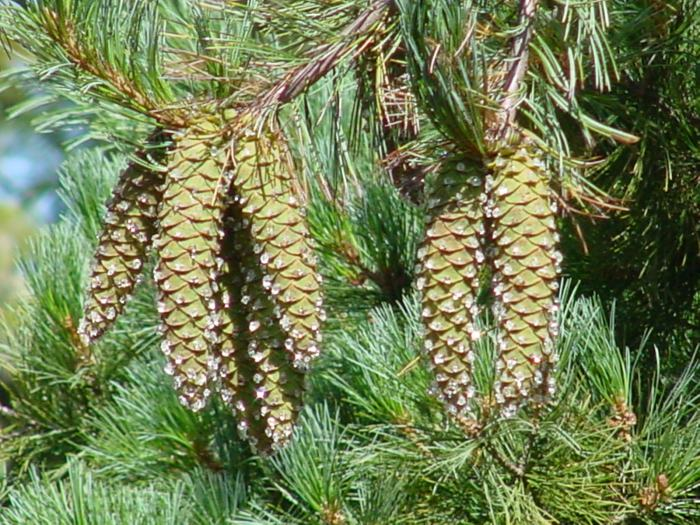
Foliage and cones

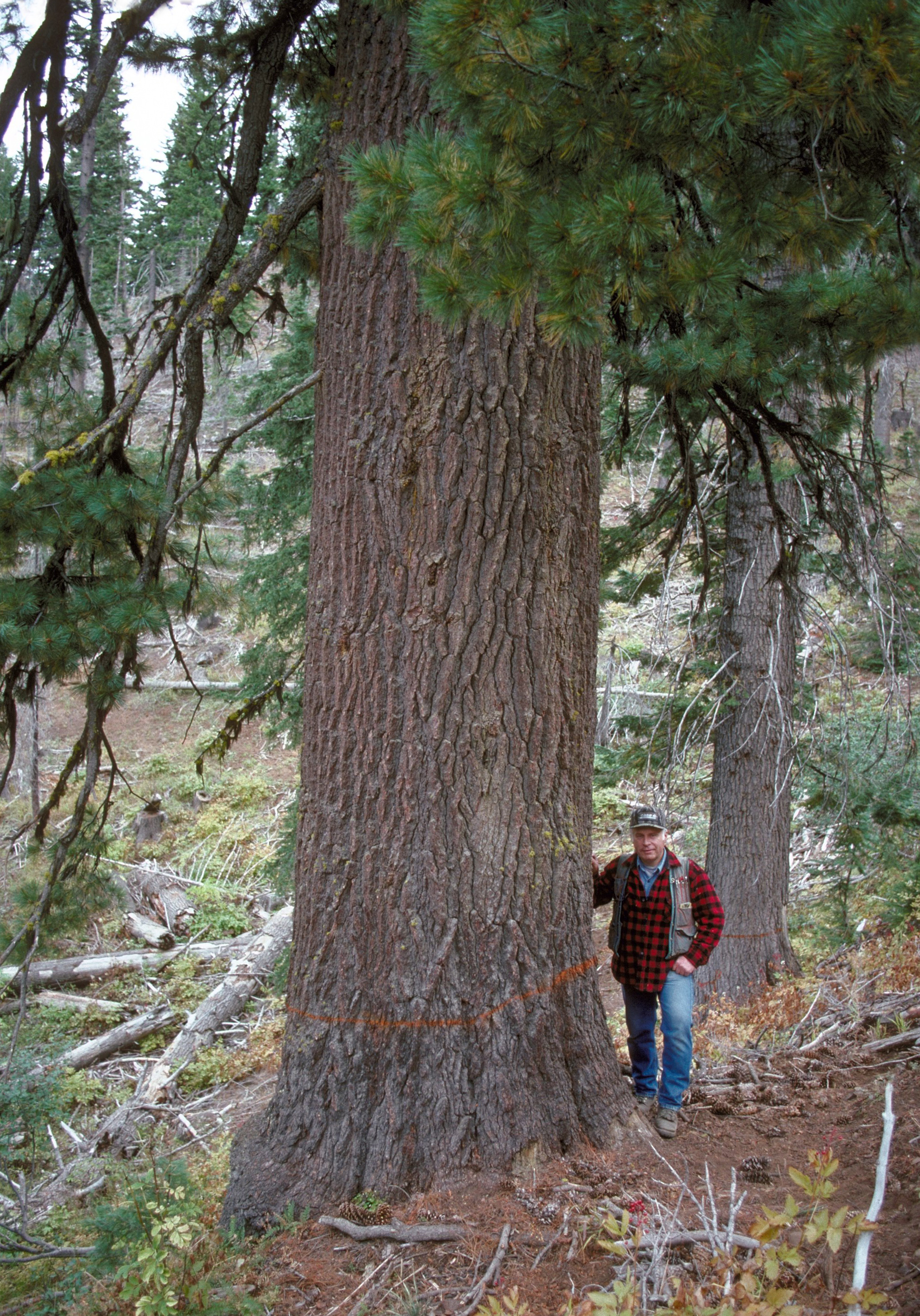
Large P. monticola

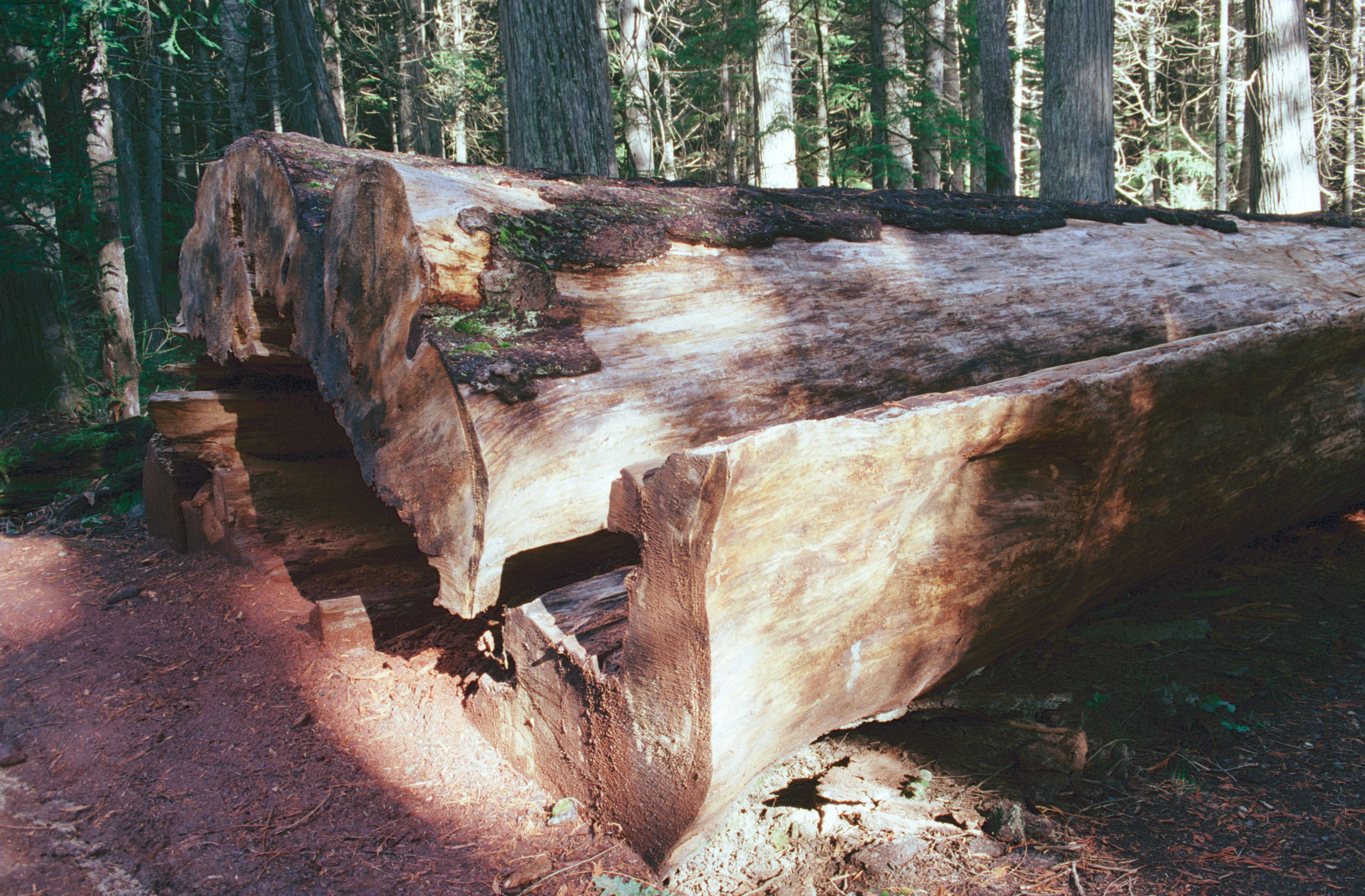
A Western white pine in St. Joe National Forest (died in 1998 and cut down in 1999)

=== Similar species ===
It is related to the eastern white pine (Pinus strobus), differing from it in having larger cones, slightly longer-lasting leaves (2–3 years, rather than 1.5–2 years) with more prominent stomatal bands, and a somewhat denser and narrower habit.

== Distribution ==
The species occurs in humid areas of the mountains of the Western United States and Western Canada such as the Sierra Nevada, the Cascade Range, the Coast Range, and the northern Rocky Mountains. It can be found in elevations of 600 to 1,800 meters (2,000 to 5,900 ft) above sea level in eastern Washington and Oregon's Blue Mountains and 1,800 to 3,100 metres (5,900 to 10,200 ft) on the western face of the Sierra Nevada as far south as the headwaters of the Kern River. The tree often occurs in forests with fir and hemlock species, especially those which are tolerant of shade. It benefits from disturbances that clear away competing species, including low fires that do not destroy all of its cone-protected seeds. It is also well adapted to poor, rocky soils.

== Ecology ==
Once abundant in northern Idaho, Western white pine's population was drastically affected from the late 19th century to the late 20th century by logging, wildfires, white pine blister rust, and a bark beetle epidemic. Since 1970, millions of Western white pine seedlings have been planted to make up for the losses.

The white pine blister rust (Cronartium ribicola) is a fungus that was accidentally introduced from Europe in 1909. The United States Forest Service estimates that 90% of the Western white pines have been killed by the blister rust west of the Cascades. Large stands have been succeeded by other pines or non-pine species. The rust has also killed much of the whitebark pine outside of California. Blister rust is less severe in California, and Western white and whitebark pines have survived there in great numbers.

Resistance to the blister rust is genetic; due to Western white pine's genetic variability, some individuals are relatively unaffected. The Forest Service has a program for locating and breeding rust-resistant Western white pine and sugar pine. Seedlings of these trees have been introduced into the wild.

== Uses ==
The gum was reportedly chewed by Native Americans to treat coughs. The pitch was used to fasten arrowheads and coat fishing and whaling instruments. European colonists used both Western and Eastern white pine as softwood lumber. Both species are considered excellent for molding and carving. First the Eastern and then the Western species were used in the building of transcontinental railroads in the late 19th century. In the early 20th century, white pine was used to build houses and make matches.

Western white pine is widely grown as an ornamental tree.
