= Col de la Pieres =

Mountain in Italy

- Col dala Piëres
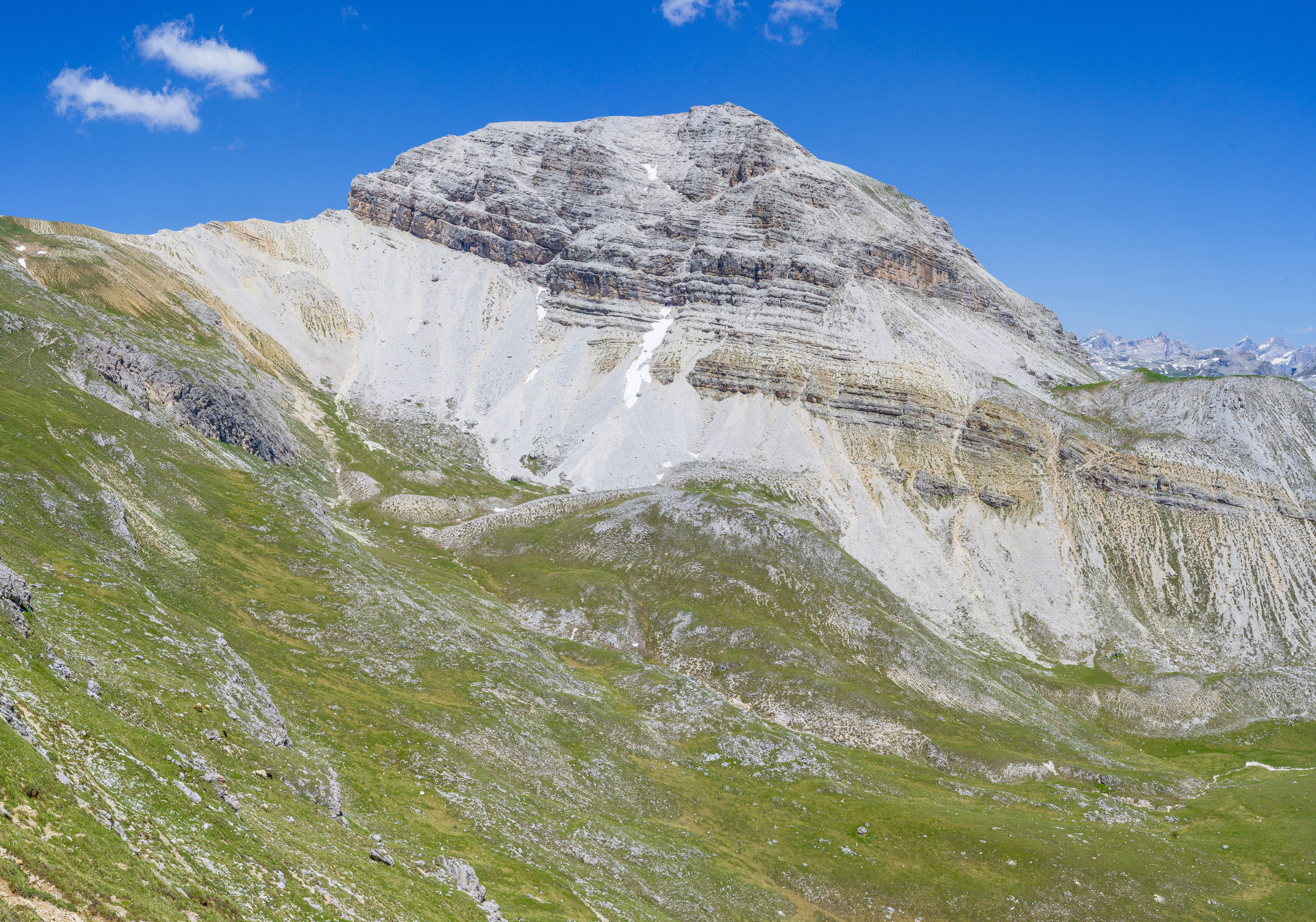
- Southwest aspect

Highest point
- Elevation: 2,751 m (9,026 ft)
- Prominence: 246 m (807 ft)
- Parent peak: Furchëta
- Isolation: 1.6 km (0.99 mi)
- Coordinates: 46°35′12″N 11°47′02″E

Geography
- Location within Italy
- Country: Italy
- Province: South Tyrol
- Protected area: Puez-Geisler Nature Park
- Parent range: Dolomites; Puez Group
- Topo map: Tabacco 05 Val Gardena / Alpe di Siusi (Gröden / Seiser Alm

Geology
- Rock age: Triassic
- Rock type: Dolomite

Col de la Pieres, also spelled Col dala Piëres, is a mountain in the province of South Tyrol in northern Italy.

== Description ==
Col de la Pieres is a 2,751-meter-elevation (9,026-foot) summit in the Puez Group of the Dolomites, a UNESCO World Heritage Site. Set in the Trentino-Alto Adige/Südtirol region, the peak is located 3.5 kilometers (2.2 miles) north-northeast of the village of Santa Cristina Gherdëina, in Puez-Geisler Nature Park. Precipitation runoff from the mountain's slopes drains into tributaries of the Derjon. Topographic relief is significant as the summit rises 1,000 meters (3,281 feet) along the Langental-Vallelunga Valley in approximately 1.5 kilometers (0.93 mile). The nearest higher neighbor is Piz Duleda, 1.7 kilometers (1.05 miles) to the north-northeast.

== Climate ==
Based on the Köppen climate classification, Col de la Pieres is located in an alpine climate zone with long, cold winters, and short, mild summers. Weather systems are forced upwards by the mountains (orographic lift), causing moisture to drop in the form of rain and snow. The months of June through September offer the most favorable weather for visiting or climbing in this area.

== Gallery ==
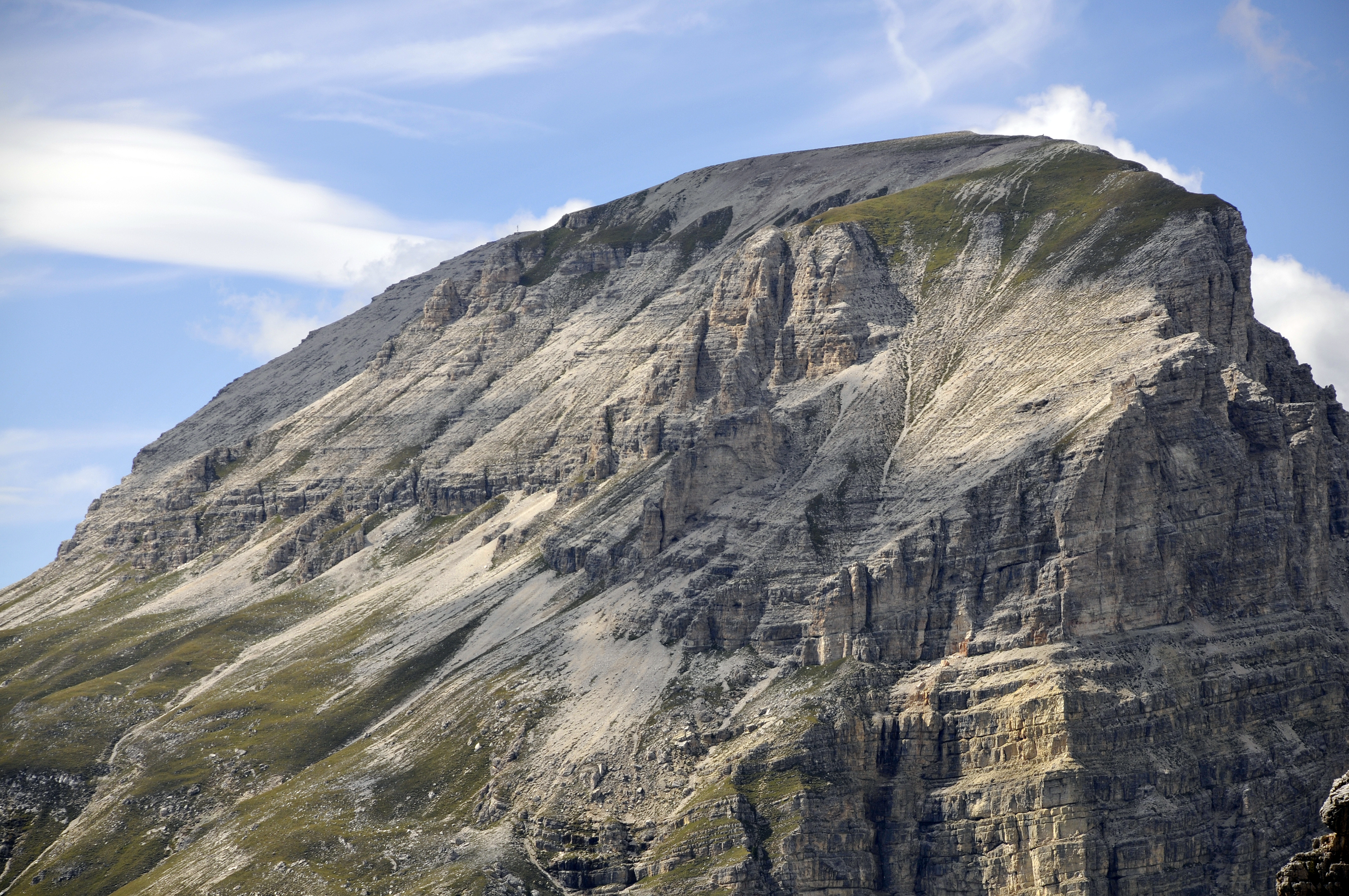

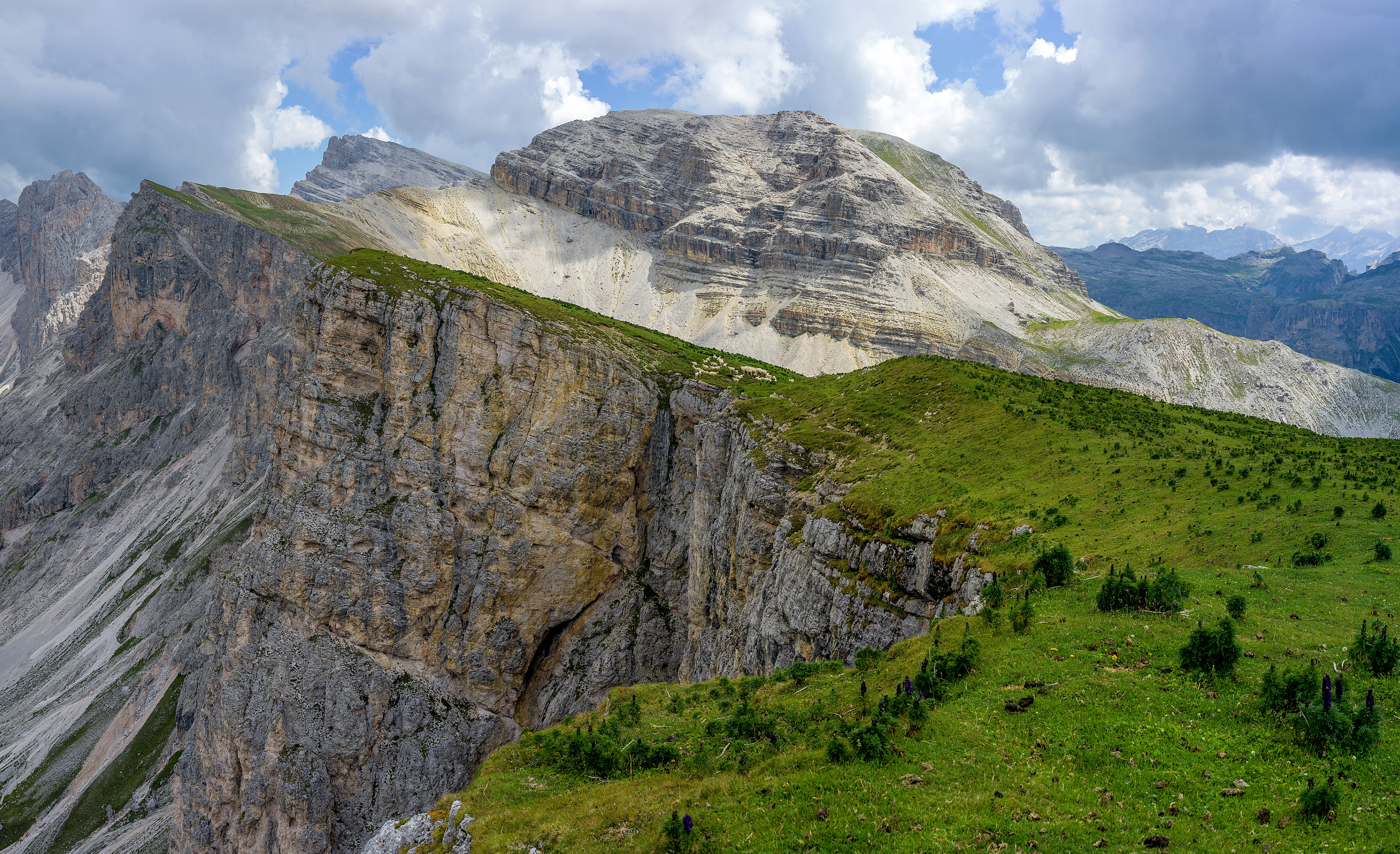
Southwest aspect

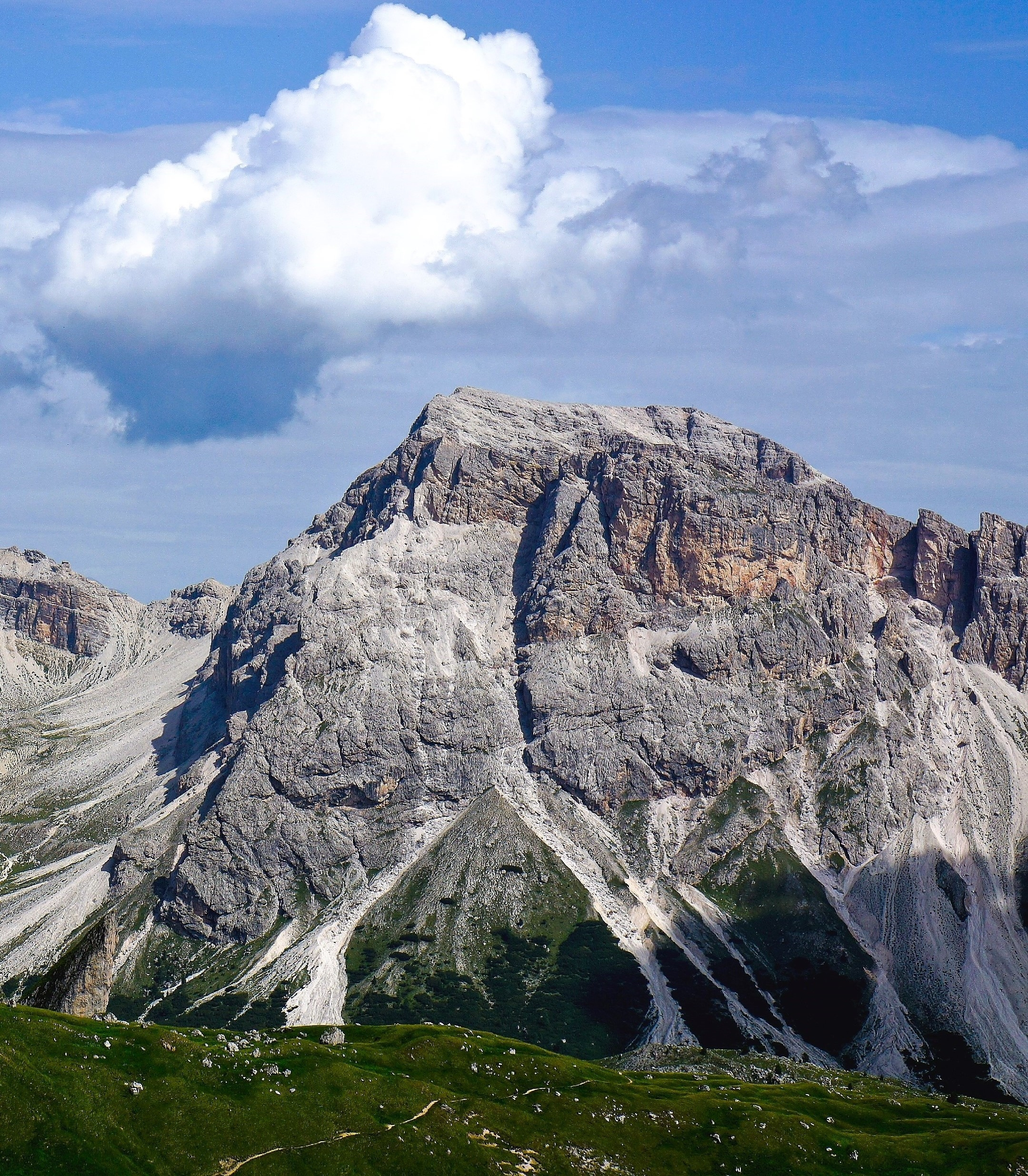
West aspect

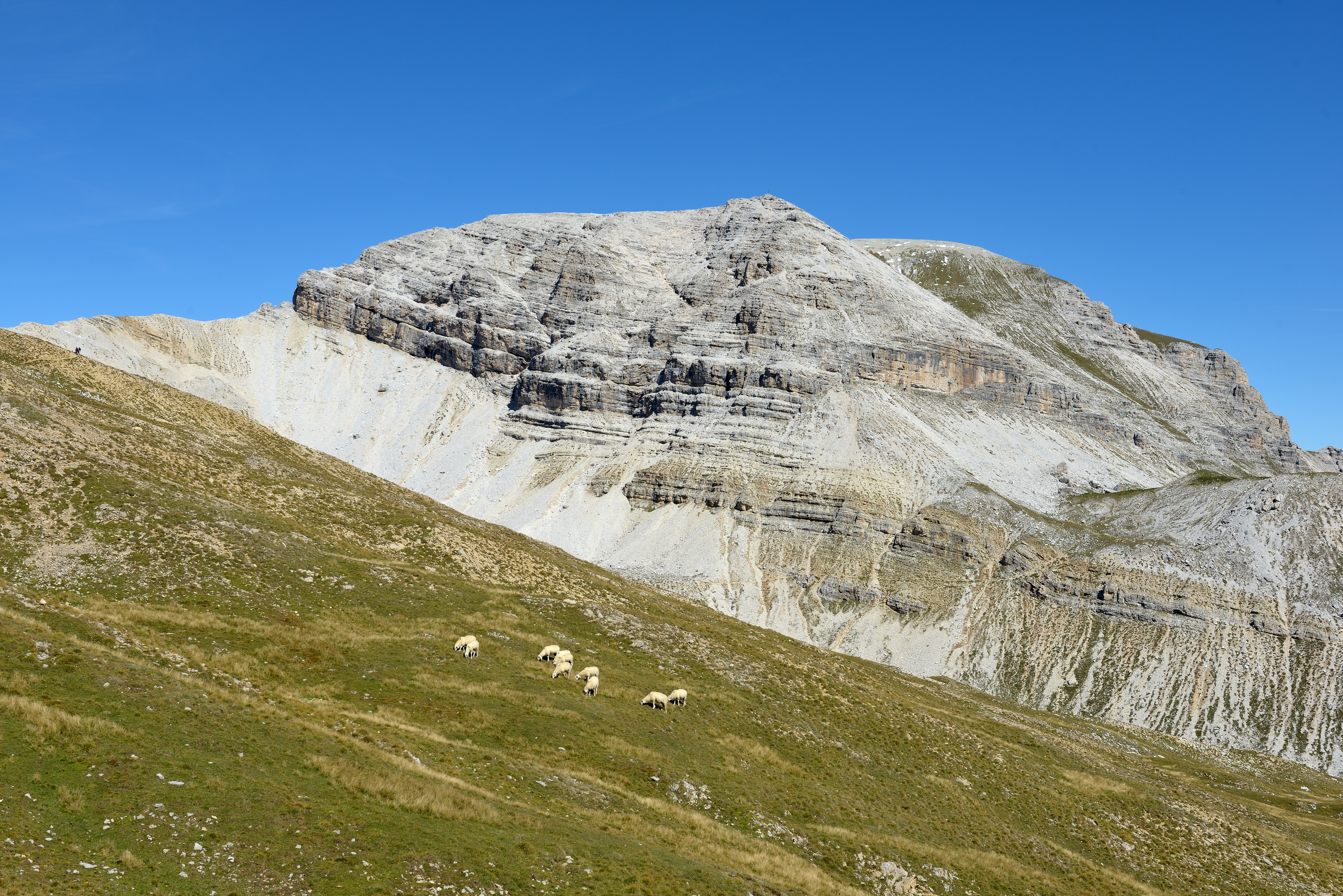

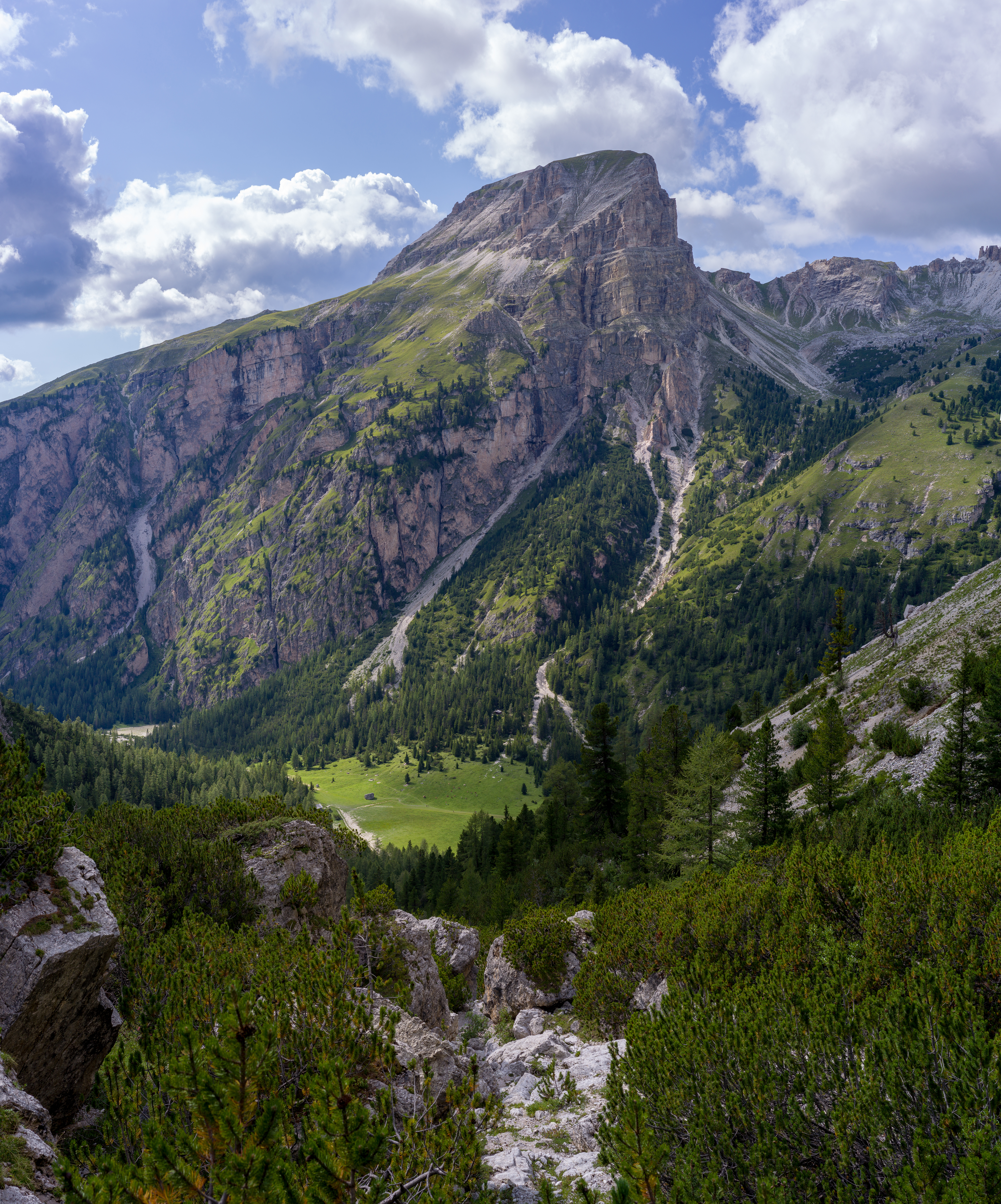
East aspect

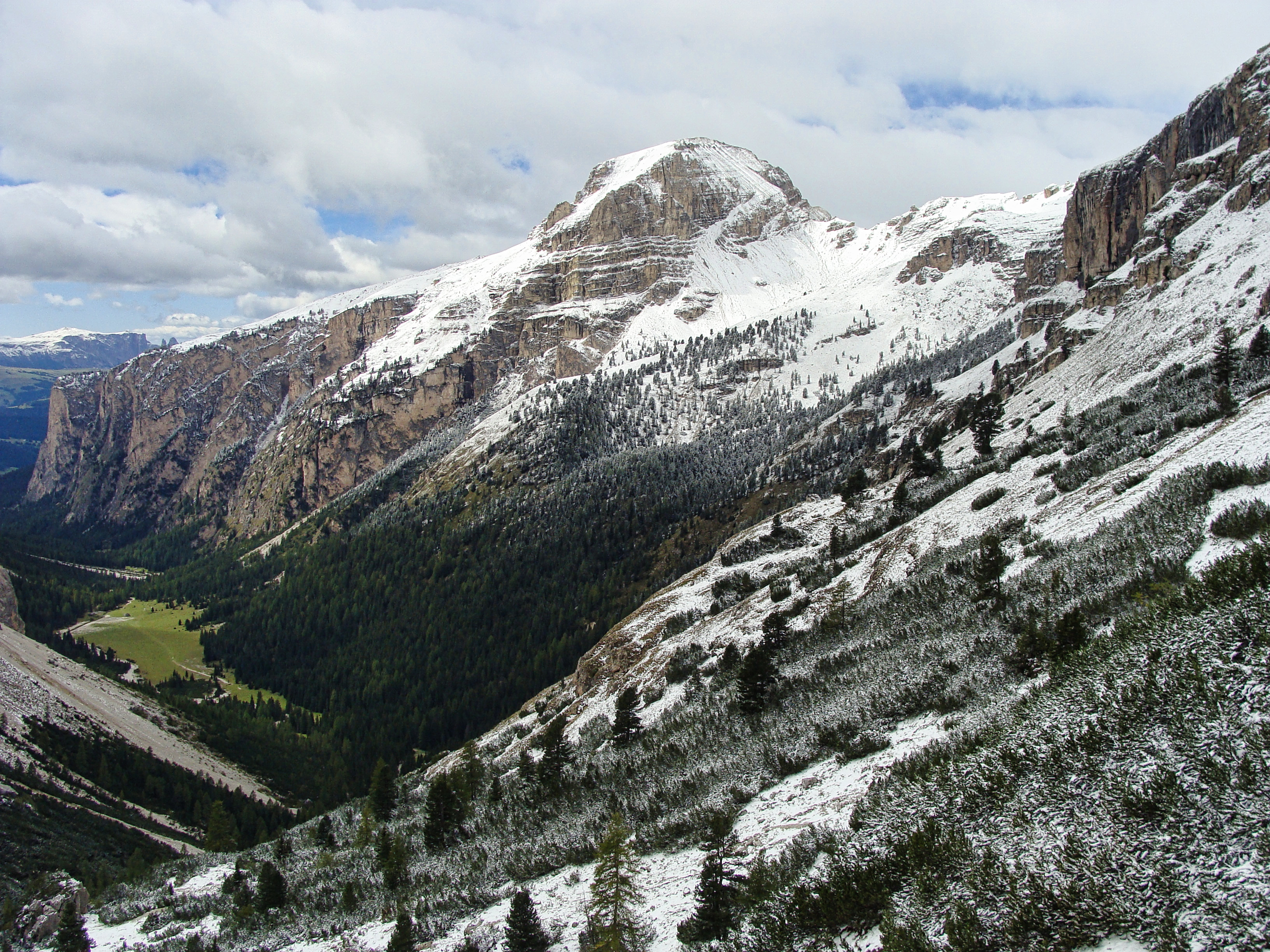
Northeast aspect

== See also ==
- Southern Limestone Alps
