= Lech Sant =

Alpine lake in South Tyrol, Italy

Lake Santo Lech Sant
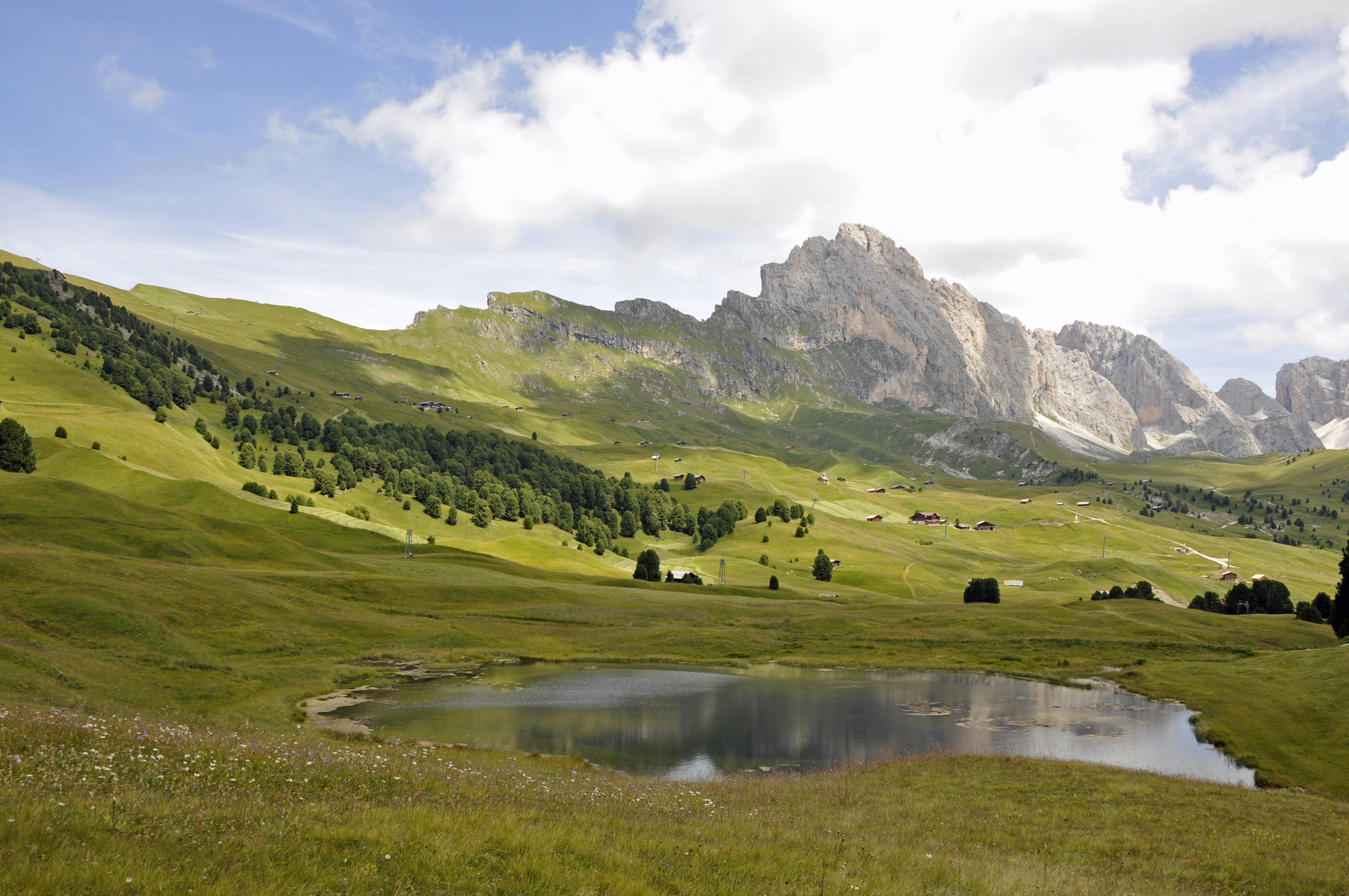
- The Lech Sant with the Stevia and Odle

- Location within Italy
- Location: Santa Cristina Gherdëina, South Tyrol, Italy
- Coordinates: 46°35′12″N 11°43′46″E
- Basin countries: Italy

The Lech Sant (Lech Sant in Ladin, Lago Santo in Italian) is a lake, protected natural monument in South Tyrol, located in the municipality of Santa Cristina Gherdëina.

== Name origin ==
Lech Sant translated into English becomes Holy Lake and the origin of this name is linked to a popular legend.

== History ==
Geological and archaeological research conducted in 1984 uncovered two distinct prehistoric stratifications on the site, dating respectively to the Bronze Age and the Iron Age. It seems plausible to assume that the site was used during these periods by the earliest populations of the area as an ancient place of worship.

== Description ==
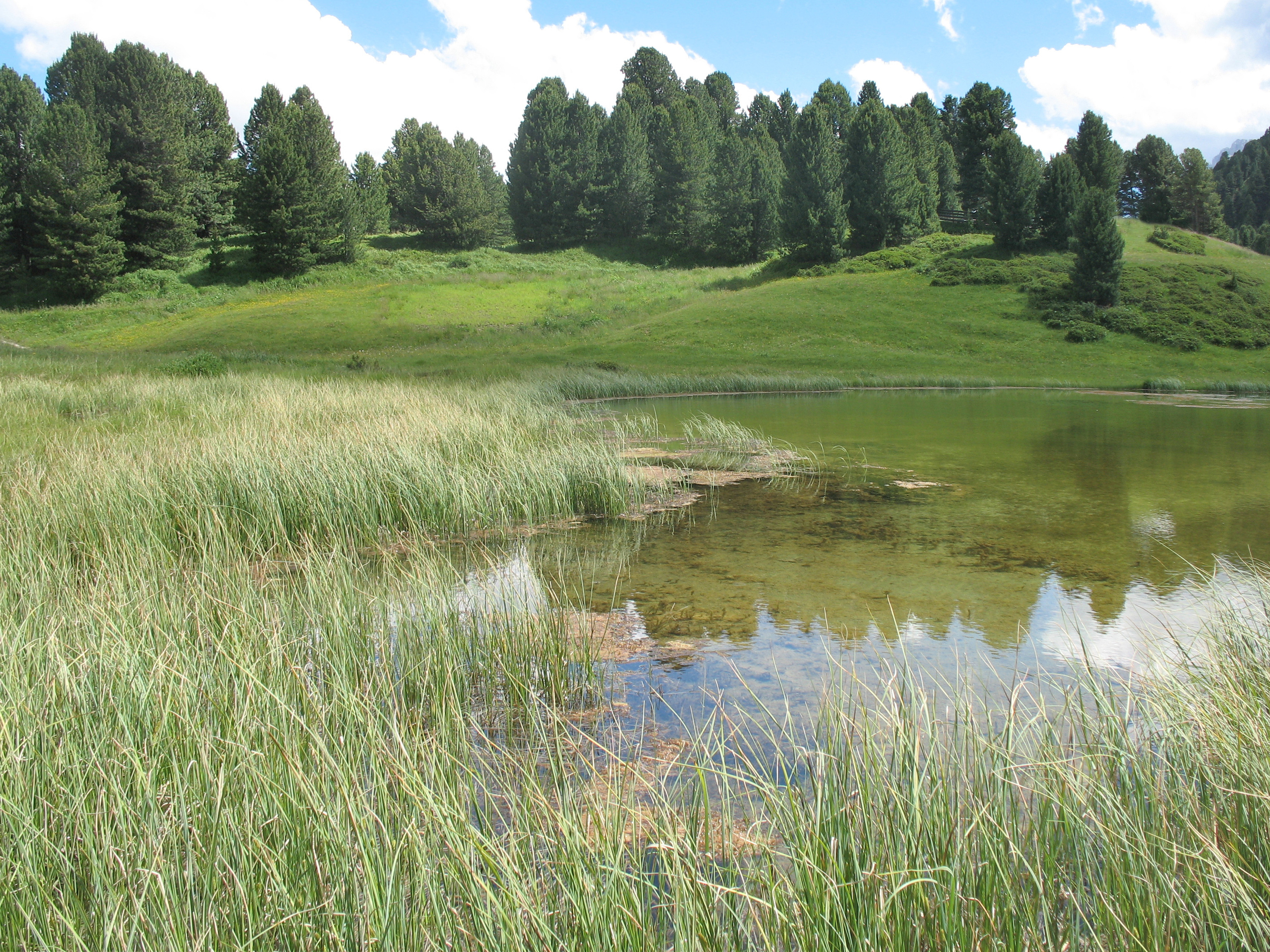
Zone of the Lake Santo biotope.

The small mountain lake is located on the Alpe di Mastlè, above the settlement of Santa Cristina.

== Biotope ==
The biotope is notable for its location and biodiversity. Its origins date back to after the Würm glaciation and its waters are home to the minnow, a small freshwater fish adapted to cold, oxygenated waters.

== Legend ==
According to popular tradition, long ago where the lake now stands, there was a small church. Some local shepherds are said to have desecrated the sacred site with their nocturnal festivities and, as punishment, were made to sink along with the entire church, giving rise to the depression that later became the lake.

== See also ==
- Dolomites
- Val Gardena
- Puez-Geisler Nature Park

== Bibliography ==
- Touring Club Italiano (2005). Trentino Alto Adige (in Italian). Milan: Touring Editore. ISBN 978-88-365-4802-6.
- Moroder, Edgar (1988). Calendar de Gherdëina 1988 [Calendar 1988] (in Ladin). Ortisei: Union di Ladins d'Urtisei. OCLC 48996921.
