= Piz Duleda =

Mountain in Italy

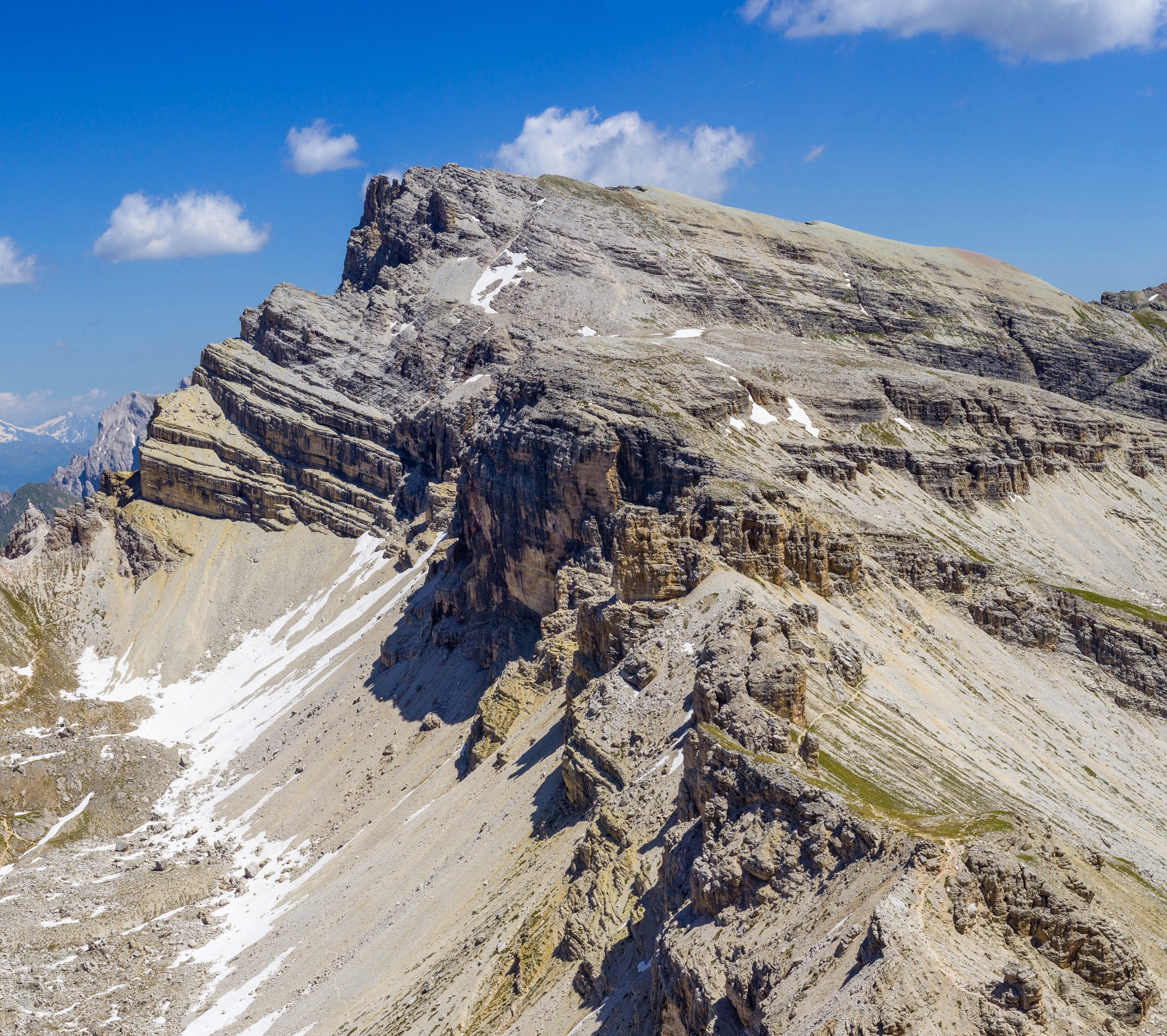
- Southwest aspect

Highest point
- Elevation: 2,909 m (9,544 ft)
- Prominence: 183 m (600 ft)
- Parent peak: Piz de Puez
- Isolation: 1.1 km (0.68 mi)
- Coordinates: 46°36′02″N 11°47′47″E

Geography
- Location within Italy Location within Alps
- Interactive map of Piz Duleda
- Country: Italy
- Province: South Tyrol
- Protected area: Puez-Geisler Nature Park
- Parent range: Dolomites; Puez Group
- Topo map: Tabacco 05 Val Gardena / Alpe di Siusi (Gröden / Seiser Alm

Geology
- Rock age: Triassic
- Rock type: Dolomite

Climbing
- First ascent: 1887

Piz Duleda is a mountain in the province of South Tyrol in northern Italy.

== Description ==
Piz Duleda is a 2,909-meter-elevation (9,544-foot) summit in the Dolomites, a UNESCO World Heritage Site. It ranks as the third-highest peak in the Puez Group of the Dolomites. Set in the Trentino-Alto Adige/Südtirol region, the peak is located six kilometers (3.7 miles) northeast of the village of Santa Cristina Gherdëina, within Puez-Geisler Nature Park. Precipitation runoff from the mountain's southern slopes drains into tributaries of the Derjon, whereas the north slope drains to the Gran Ega. Topographic relief is significant as the summit rises 900 meters (2,952 feet) along the north slope in one kilometer (0.6 mile), and 1,100 meters (3,609 feet) above the Langental-Vallelunga Valley in approximately 2.5 kilometers (1.55 miles). The nearest higher neighbor is Piz de Puez, 1.1 kilometers (0.7 mile) to the east. The first documented ascent of Piz Duleda was accomplished on September 6, 1887, by Luigi Bernard and Heinrich Willi Meuser via the south ridge. Piz is the Italian word for peak, and the word Duleda derives from the Ladin verb dulè, meaning hewn or cut back, which refers to the shape of the rocks.

== Climate ==
Based on the Köppen climate classification, Piz Duleda is located in an alpine climate zone with long, cold winters, and short, mild summers. Weather systems are forced upwards by the mountains (orographic lift), causing moisture to drop in the form of rain and snow. The months of June through September offer the most favorable weather for visiting or climbing in this area.

== Gallery ==
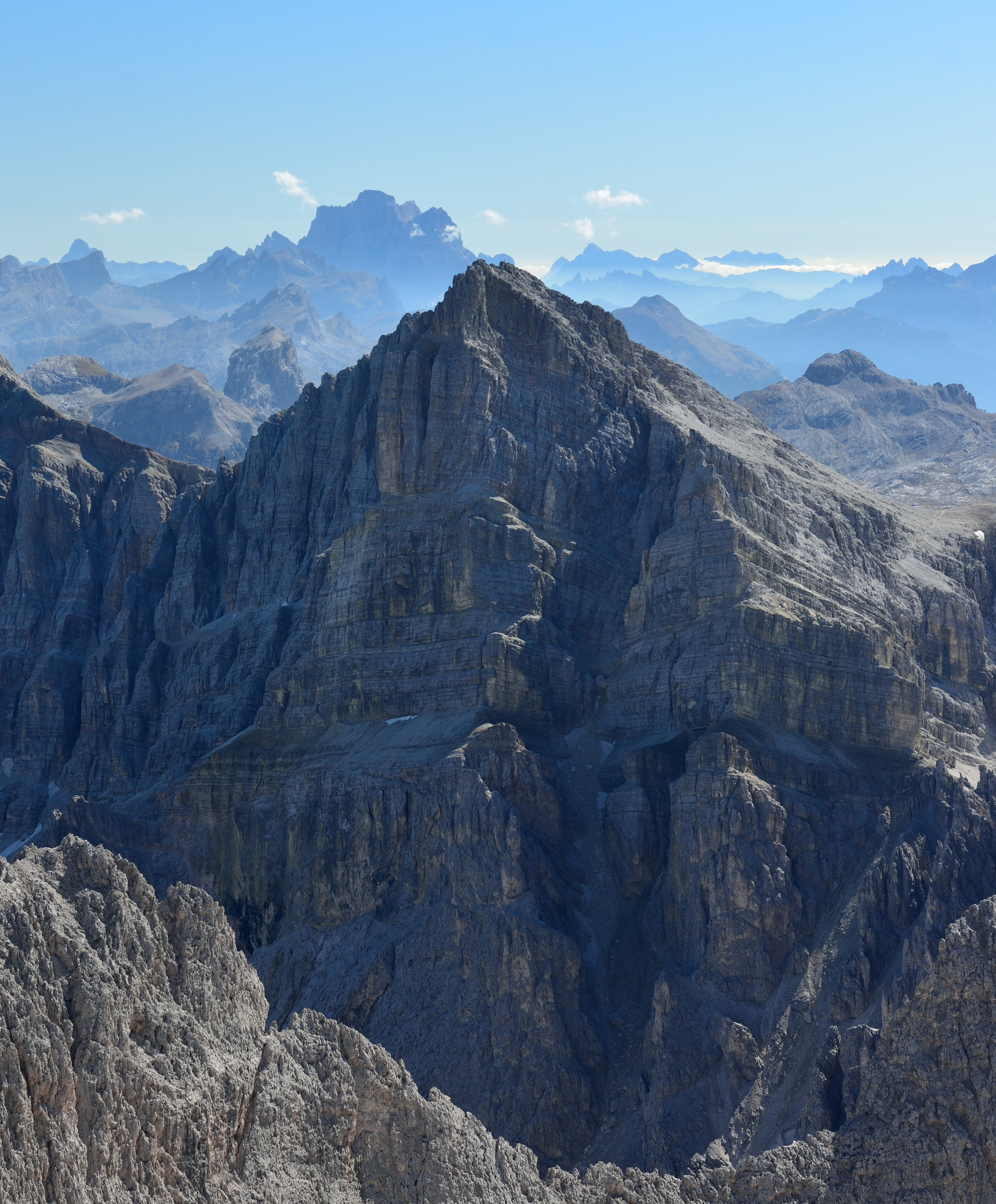
Northwest aspect

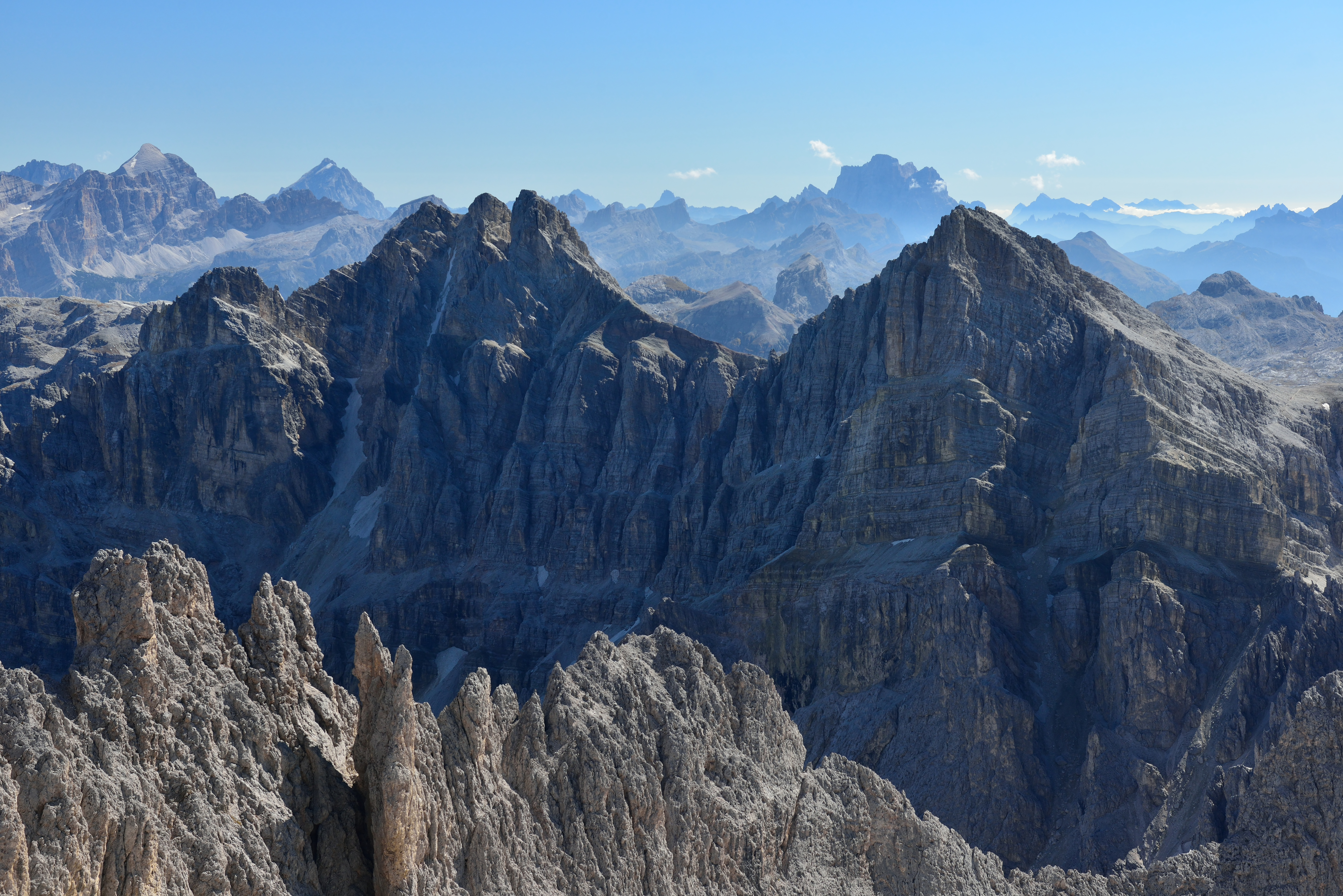
Piz de Puez (left) and Piz Duleda (right) from northwest

Piz Duleda (left of center) and Piz de Puez to right of center

== See also ==
- Southern Limestone Alps
