= Piz de Puez =

Mountain in Italy

- German: Westliche Puezspitze
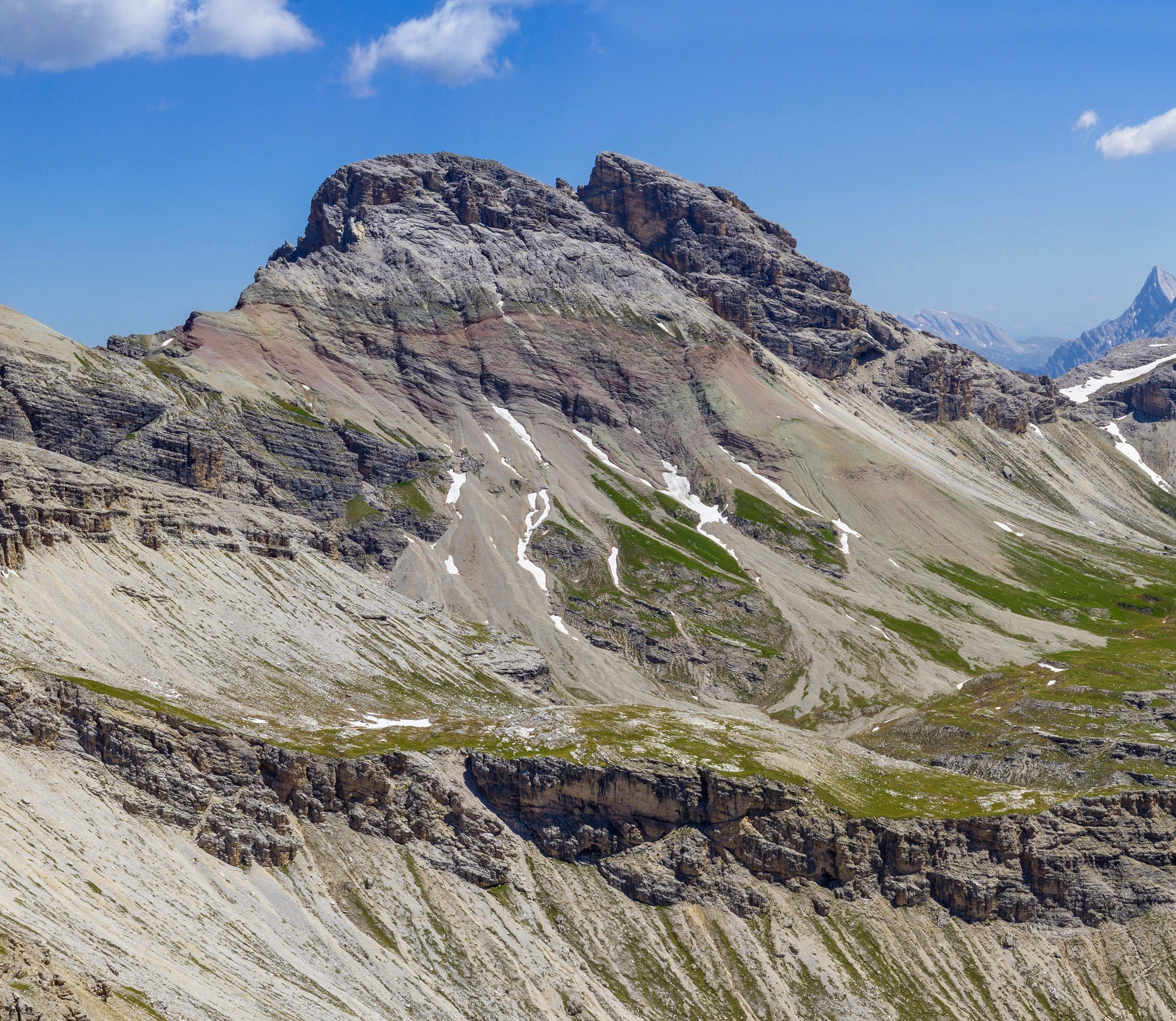
- Southwest aspect

Highest point
- Elevation: 2,918 m (9,573 ft)
- Prominence: 301 m (988 ft)
- Parent peak: Furchëta
- Isolation: 2.73 km (1.70 mi)
- Coordinates: 46°35′55″N 11°48′39″E

Geography
- Location within Italy Location within Alps
- Interactive map of Piz de Puez
- Country: Italy
- Province: South Tyrol
- Protected area: Puez-Geisler Nature Park
- Parent range: Dolomites; Puez Group
- Topo map: Tabacco 05 Val Gardena / Alpe di Siusi (Gröden / Seiser Alm

Geology
- Rock age: Triassic
- Rock type: Dolomite

Climbing
- First ascent: < 1888

Piz de Puez, also known as Westliche Puezspitze in German, is a mountain in the province of South Tyrol in northern Italy.

== Description ==
Piz de Puez is a 2,918-meter-elevation (9,573-foot) summit in the Dolomites, a UNESCO World Heritage Site. It is the highest peak in the Puez Group of the Dolomites. Set in the Trentino-Alto Adige/Südtirol region, the peak is located six kilometers (3.7 miles) northeast of the village of Sëlva, within Puez-Geisler Nature Park. Precipitation runoff from the mountain's south slope drains into tributaries of the Derjon, whereas the northern slopes drain to the Gran Ega. Topographic relief is significant as the summit rises 920 meters (3,018 feet) along the north slope in one kilometer (0.6 mile), and 1,100 meters (3,609 feet) above the Langental-Vallelunga Valley in approximately two kilometers (1.24 miles). The nearest higher neighbor is Sass da l'Ega, 2.7 kilometers (1.7 miles) to the west-northwest. The first documented ascent of the true summit of Piz de Puez was made on September 6, 1888, by A. Demetz and Karl Schulz. The slightly lower East Peak (2,913 m) was climbed on September 4, 1886, by Willi Meuser and Giovanni Battista Vinatzer, however both summits were likely already reached by Ladin hunters and by Giovanni Battista Alton at prior unknown dates.

== Climate ==
Based on the Köppen climate classification, Piz de Puez is located in an alpine climate zone with long, cold winters, and short, mild summers. Weather systems are forced upwards by the mountains (orographic lift), causing moisture to drop in the form of rain and snow. The months of June through September offer the most favorable weather for visiting or climbing in this area.

== Gallery ==
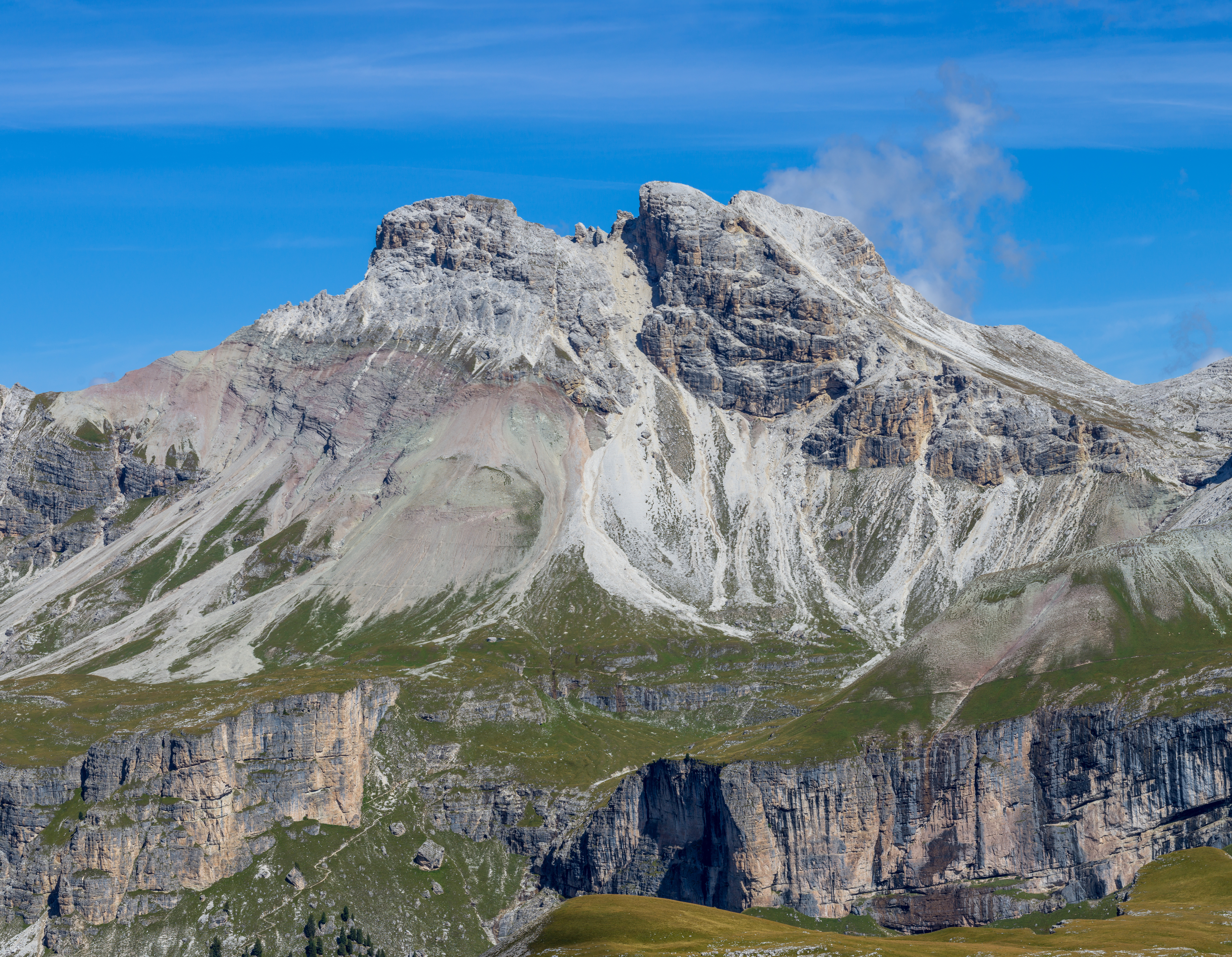
South aspect

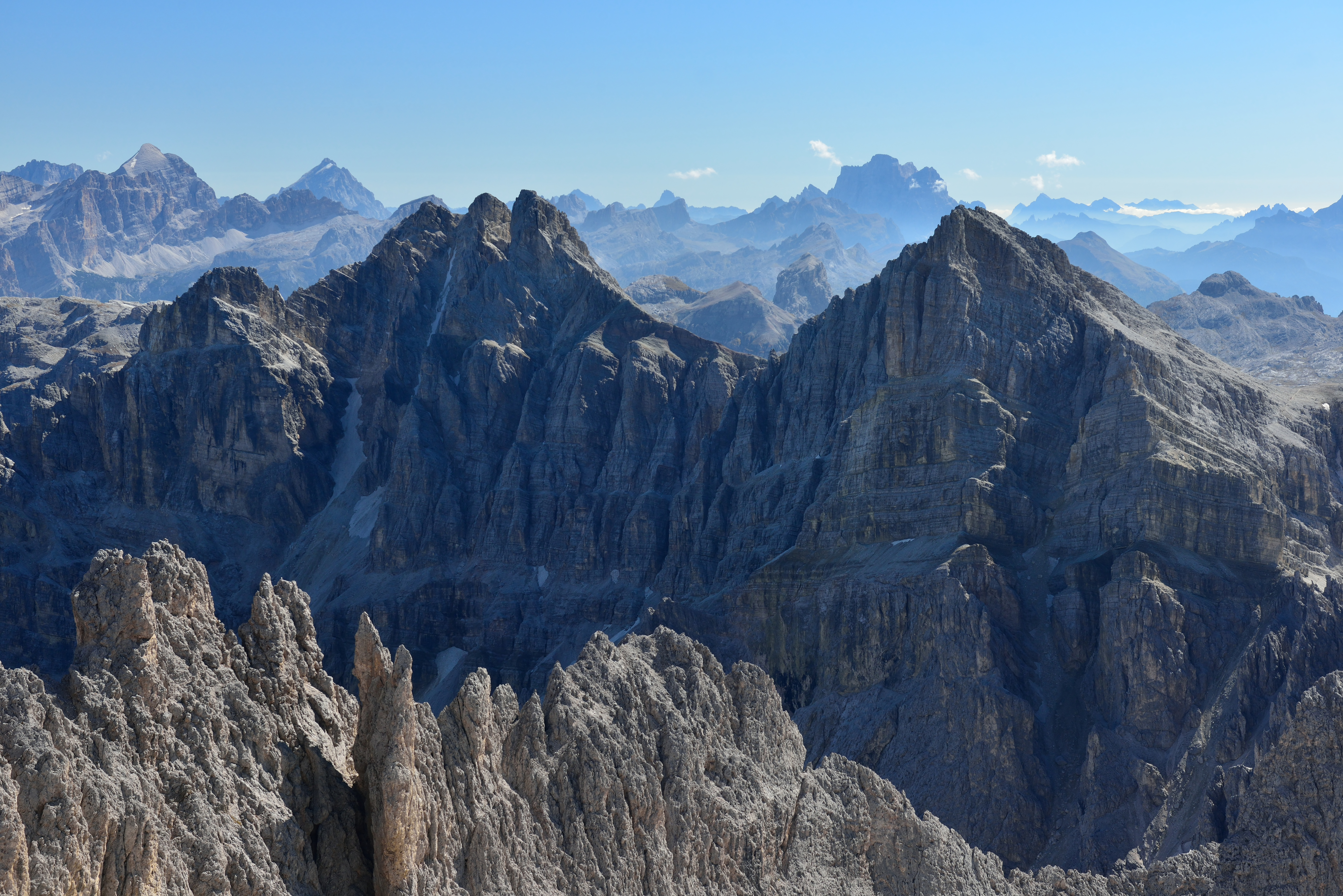
Piz de Puez (left) and Piz Duleda (right) from northwest

Piz Duleda (left of center) and Piz de Puez to right of center

== See also ==
- Southern Limestone Alps
