= Val Gardena =

Valley in the Dolomites, South Tyrol, Italy

Coordinates: 46°33′36″N 11°42′17″E

Location in Italy

Val Gardena (Italian: [ˌval ɡarˈdeːna, ˌval ɡarˈdɛːna]; German: Gröden [ˈɡʁøːdn̩]; Ladin: Gherdëina [ɡʀ̩ˈdɜi̯na]) is a valley in the Dolomites of South Tyrol, Northern Italy. It is best known as a tourist skiing, rock climbing, and woodcarving area.

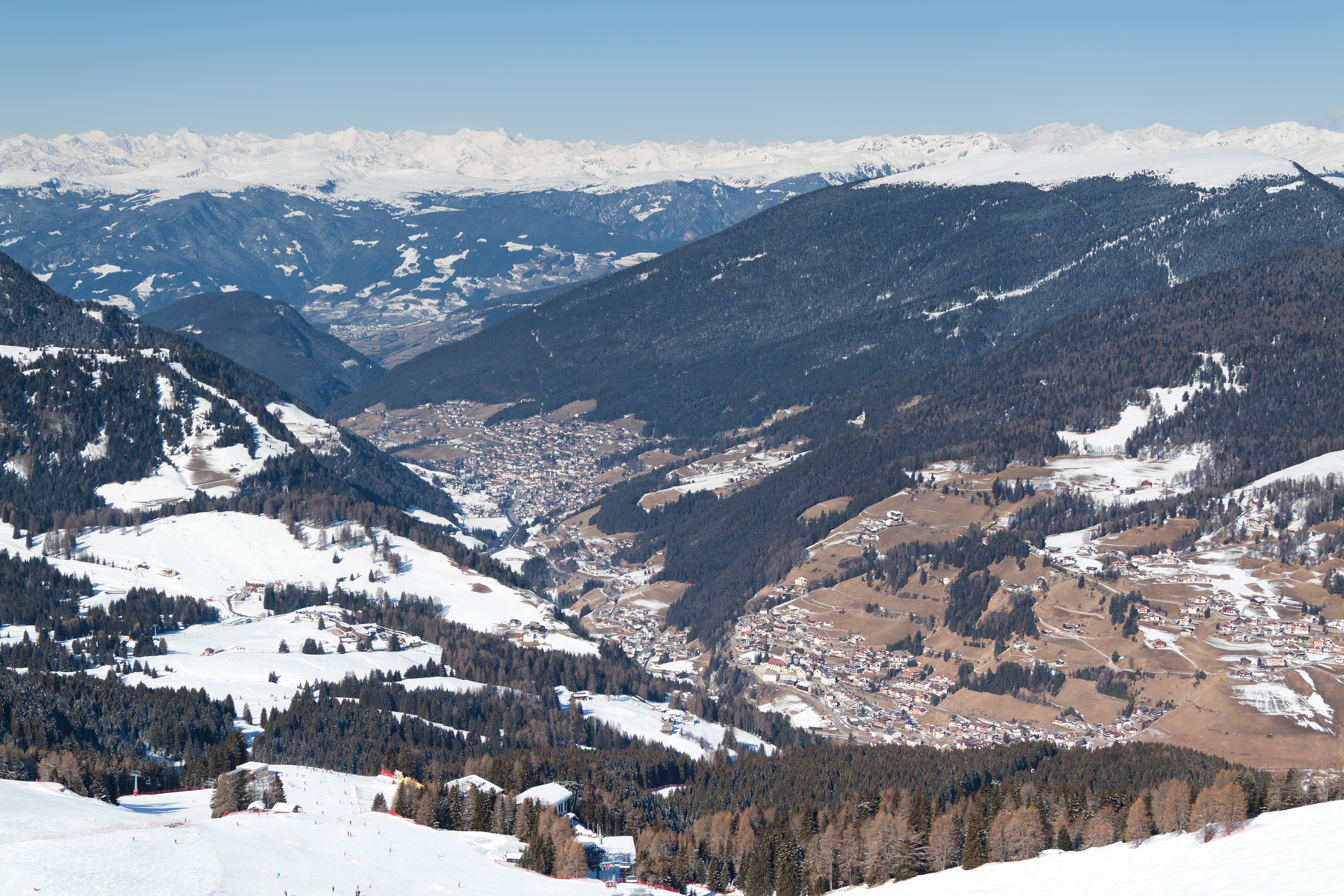

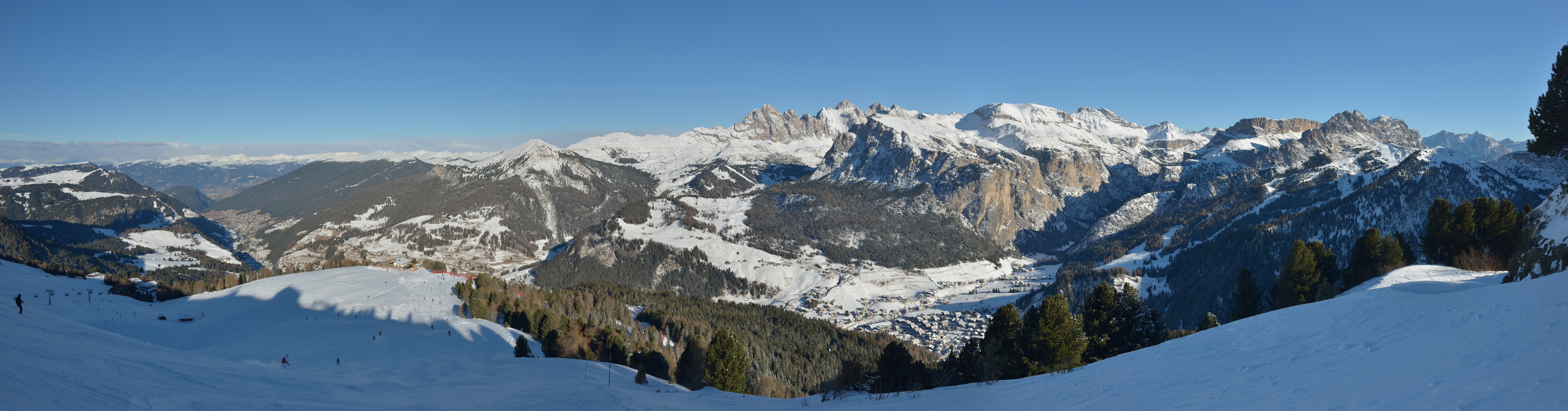
View of the northern side of the valley

== Geography ==
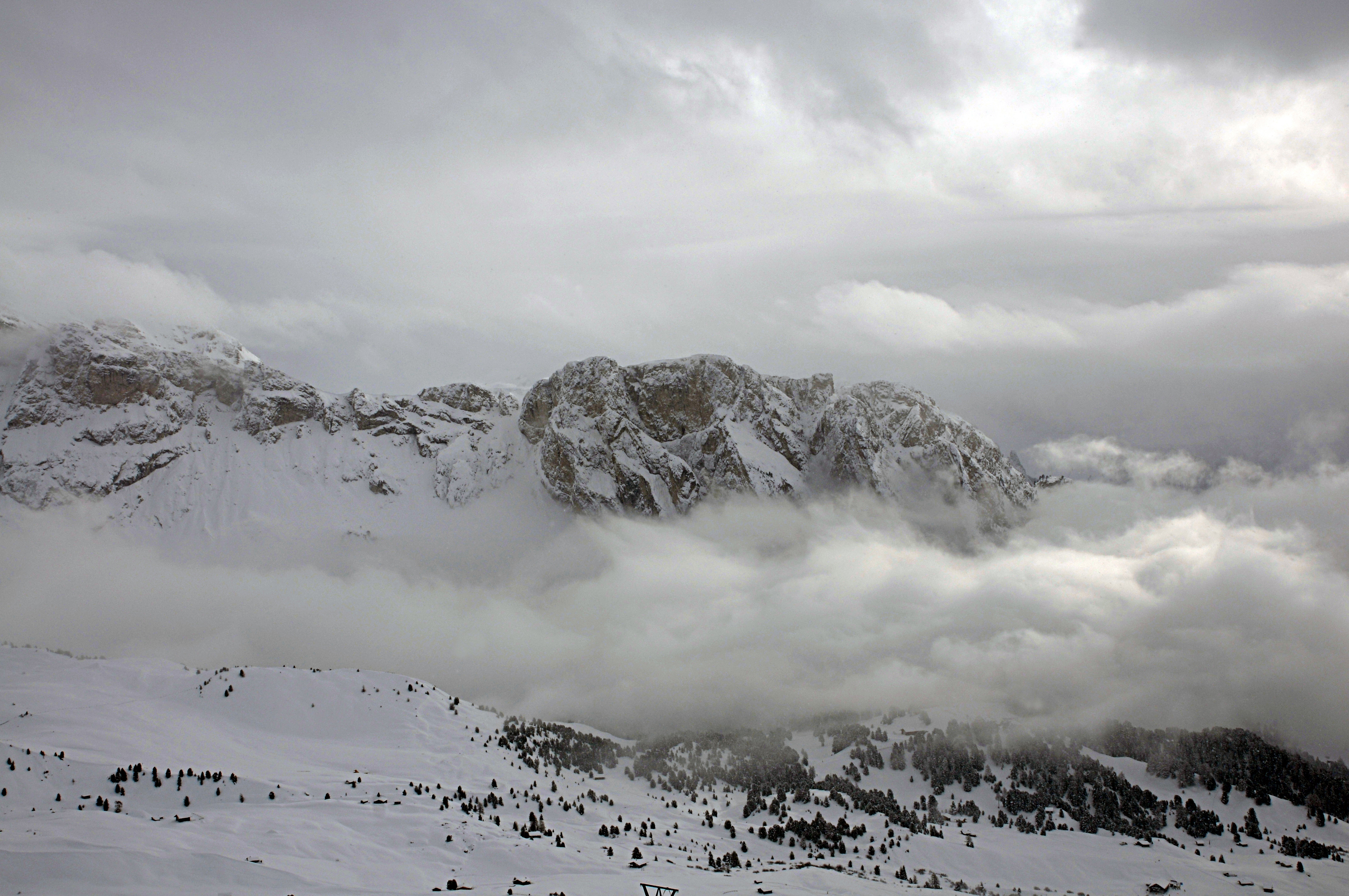
The Stevia range above Val Gardena

The valley's main river is the Derjon, a tributary of the Eisack river. The mountains that surround the valley are formed by dolomite rocks, which confer on them a characteristic appearance. Most of the steep slopes are covered by pine woods. The favoured cultivations are barley, rye, potatoes, flax, buckwheat. The three municipalities in Val Gardena are Urtijëi, Sëlva, and Santa Cristina; they were served by the Val Gardena Railway from 1916 until 1960.

== History ==
The first document about Val Gardena dates back to 993/94–1005: in a tradition note of the diocese of Freising, the Bavarian Count Otto from the Rapoton family transferred, among other things, "ad Gredine forestum" (forest area in Val Gardena) to Bishop Gottschalk of Freising.

== Culture ==
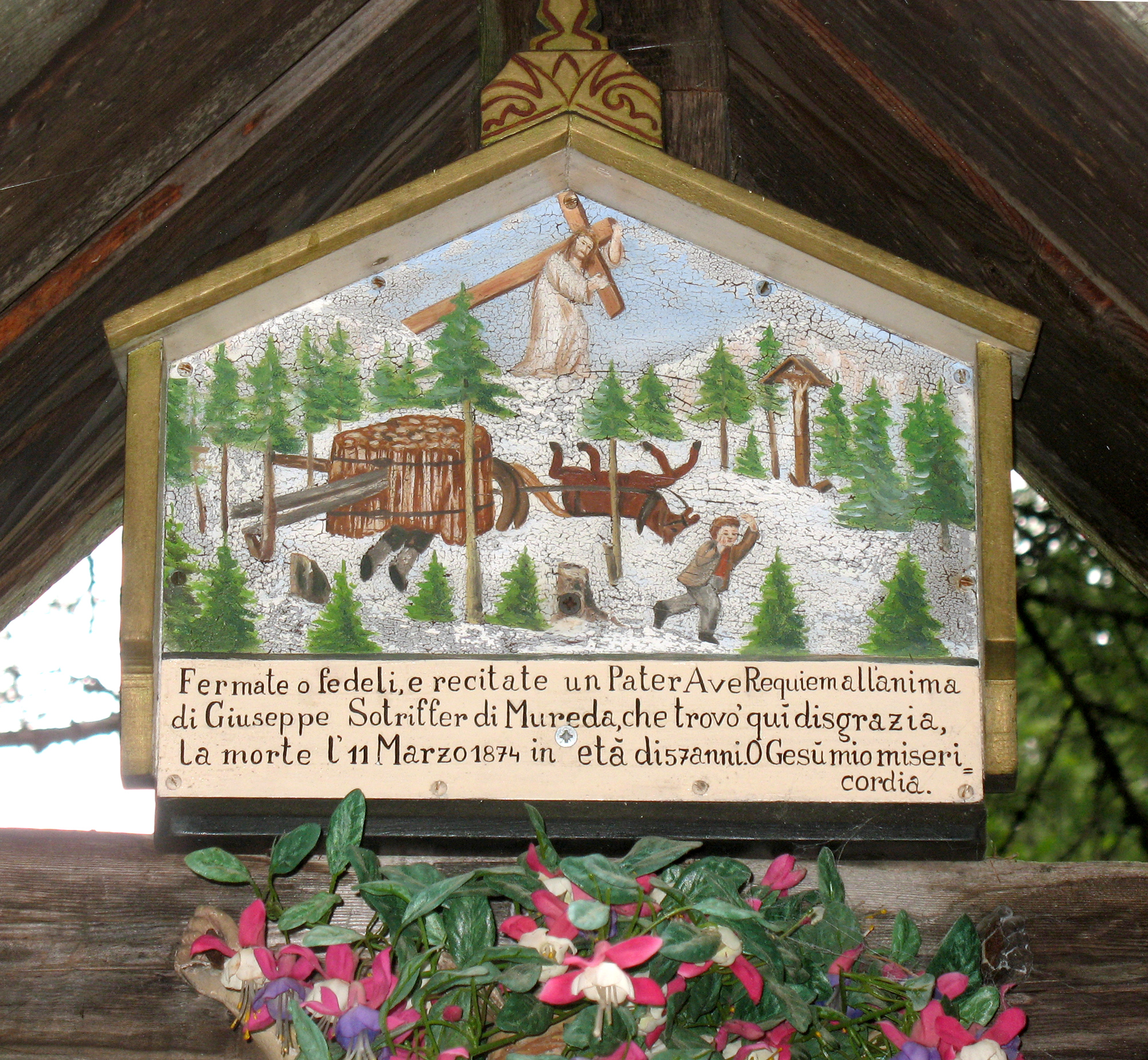
Accidents like the one depicted were frequent among the farmers collecting timber in the woods during harsh winters in Val Gardena.

Val Gardena is one of five valleys with a majority of Ladin speakers (two of these valleys are in South Tyrol). The form of the Ladin language spoken in this valley is called Gardenese in Italian, Grödnerisch in German and Gherdëina in Ladin.

=== Woodcarving ===
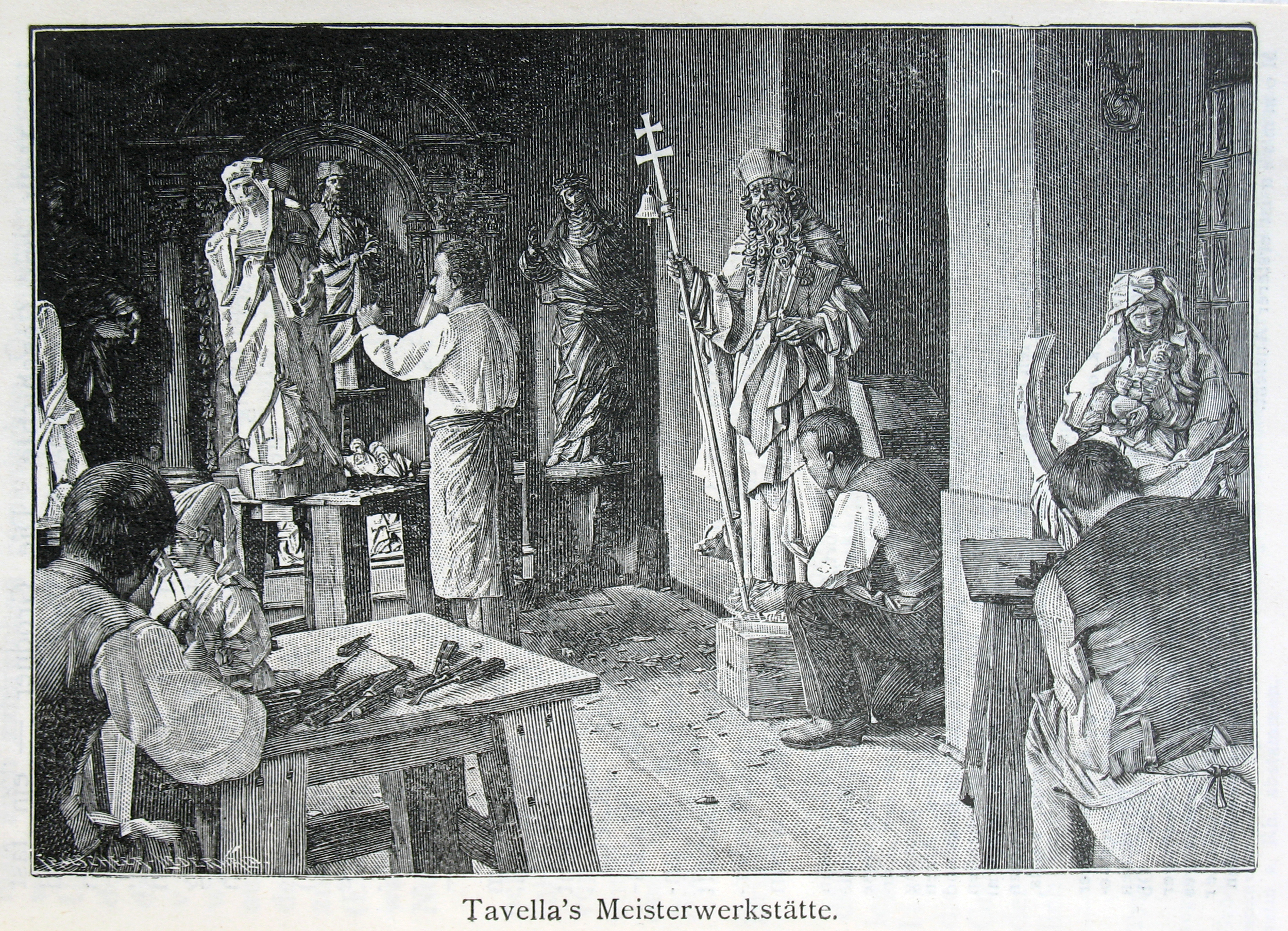
Woodcarving in Val Gardena. Around 1900 when carving of statues of Catholic saints was at its bloom.

The woodcarving industry has flourished in Val Gardena since the 17th century. Since the 19th century, statues and altars carved in the area have been shipped to Catholic Churches throughout the world. In the 18th century, besides religious statuettes, the production of woodcarved figurines of genre art was widespread in the valley. Among them statuettes of beggars generally in pairs (female and male), four seasons, watchstands were very popular. In the 19th and 20th century, carving of wooden toys was such a widespread occupation in all Val Gardena families that Amelia Edwards called Urtijëi the "capital of Toyland". One of the valley's best-known products is the peg wooden doll which was popular all over Europe and America in the 19th century.

In one of her many trips Margaret Warner Morley went to Europe to Val Gardena where she was inspired to write the novel Donkey John of the toy valley.

The Parish Church of Urtijëi displays a rich collection of statues carved by local artists in the last two centuries. The Museum Gherdëina in Urtijëi owns a rich collection of historical wooden toys, and woodcarved statues and figurines.

== Sports ==
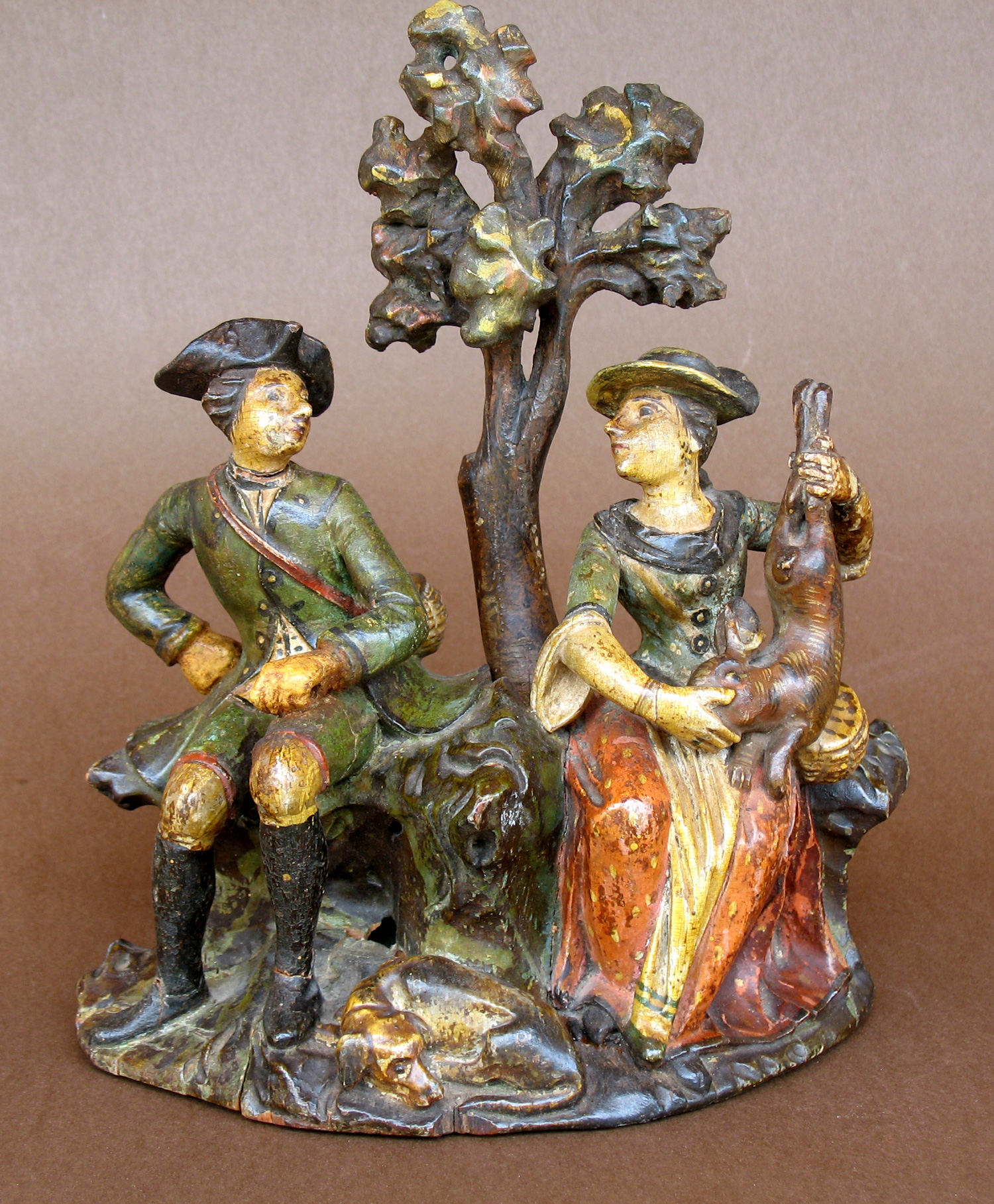
Carved gallant genre scene in Swiss Pine with figurines from Val Gardena 18th century

=== Skiing ===
The valley hosted the FIS Alpine World Ski Championships in 1970.

Val Gardena is home to the Saslong Classic, a men's World Cup downhill race that has been held almost every year since 1969. Since 2002 (and in 1983), the downhill has been paired with a Super-G race, and from 1979 to 1982 a combined event was held. The Saslong course is considered one of the five "classic" men's downhill races, along with Garmisch-Partenkirchen's Kandahar (GER), Kitzbühel's Hahnenkamm (AUT), Wengen's Lauberhorn (SUI), and Val-d'Isère's Criterium (FRA). It is well known for the "Camel Humps" (or "Bumps"), a series of three small jumps which racers must negotiate in quick succession. Two men have won the Saslong title four times in a career: Austrian Franz Klammer (1975, two races in 1976, and 1982) and Italy's Kristian Ghedina (1996, 1998, 1999, and 2001). If Super-G wins are also included, two other men have matched that feat: Peter Müller of Switzerland and Austrian Michael Walchhofer.

A women's slalom and parallel slalom were also held in 1975.

Val Gardena is part of the Sella Ronda alpine ski touring circuit.

=== Other sports ===
The Gardena Spring Trophy is an annual international figure skating competition held every spring in the Valley.

Val Gardena has a Serie A ice hockey team, the Hockey Club Gardena.

== Notable residents ==
- Carolina Kostner, figure skater
- Isolde Kostner, ski-champion
- Giorgio Moroder, record producer, songwriter, performer and DJ
- Josef Moroder-Lusenberg, painter

== See also ==
- Woodcarved beggars

== General sources ==
- Amelia Edwards. Untrodden peaks and unfrequented valleys. A midsummer ramble in the Dolomites. Longman's, Green and Co. London 1873.
- Margaret Warner Morley. Donkey John of the toy valley. Chicago A. C. McClurg & Co. 1909.
