= Woodcarved beggars =

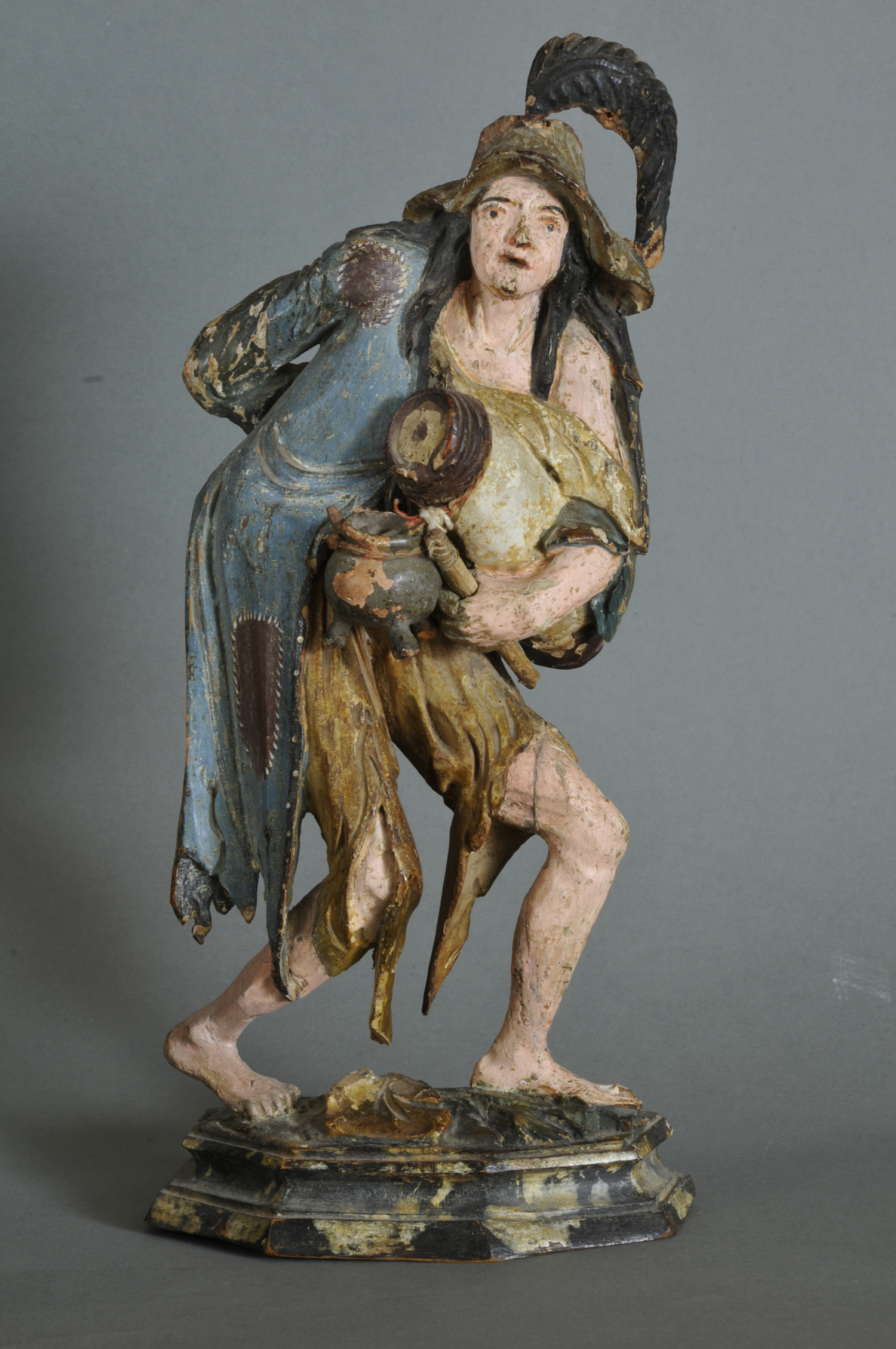
Beggar carved and painted with bagpipe and pot

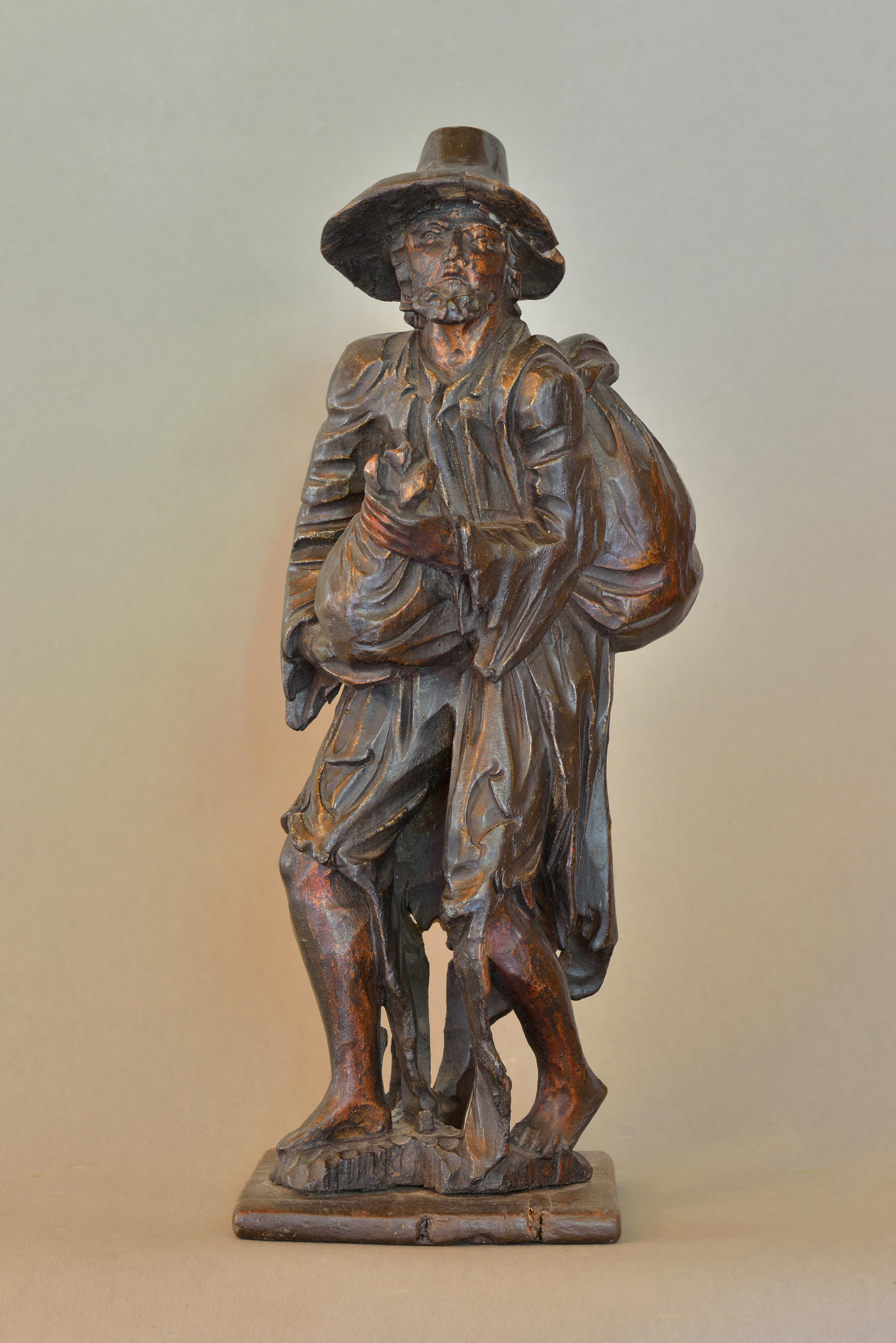
A male beggar from Gröden

Woodcarved Beggars originated as figures carved mostly in swiss pine, painted, or stained dark brown, generally from Gröden - Val Gardena in the Alps.

In Val Gardena, the carving industry began as early as at the beginning of the 17th century. The woodcarvers produced mainly statues for churches and religious figurines. The production of beggars started in the late 17th century. Beggars were part of the rich production from Gröden of figurines of genre art as the figurines representing the four seasons. In the baroque period (17th–18th century), the production of those figurines was very rich; Gröden counted up to 300 carvers. The woodcarving production was sold through a network of merchants originating from Gröden and residing in most of the major European cities. The last production of beggars ended in the beginning of the 19th century when the carving of wooden toys prevailed in the valley.

The beggars come mostly in pairs—one female and one male. The female beggar carries a bag or an old musical instrument (hurdy-gurdy), and the man a stolen baby and something on his back as a back basket.

In the antique market, these figurines are often referred to as southern German, although the region of origin is located in the former Austrian Tyrol, now South Tyrol in Italy.

An important collection of these figurines is on display at the Museum Gröden in Urtijëi - Gröden. Other museums also have some of these figurines on display, like the Civic Museum in Bolzano, the Tyrolean Folk Art Museum in Innsbruck and the Bavarian National Museum in Munich.
