= Puez-Geisler Nature Park =

Nature park in the Dolomites in South Tyrol, Italy

Naturpark Puez-Geisler
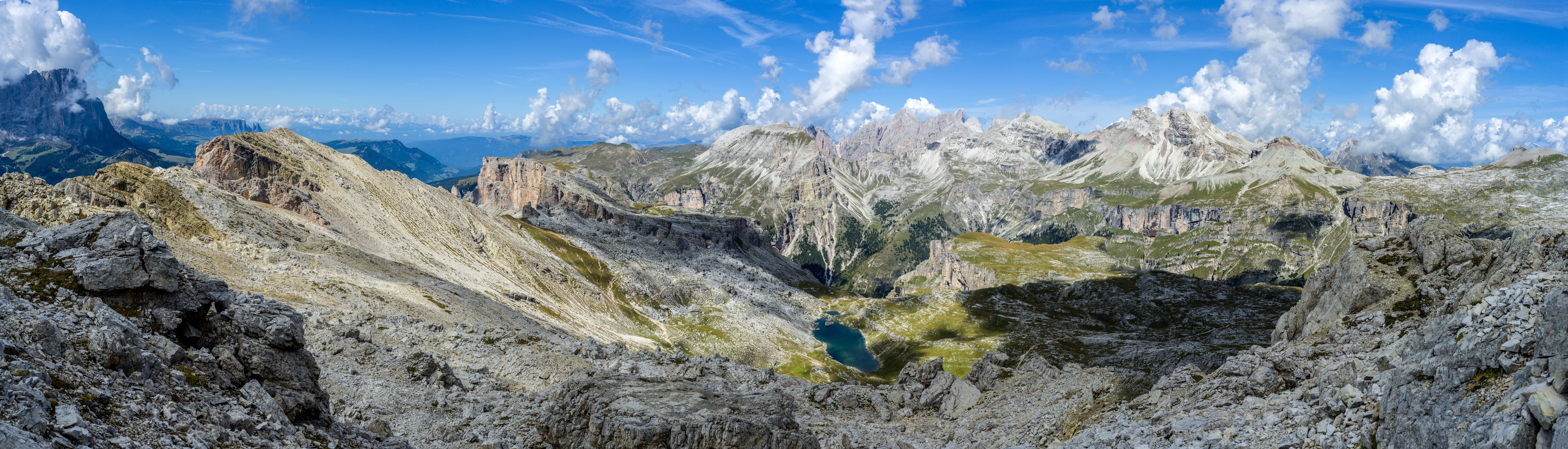
- Interactive map of Naturpark Puez-Geisler
- Location: South Tyrol, Italy
- Coordinates: 46°40′36″N 11°51′15″E
- Area: 10,196 ha (25,195 acres)
- Established: 1977
- Website: www.provinz.bz.it/natur/2803/index_e.asp

The Puez-Geisler Nature Park (Italian: Parco naturale Puez Odle; German: Naturpark Puez-Geisler) is a nature reserve in the Dolomites in South Tyrol, Italy.

== Gallery ==
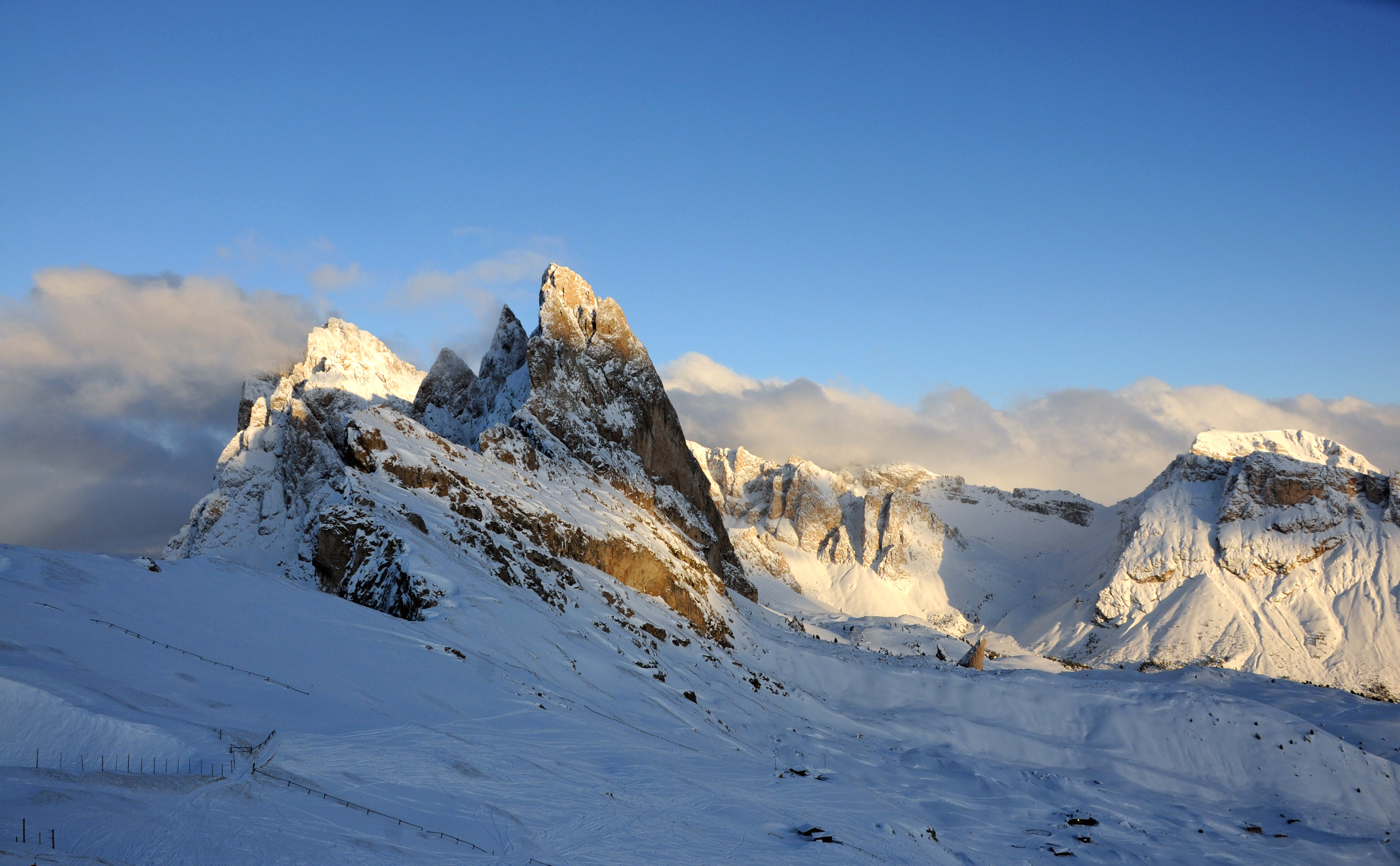
Western aspect of the mountain range featuring Grande Fermeda

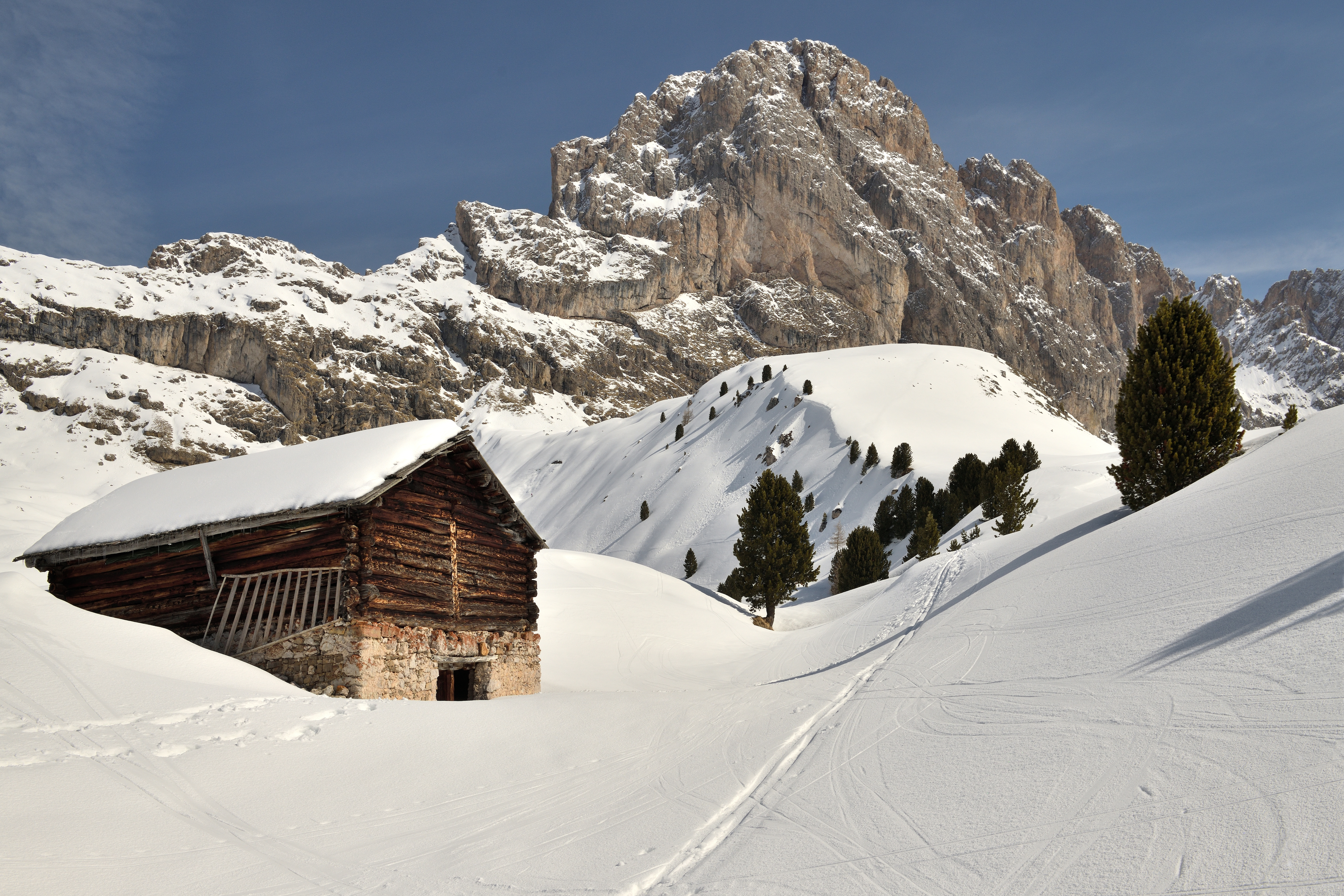
Barn on Mastlé mountain

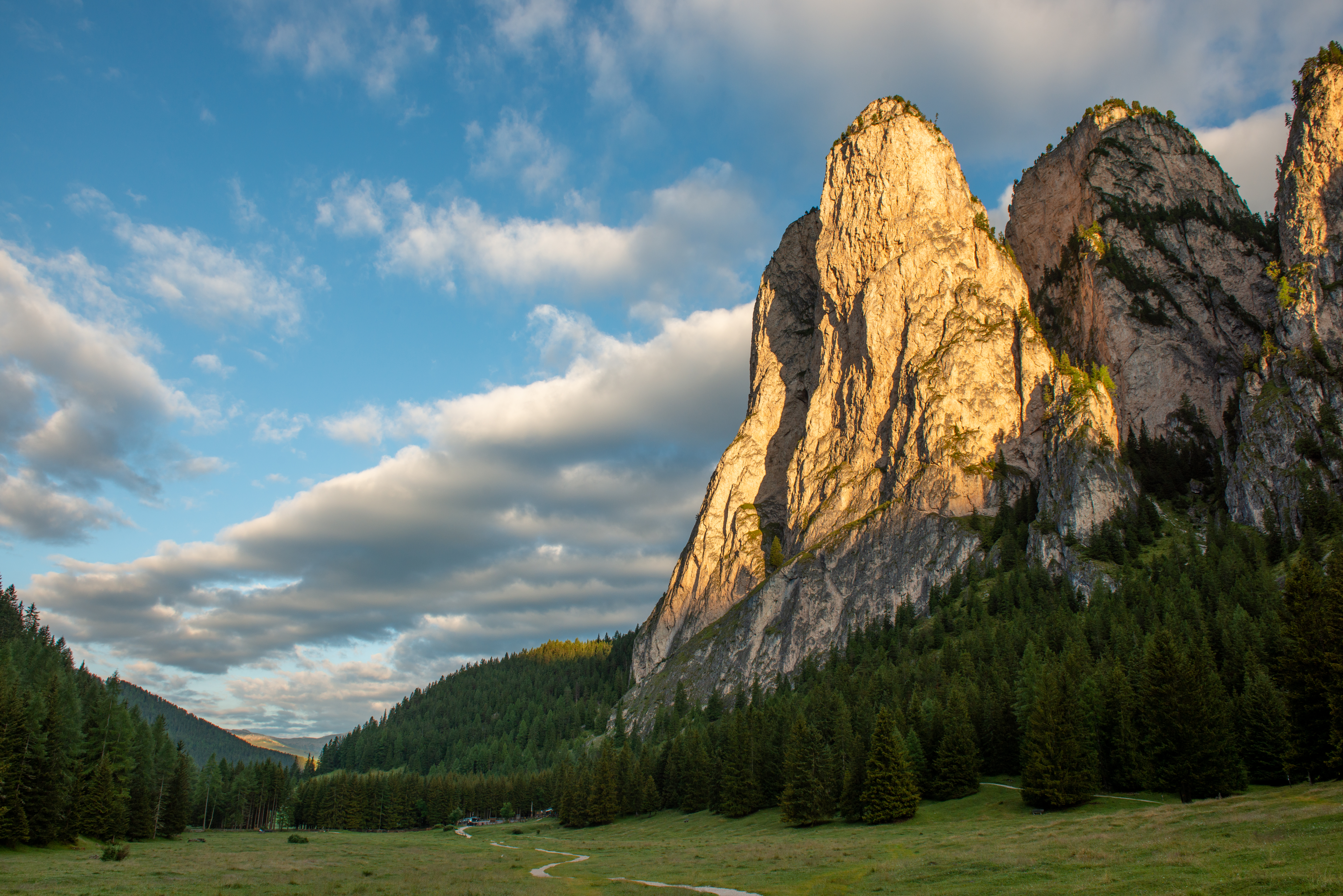
Steviola Tower of the Odles Group

Col de la Pieres in the Stevia group seen from Val Lietres in Val Gardena. Piz de Puez in upper right.
