= Santa Cristina Gherdëina =

- Comune
- Chemun de Santa Cristina Gherdëina; Comune di Santa Cristina Valgardena; Gemeinde St. Christina in Gröden
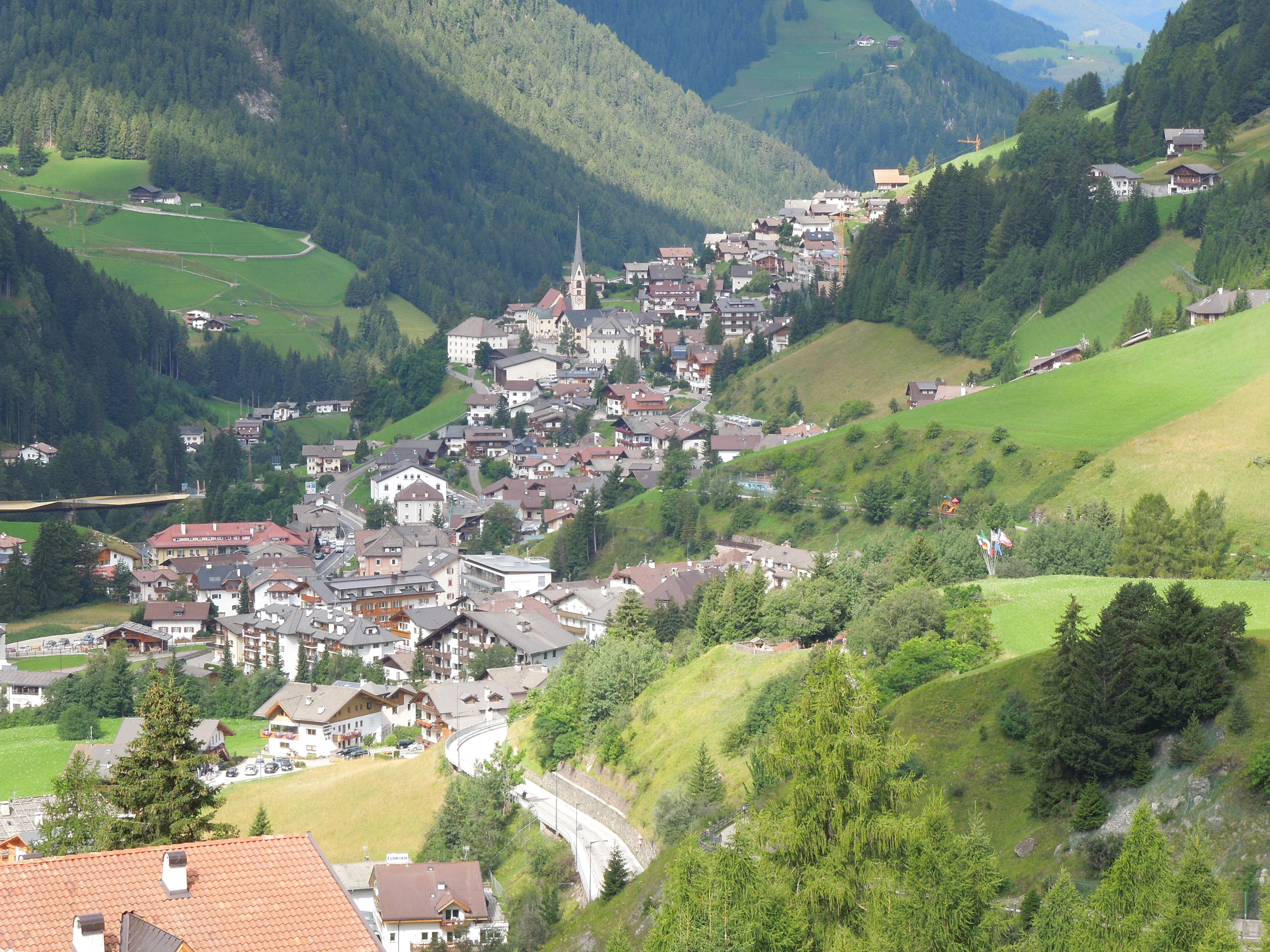
- View of Santa Cristina Gherdëina

- Location within Italy Location within Trentino-Alto Adige/Südtirol
- Coordinates: 46°34′N 11°43′E
- Country: Italy
- Region: Trentino-Alto Adige/Südtirol
- Province: South Tyrol (BZ)

Government
  - Mayor: Christoph Senoner (SVP)

Area
  - Total: 31.8 km^{2} (12.3 sq mi)
- Elevation: 1,428 m (4,685 ft)

Population (31.12.2010)
  - Total: 1,900
  - Density: 60/km^{2} (150/sq mi)
- Demonym(s): Italian: gardenesi German: Grödner
- Time zone: UTC+1 (CET)
  - Summer (DST): UTC+2 (CEST)
- Postal code: 39047
- Dialing code: 0471
- Patron saint: Saint Christina
- Website: Official website

Santa Cristina Gherdëina (Ladin: [ˈsanta kʀ̩̊ʃˈtina ɡʀ̩ˈdɜi̯na]; Italian: Santa Cristina Valgardena [ˈsanta kriˈstiːna ˌvalɡarˈdeːna, - ˌvalɡarˈdɛːna]; German: St. Christina in Gröden [saŋkt krɪsˈtiˑna ɪn ˈɡrøːdn̩]) is a Ladin comune (municipality) and a village in Val Gardena in the South Tyrol of northern Italy. It is located about 30 kilometres (19 mi) east of Bolzano. Its Saslong ski run is home of the Super-G and Downhill for men races in FIS Alpine Ski World Cup.

== Geography ==
As of 31 December 2010, it had a population of 1,900 and an area of 31.82 square kilometres (12.29 mi^{2}).

The municipality of Santa Cristina borders the following municipalities: Campitello di Fassa, Kastelruth, Villnöß, Urtijëi, San Martin de Tor and Sëlva.

== History ==
=== Coat of arms ===
The escutcheon is argent and gules party per fess: the upper part is represented a deer. It is the family Coat of Arms of Primus von Dosses, which has since 1636, near the church of St. Cristina, organized a refectory for the poor. The emblem was adopted in 1969.

== Society ==
=== Linguistic distribution ===
According to the 2024 census, 87.79% of the population speak Ladin, 6.85% Italian and 5.36% German as first language.

=== Demographic evolution ===
Historical population

Year	Pop.	±%
1861	?	—
1871	?	—
1881	?	—
1901	?	—
1911	?	—

Year	Pop.	±%
1921	913	—
1931	986	+8.0%
1936	1,043	+5.8%
1951	1,212	+16.2%
1961	1,306	+7.8%

Year	Pop.	±%
1971	1,494	+14.4%
1981	1,567	+4.9%
1991	1,598	+2.0%
2001	1,738	+8.8%
2001	1,905	+9.6%

Source: Data from ISTAT

=== Culture and traditions ===
Santa Cristina cultural and community life include a town band, active since 1856, and a choir that has been performing since 1972. Various musical associations contribute to the preservation of folk music, playing a role in the cultural landscape of Santa Cristina. They organize many festivals throughout the year, bringing together locals and visitors for celebrations.

== Notable people ==
- Samuel Barber (1910-1981) an American composer who had a chalet in Santa Cristina Gherdëina
- Vincenzo Demetz (1911-1990) an Italian cross-country skier who competed in the 1936 Winter Olympics
- Inge Senoner (born 1940) an Italian alpine skier, competed in two events at the 1964 Winter Olympics
- Giustina Demetz (born 1941) an Italian former alpine skier, competed at the 1964 and 1968 Winter Olympics
- Giuseppe Ploner (born 1959) former Italian cross-country skier
- Michela Ponza (born 1979) retired Italian professional biathlete, lives in Santa Cristina Gherdëina
- Simona Senoner (June 13, 1993 – January 7, 2011) an Italian cross-country racer and ski jumper, lived in Santa Cristina Gherdëina

== See also ==
- Lech Sant
