= Derjon =

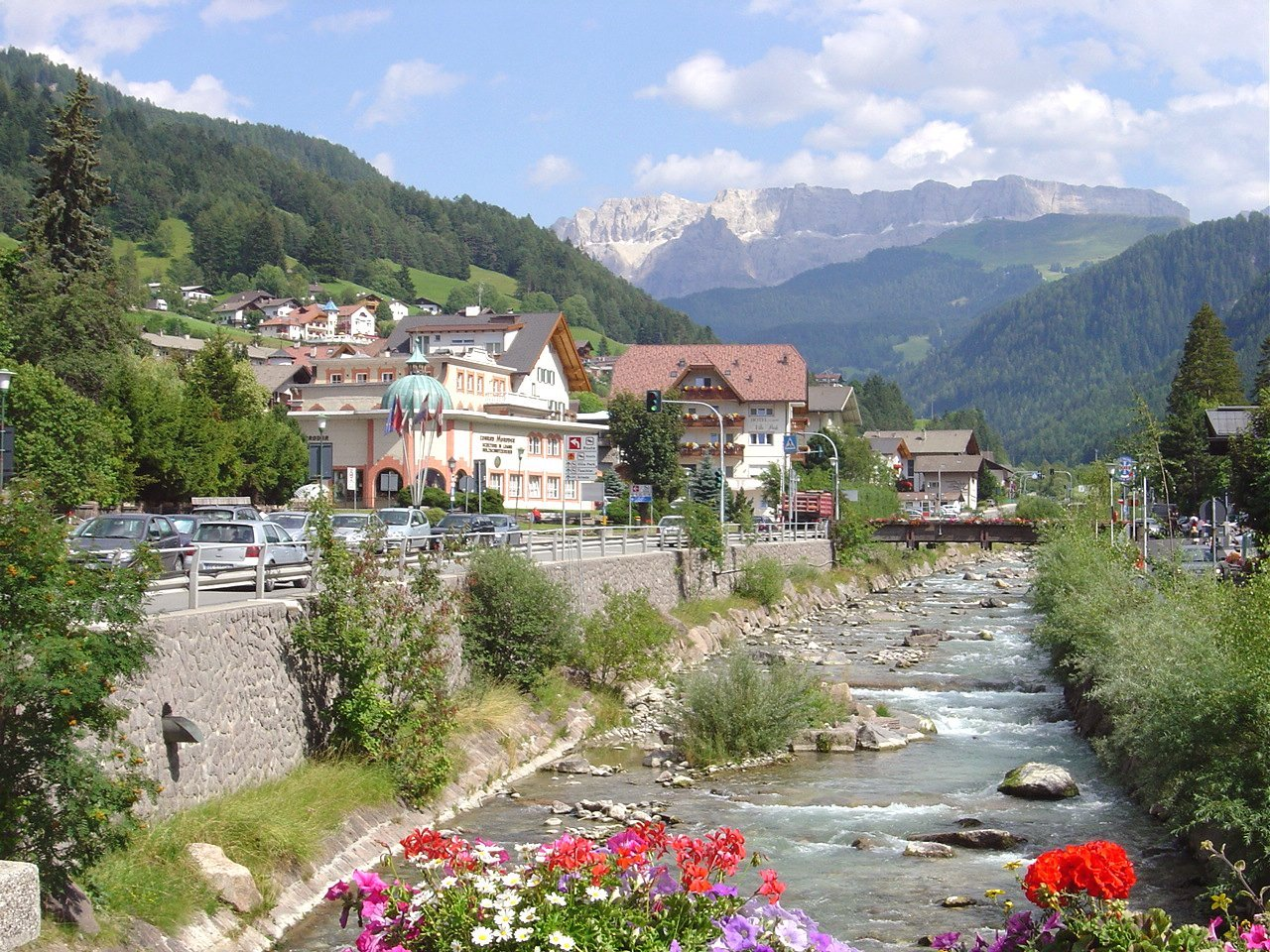

Location
- Country: Italy

Physical characteristics
- Source
  - location: Sellajoch, South Tyrol, Italy
  - coordinates: 46°31′4″N 11°45′20″E
  - elevation: 1,470 m (4,820 ft)
- Mouth: Eisack
  - location: Waidbruck, South Tyrol, Italy
  - coordinates: 46°35′58″N 11°31′52″E
- Length: 25.8 km (16.0 mi)
- Basin size: 199 km^{2} (77 sq mi)

Basin features
- Progression: Eisack→ Adige→ Adriatic Sea

The Derjon (Ladin: Derjon; Italian: Rio Gardena; German: Grödner Bach) is a stream in South Tyrol, Italy.
