= Monte Seceda =

Mountain in Italy

- Secёda
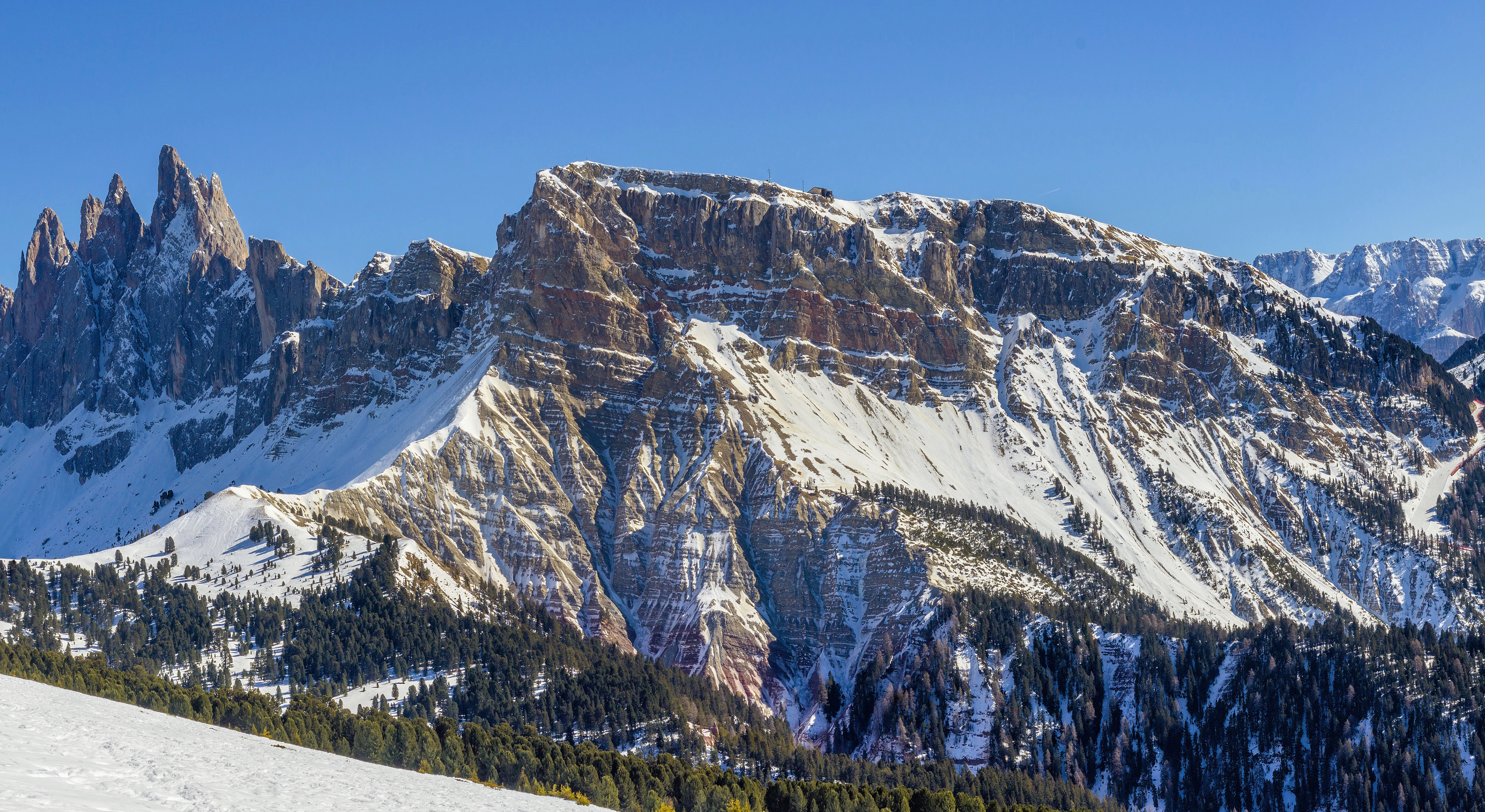
- West aspect

Highest point
- Elevation: 2,519 m (8,264 ft)
- Prominence: 82 m (269 ft)
- Parent peak: Furchëta
- Isolation: 1.3 km (0.81 mi)
- Coordinates: 46°36′02″N 11°43′34″E

Geography
- Location within Italy Location within Alps
- Interactive map of Seceda
- Country: Italy
- Province: South Tyrol
- Protected area: Puez-Geisler Nature Park
- Parent range: Dolomites; Odles Group
- Topo map: Tabacco 30 Bressanone - Val di Funes

Geology
- Rock age: Triassic
- Rock type: Dolomite

Monte Seceda, or Secёda, is a mountain in the province of South Tyrol in northern Italy.

== Description ==
Monte Seceda is a 2,519-meter-elevation (8,264-foot) summit in the Odles Group of the Dolomites, a UNESCO World Heritage Site. Set in the Trentino-Alto Adige/Südtirol region, the peak is located four kilometers (2.5 miles) north of the village of Santa Cristina Gherdëina, and the peak is in Puez-Geisler Nature Park. Precipitation runoff from the mountain's northeast slope drains into Rio Funes, whereas the other slopes drain into tributaries of the Derjon. Topographic relief is significant as the summit rises 1,200 meters (3,937 feet) above Val Gardena in four kilometers (2.5 miles). The nearest higher neighbor is Untere Fermeda, 1.32 kilometers (0.82 mile) to the east. A gondola lifts tourists from the town of Urtijëi up to the slopes of Seceda where trails await to enjoy spectacular scenery such as views of Grande Fermeda, and providing one of the most dramatic experiences in the Dolomites.

== Climate ==
Based on the Köppen climate classification, Monte Seceda is located in an alpine climate zone with long, cold winters, and short, mild summers. Weather systems are forced upwards by the mountains (orographic lift), causing moisture to drop in the form of rain and snow. The months of June through September offer the most favorable weather for visiting or climbing in this area.

== Gallery ==
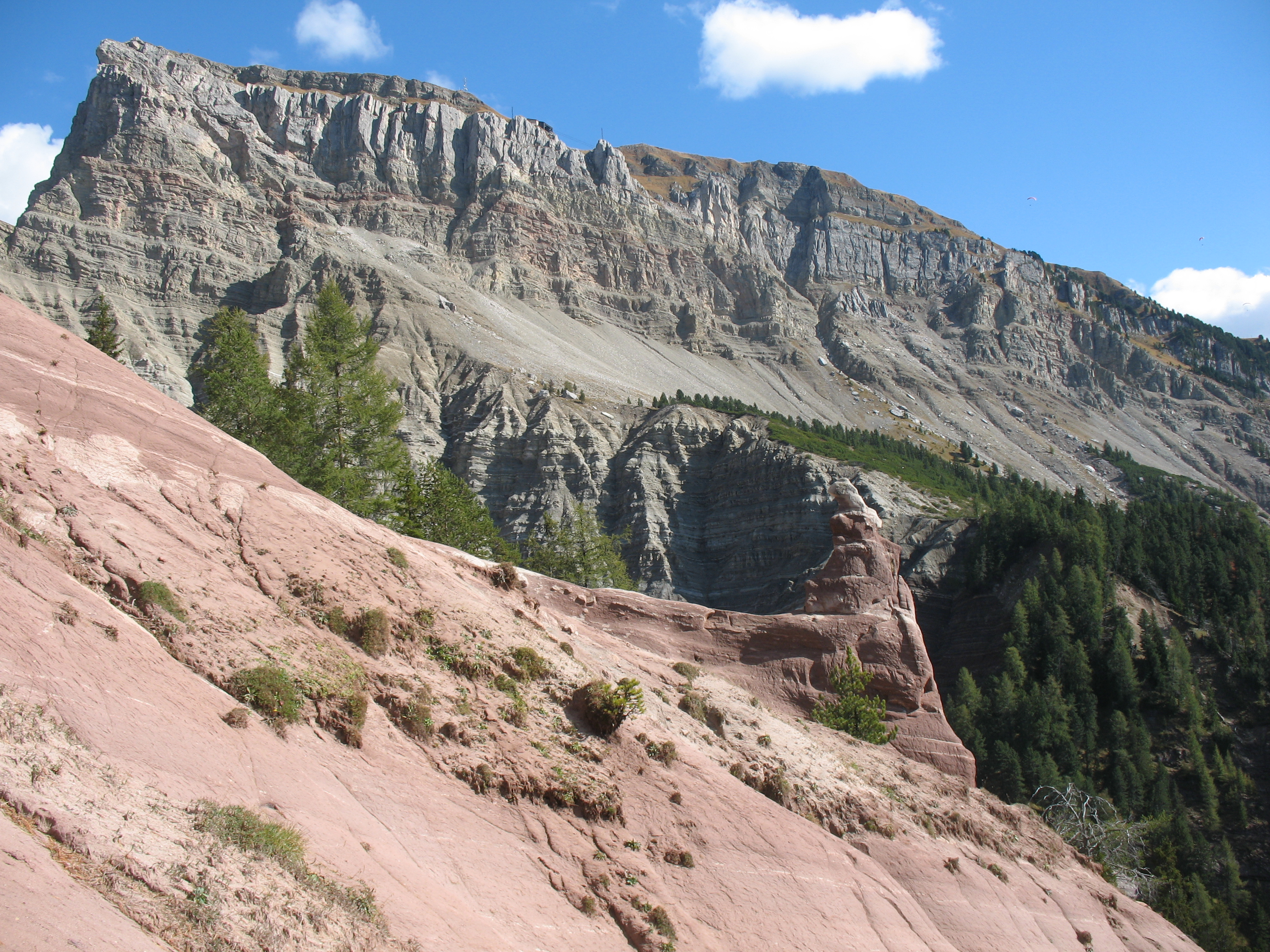
West aspect

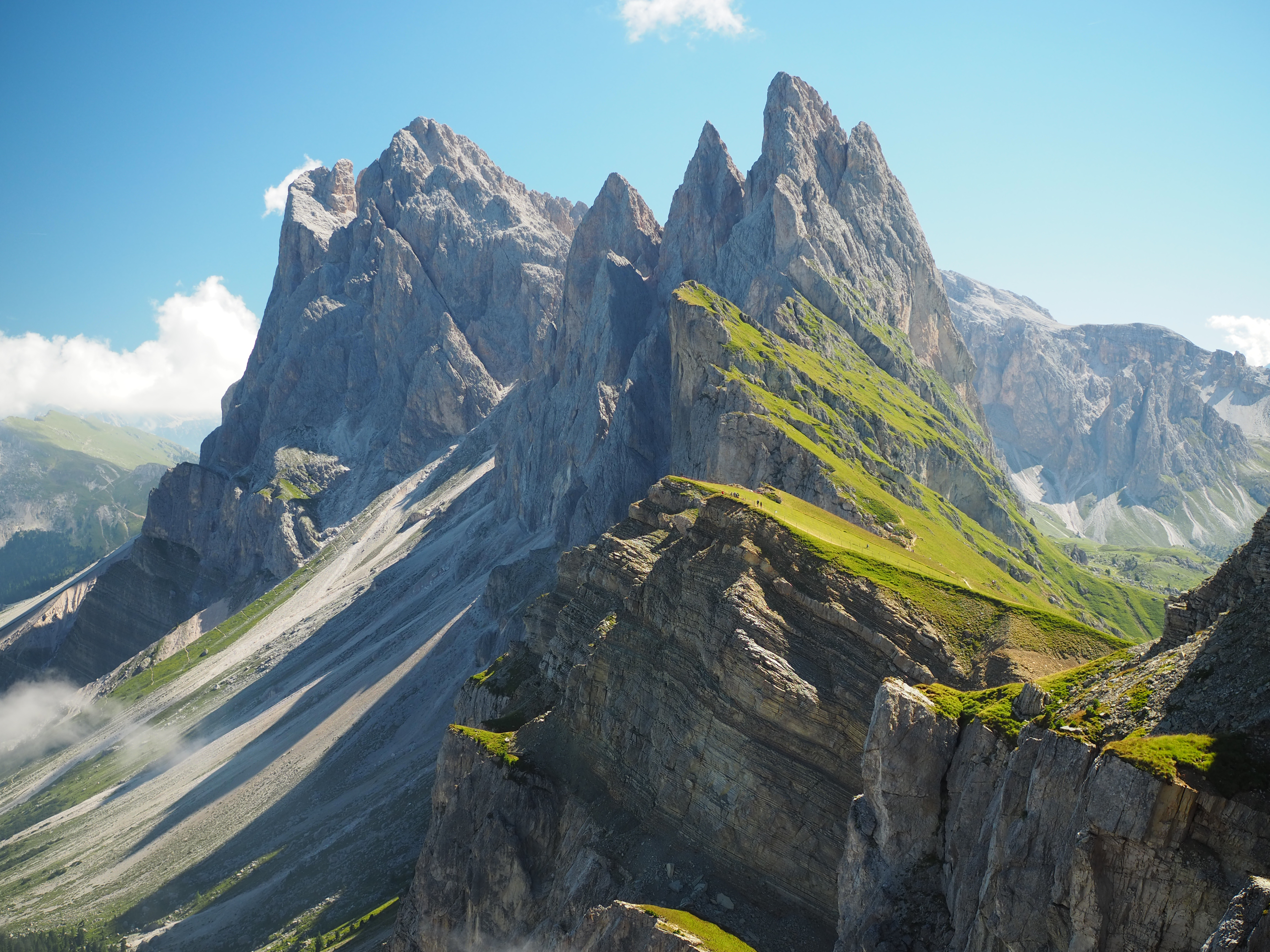
View of Grande Fermeda from Seceda

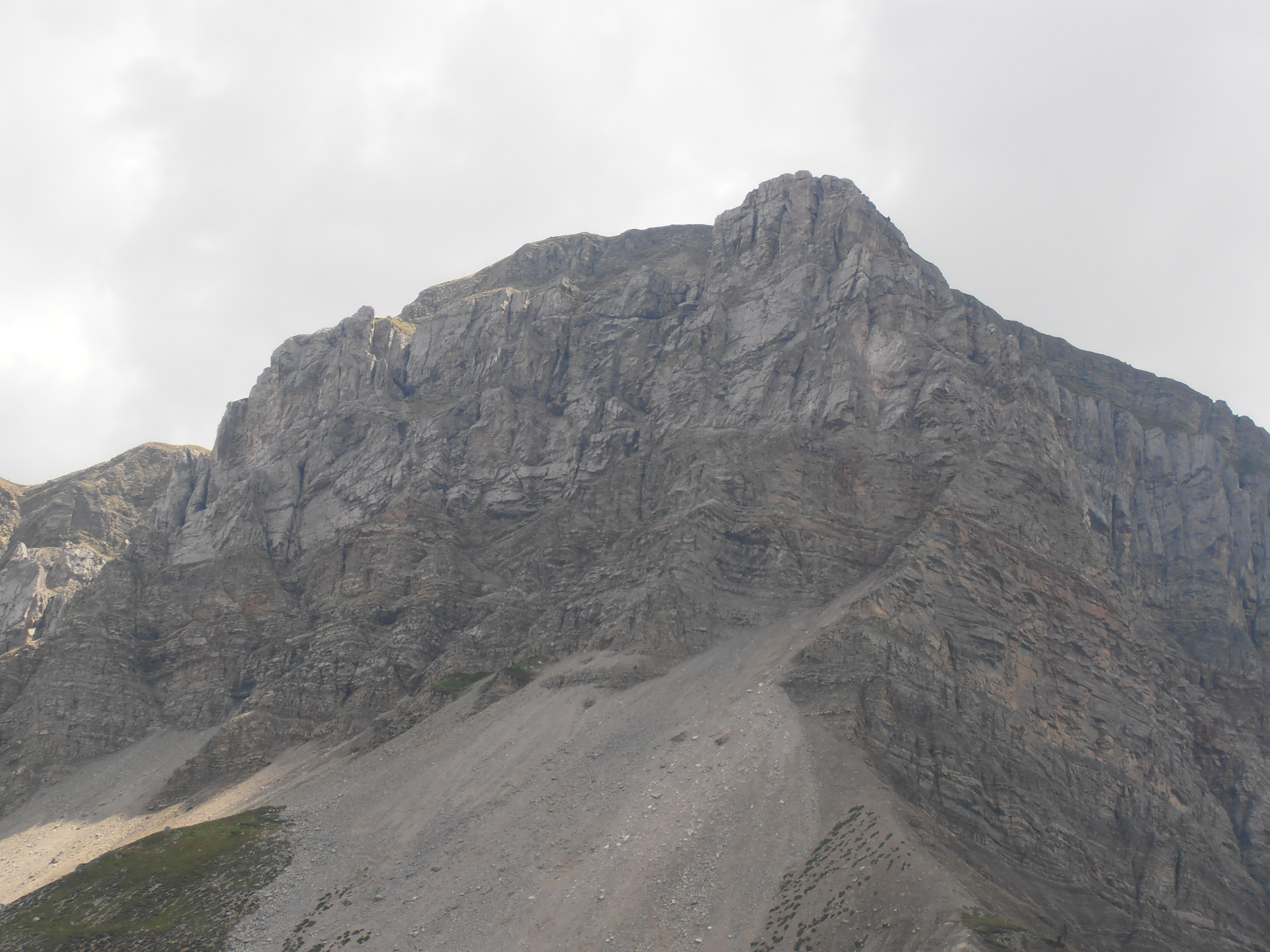
Northwest aspect

Seceda furthest to right

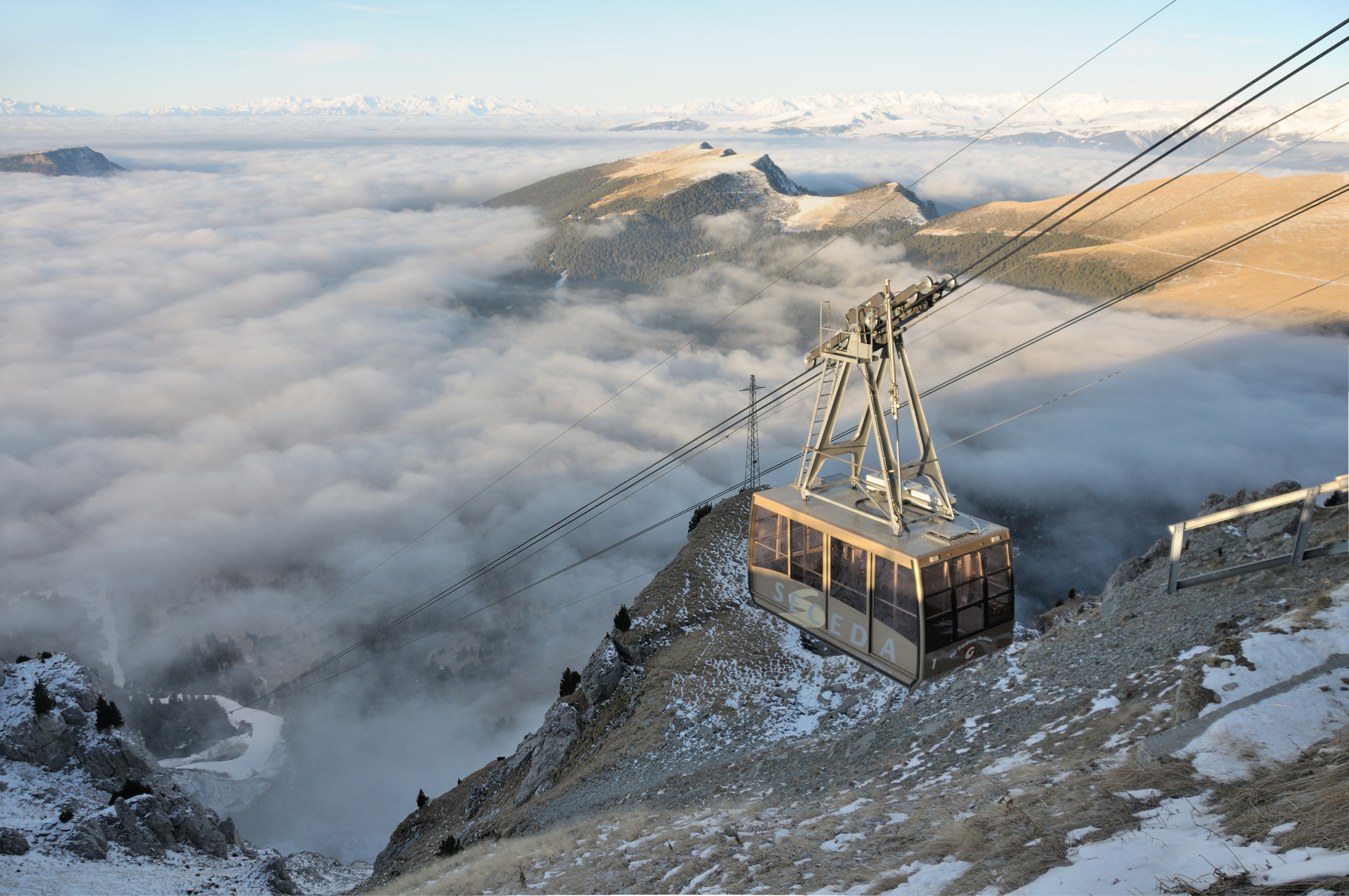
Cable car to Seceda

== See also ==
- Southern Limestone Alps
