= Odles Group =

Mountain range in the Dolomites of Italy

The Odles Group (Geislergruppe or Geislerspitzen in German) is a mountain range in the Dolomites that, together with the Puez Group, constitutes the majority of the territory of the Puez-Odles Nature Park, bordered by the Val Badia, Val Gardena, and Val di Funes, in South Tyrol.

== Geography ==
The highest peaks in the chain are Sas Rigais and Furchëta, both at 3,025 meters.

At the base of the Funes Odles, one can follow the so-called "Odles Trail" (in German Adolf Munkel-Weg), which passes at the northern base of the Odles Group, where there is also a rock climbing gym.

== Toponym ==
The name is attested in 1759 as Gaislerspitz and in 1770 as Geisler Spiz. The term Odles translates from the Ladin language simply as "needles" referring to the pointed shape of many peaks in this group.

== Classification ==
According to the SOIUSA, the Odle are an Alpine group with the following classification:

- Major part = Eastern Alps
- Major sector = South-Eastern Alps
- Section = Dolomites
- Subsection = Gardena and Fassa Dolomites
- Supergroup = Gardena Dolomites
- Group = Odle Group i.s.a.
- Code = II/C-31.III-A.5

== Subdivision ==
The SOIUSA divides the Odle Group into two subgroups:

- Odles Group proper (a)
- Raschiesa Subgroup (b)

== Main Peaks ==
- Sass Rigais, 3,025 m
- Furchetta, 3,025 m
- Sass de Porta (Seekofel), 2,915 m
- Sass da l'Ega (Wasserkofel), 2,915 m
- Gran Fermeda (Fermeda), 2,873 m
- Gran Odla (Feislerspitz), 2,832 m
- Sass de Mesdì (Mittagsspitz), 2,760 m
- Monte Seceda (Secёda), 2,519 m
- Alpe Raschiesa di Fuori (Außerraschötzer Alm), 2,284 m

== Gallery ==
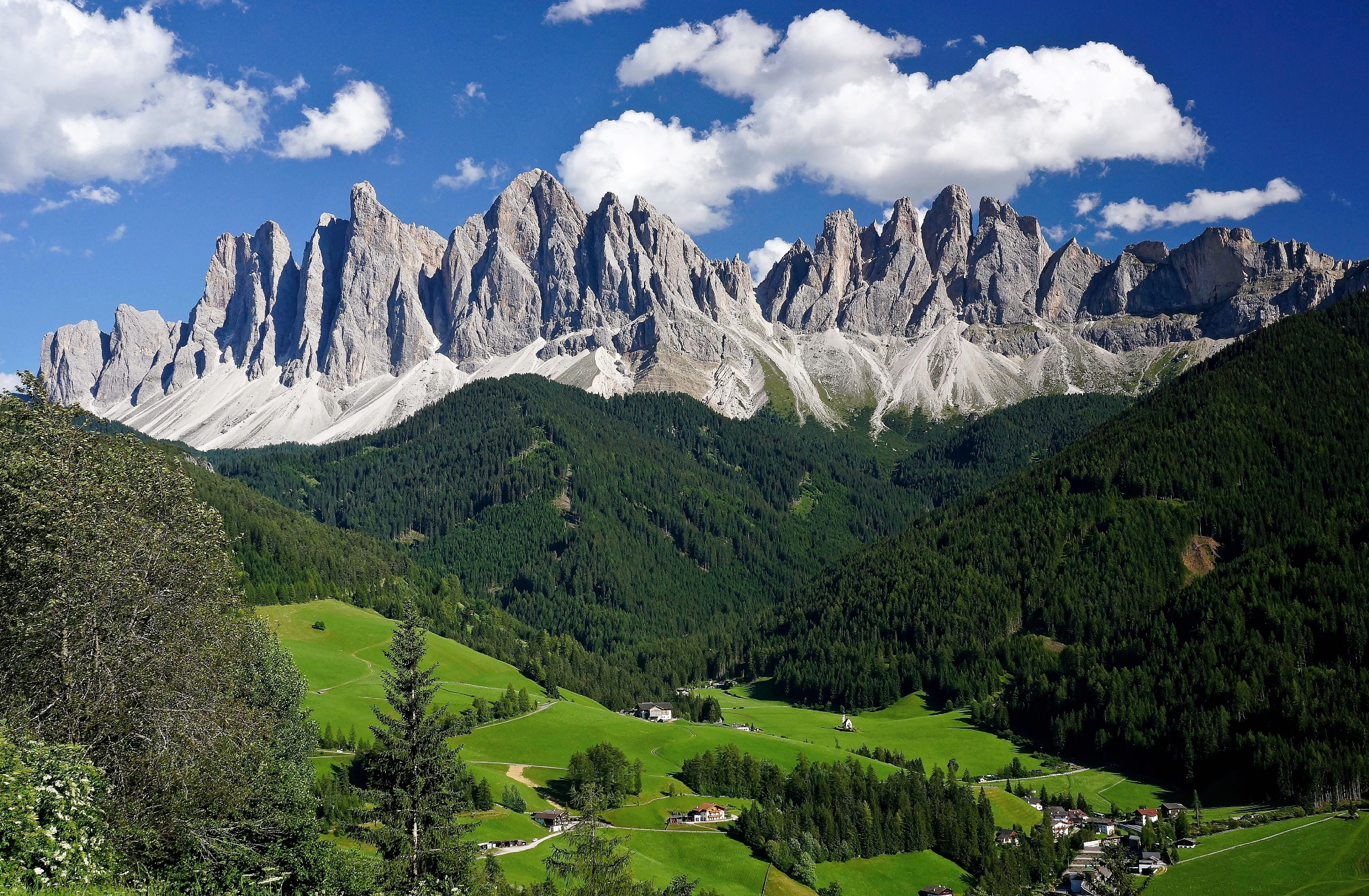
Odles Group seen from the north

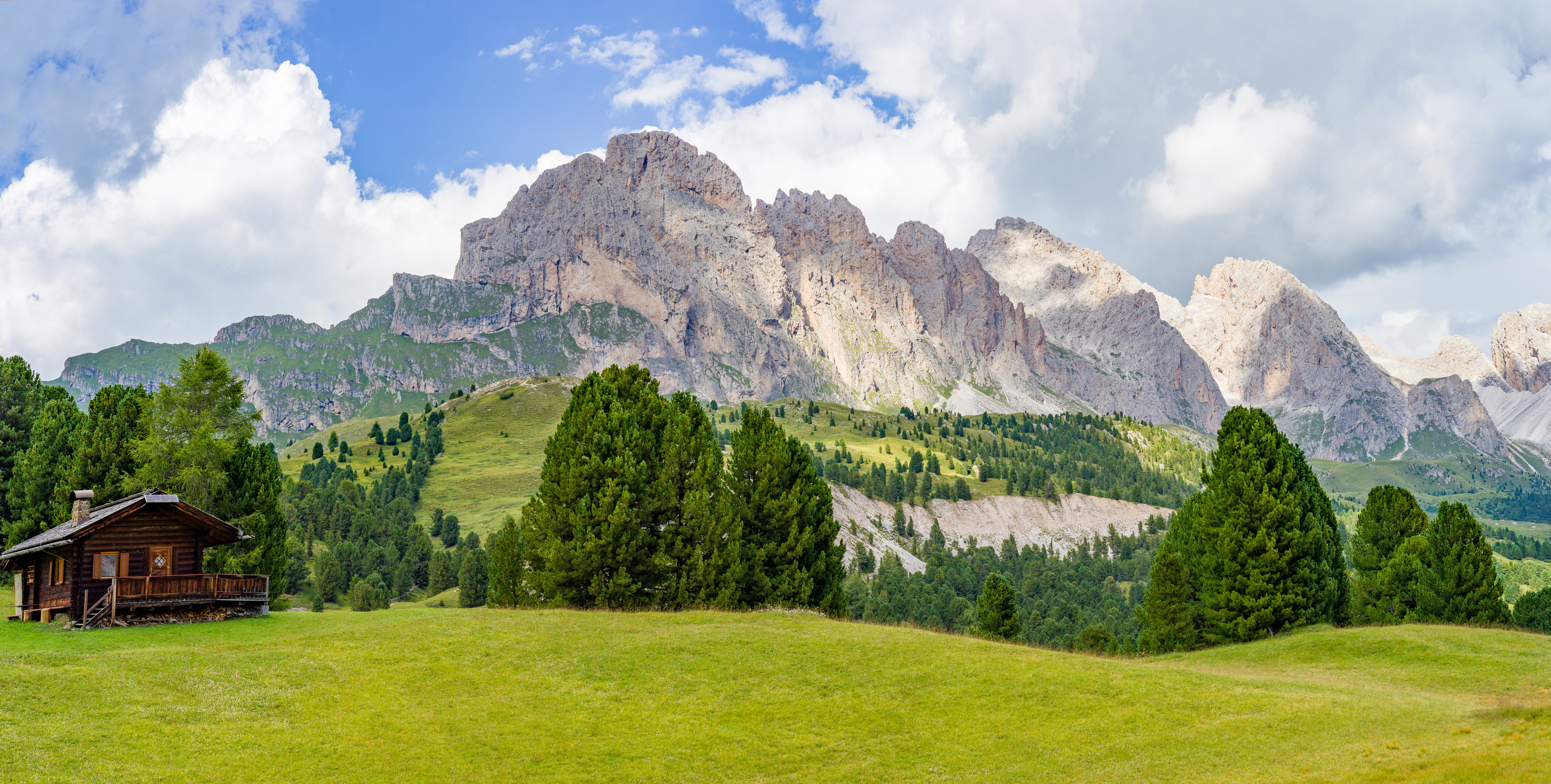
The Odles Group seen from the south.

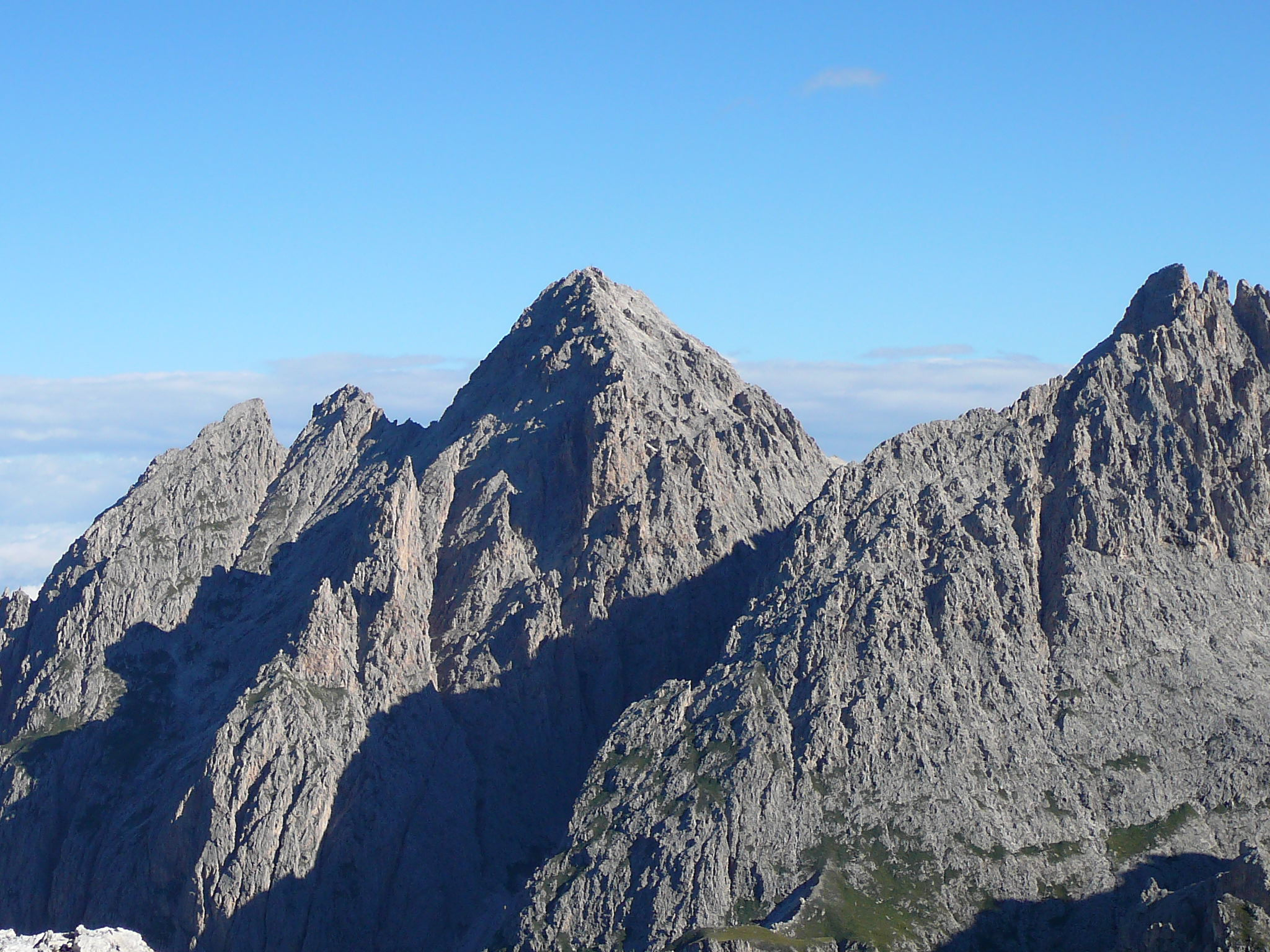
Sass Rigais

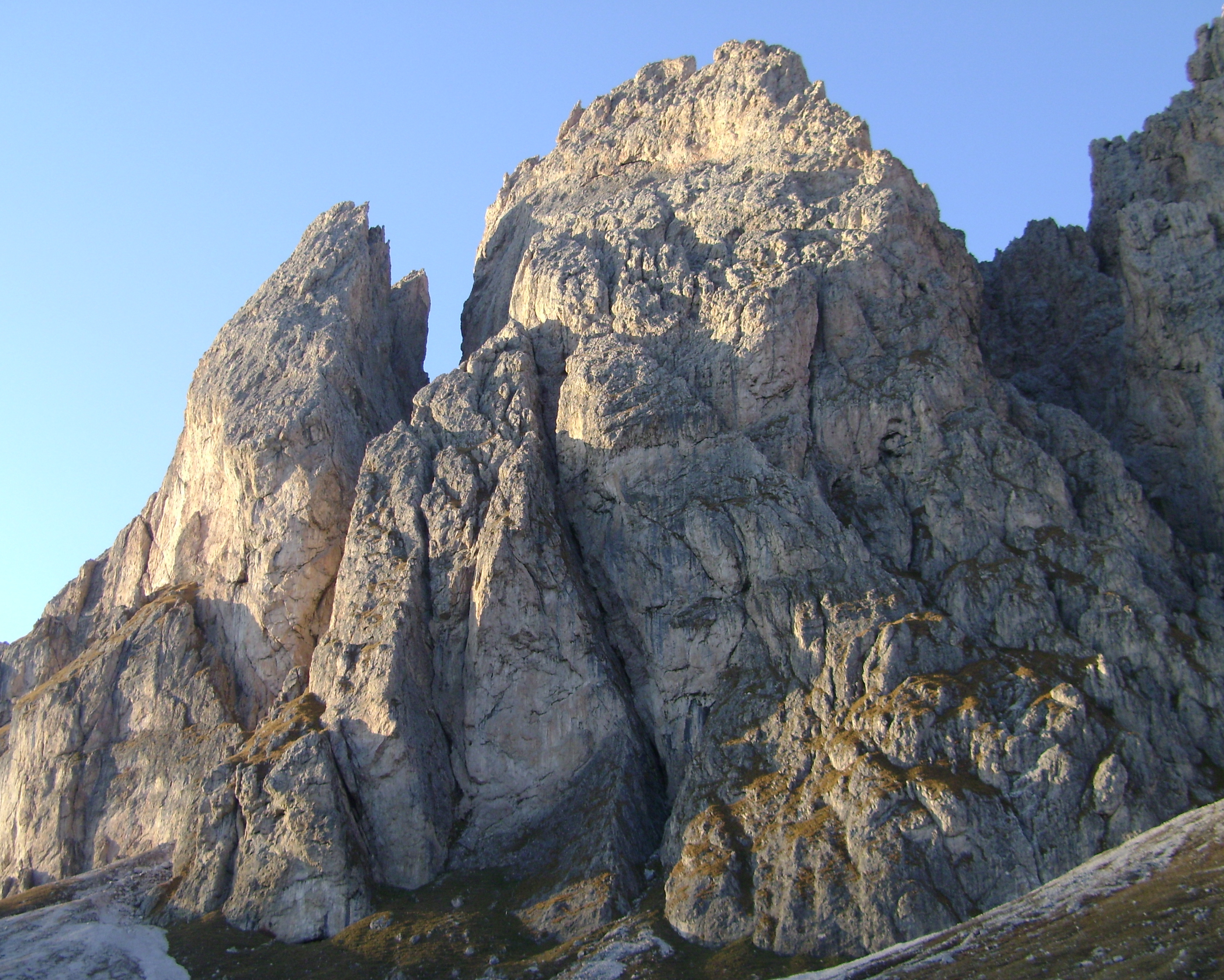
Gran Fermeda

== Bibliography ==
- Marazzi, Sergio (2005). Atlante Orografico delle Alpi. SOIUSA. Pavone Canavese: Priuli & Verlucca. ISBN 978-88-8068-273-8.
