= Grande Fermeda =

Mountain in Italy

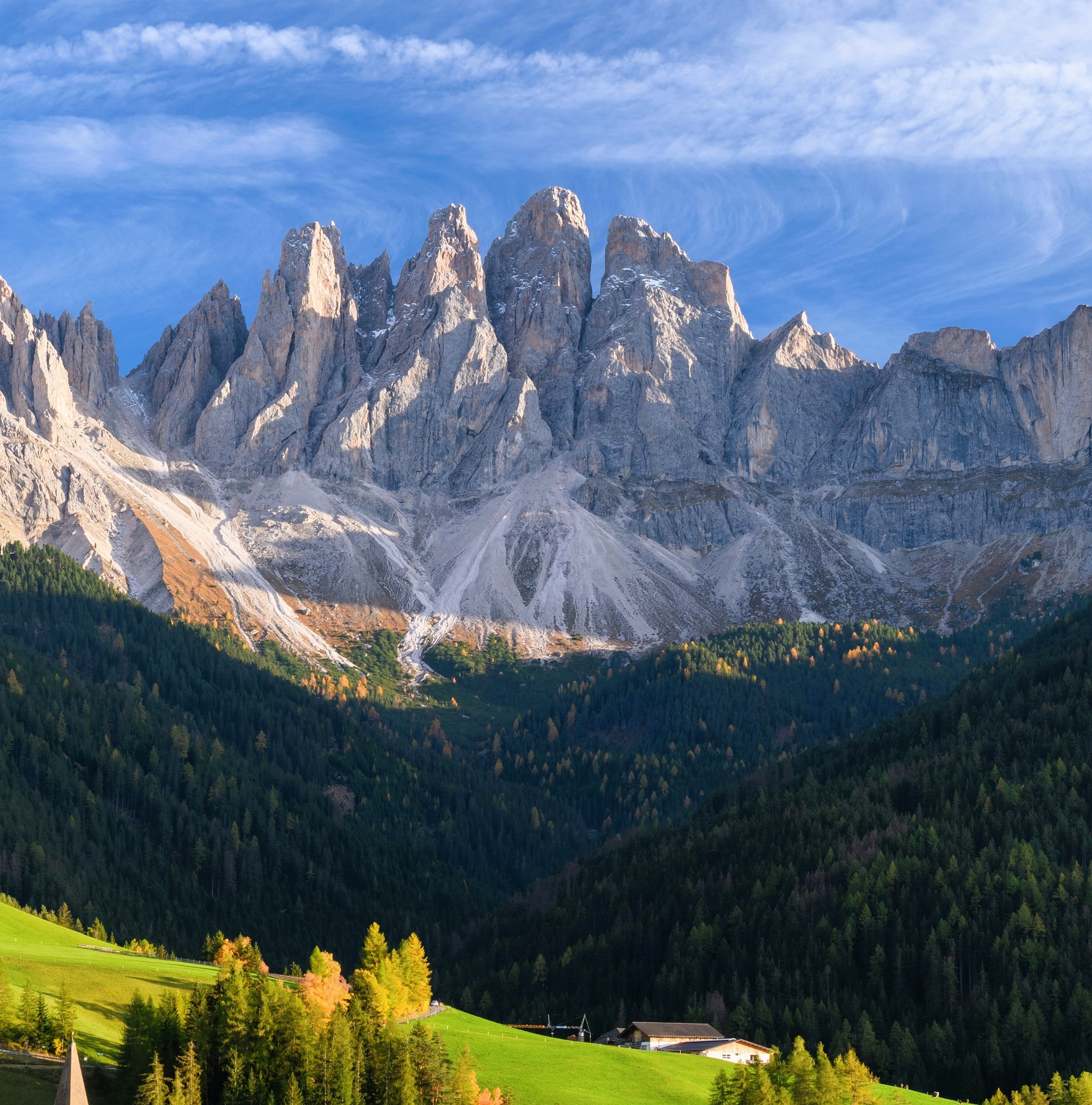
- North-northwest aspect

Highest point
- Elevation: 2,873 m (9,426 ft)
- Prominence: 274 m (899 ft)
- Parent peak: Furchëta
- Isolation: 1.124 km (0.698 mi)
- Coordinates: 46°36′09″N 11°45′06″E

Geography
- Location within Italy
- Country: Italy
- Province: South Tyrol
- Protected area: Puez-Geisler Nature Park
- Parent range: Dolomites; Odles Group
- Topo map: Tabacco Map 030 Bressanone - Val di Funes

Geology
- Rock age: Triassic
- Rock type: Dolomite

Climbing
- First ascent: 1887

Grande Fermeda, also known as Große Fermeda or Gran Fermeda, is a mountain in the province of South Tyrol in northern Italy.

== Description ==
Grande Fermeda is a 2,873-meter-elevation (9,426-foot) summit in the Odles Group of the Dolomites, a UNESCO World Heritage Site. Set in the Trentino-Alto Adige/Südtirol region, the peak is located four kilometers (2.5 miles) north of the village of Santa Cristina Gherdëina, and the peak is the 11th-highest in Puez-Geisler Nature Park. Precipitation runoff from the mountain's south slope drains into tributaries of the Derjon, whereas the north slope drains into Rio Funes. Topographic relief is significant as the summit rises 1,020 meters (3,346 feet) along the north slope in approximately one kilometer (0.6 mile), and 1,470 meters (4,822 feet) above Val Gardena in four kilometers (2.5 miles). The first known ascent of the summit was made in 1887 by Michele Bettega, Edward Theodore Compton, T. G. Martin, and Karl Schulz. The nearest higher neighbor is Sas Rigais, one kilometer (0.6 mile) to the northeast.

== Climate ==
Based on the Köppen climate classification, Grande Fermeda is located in an alpine climate zone with long, cold winters, and short, mild summers. Weather systems are forced upwards by the mountains (orographic lift), causing moisture to drop in the form of rain and snow. The months of June through September offer the most favorable weather for visiting or climbing in this area.

== Gallery ==
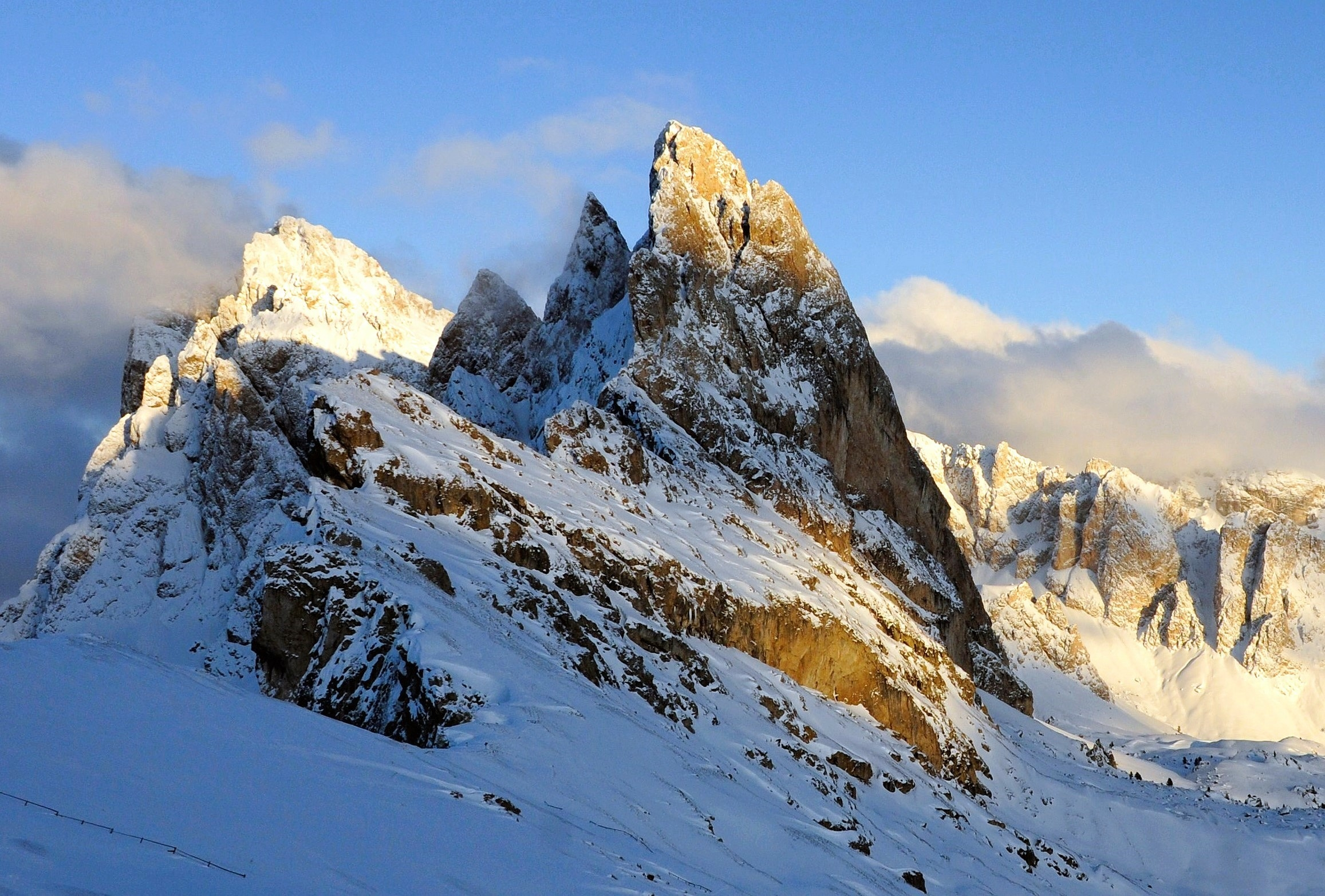
West aspect

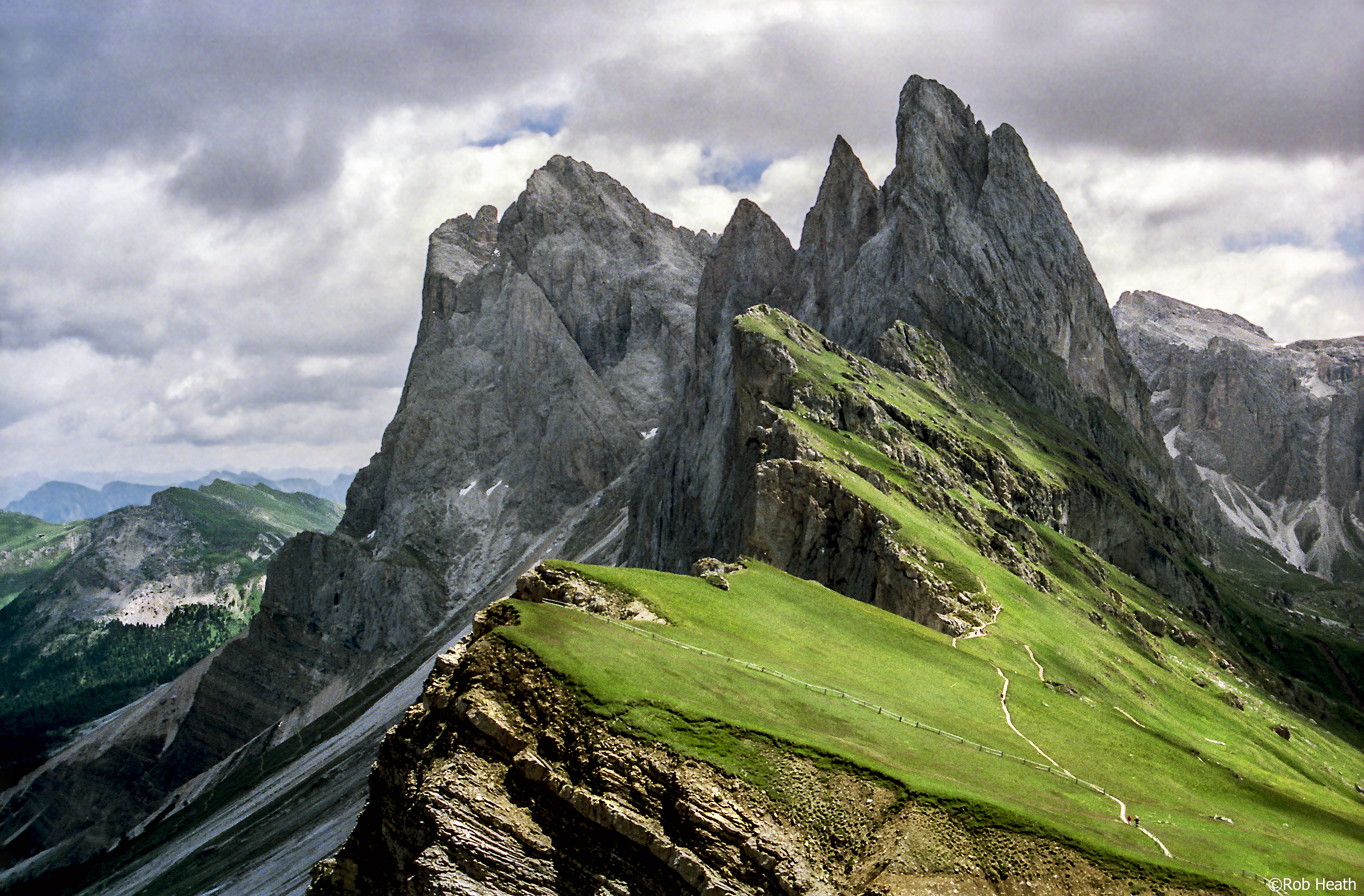
Grande Fermeda to right

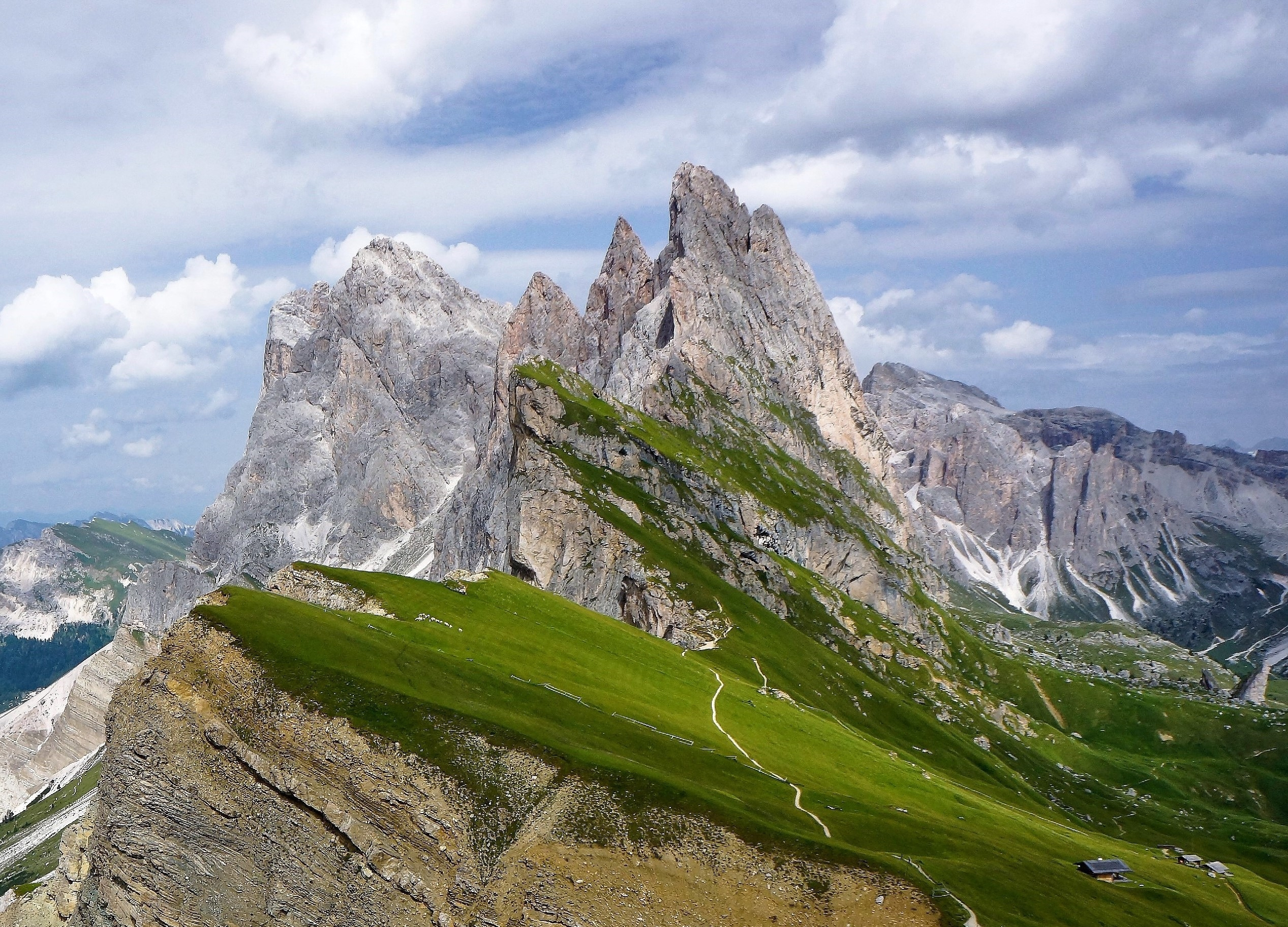
West aspect

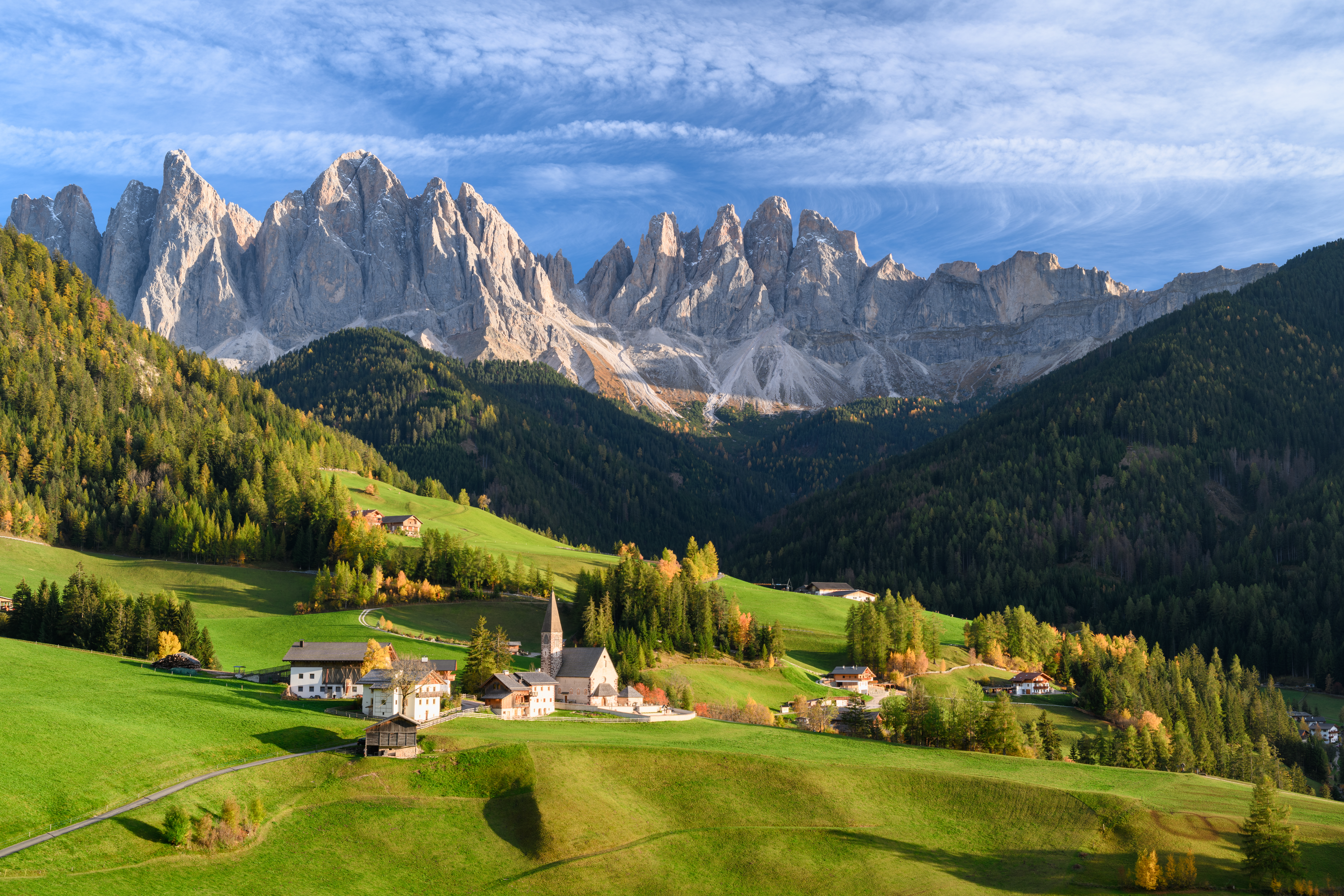
Grande Fermeda right of center on skyline

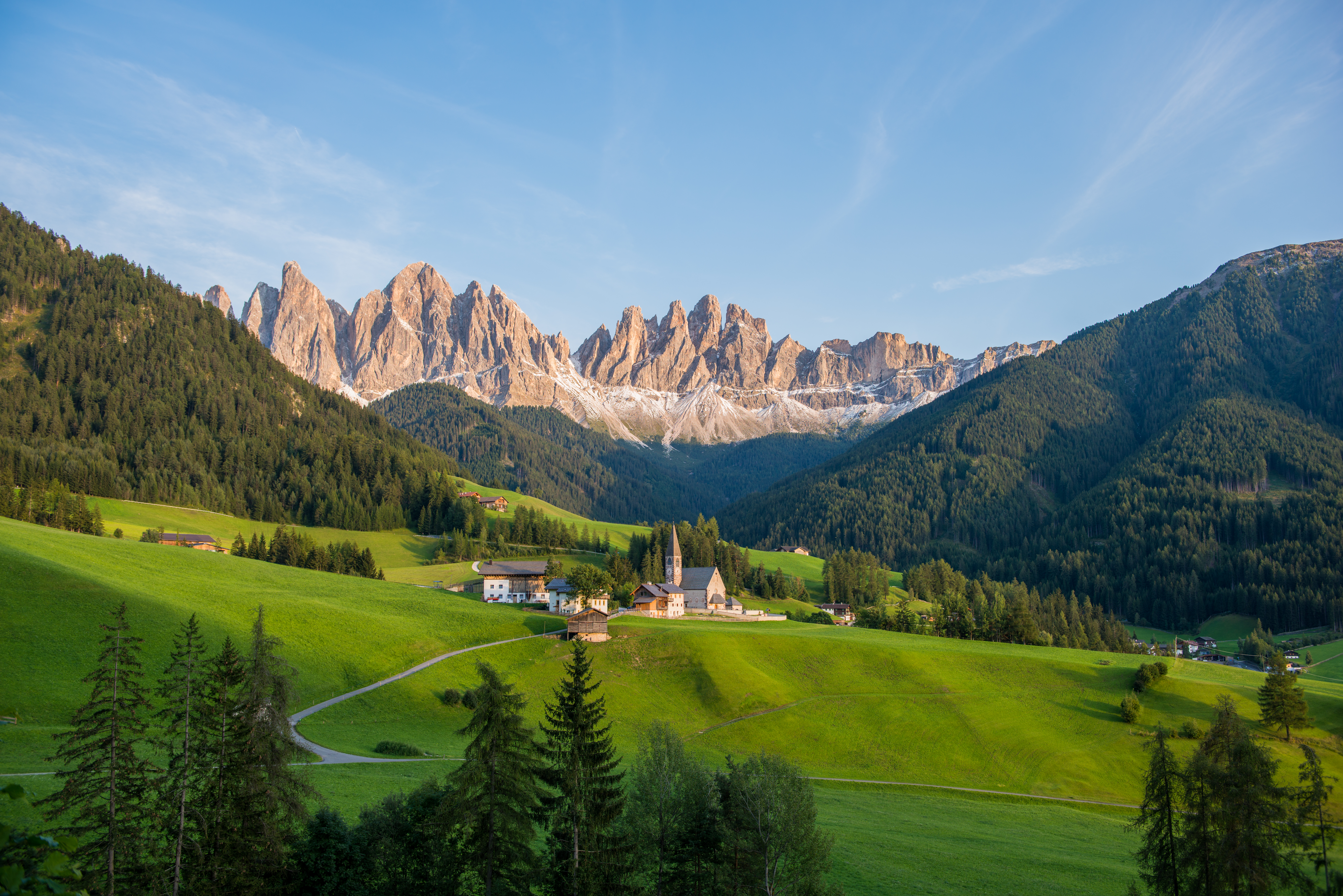
Grande Fermeda centered on skyline

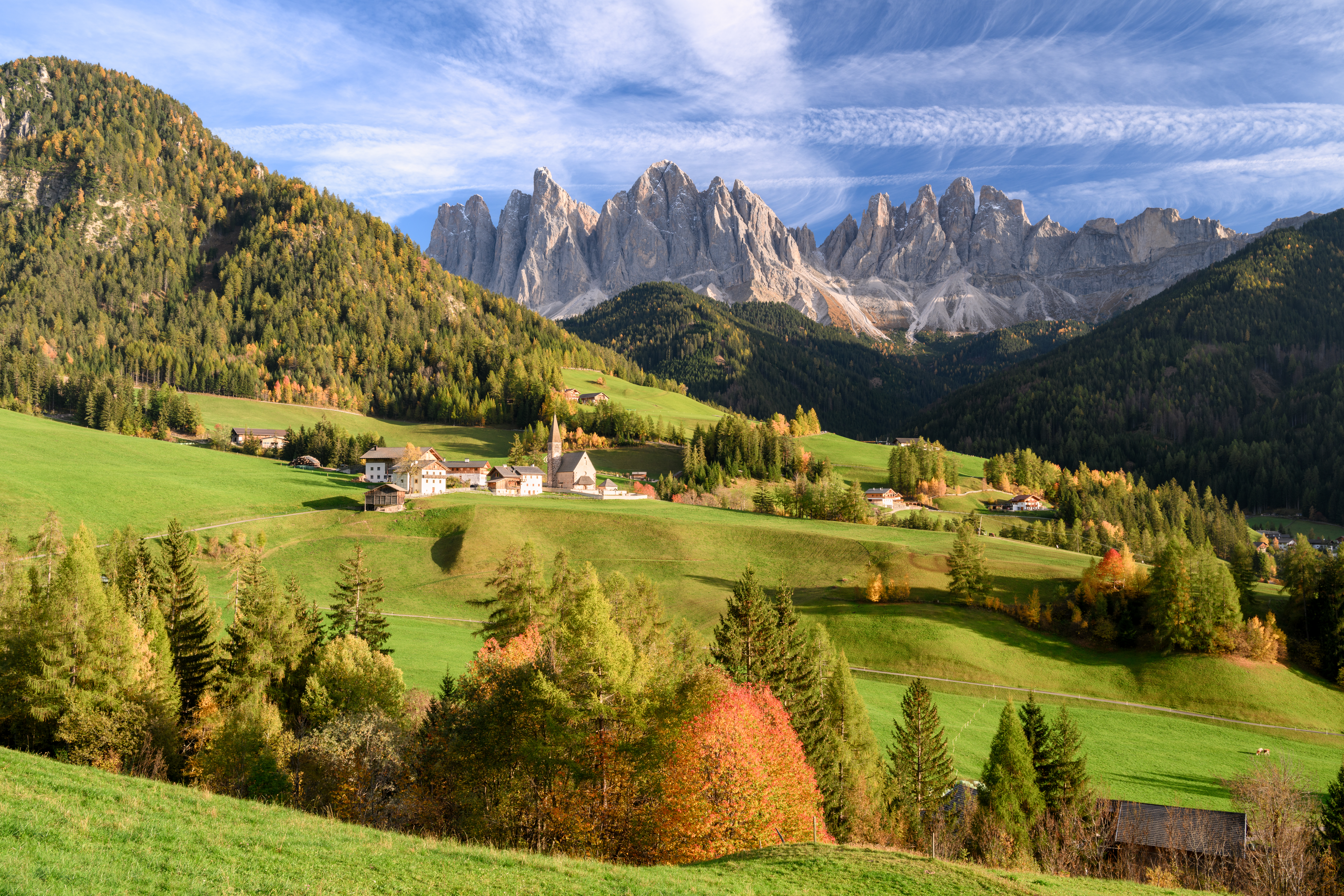
Sass Rigais centered on skyline with Grande Fermeda to right

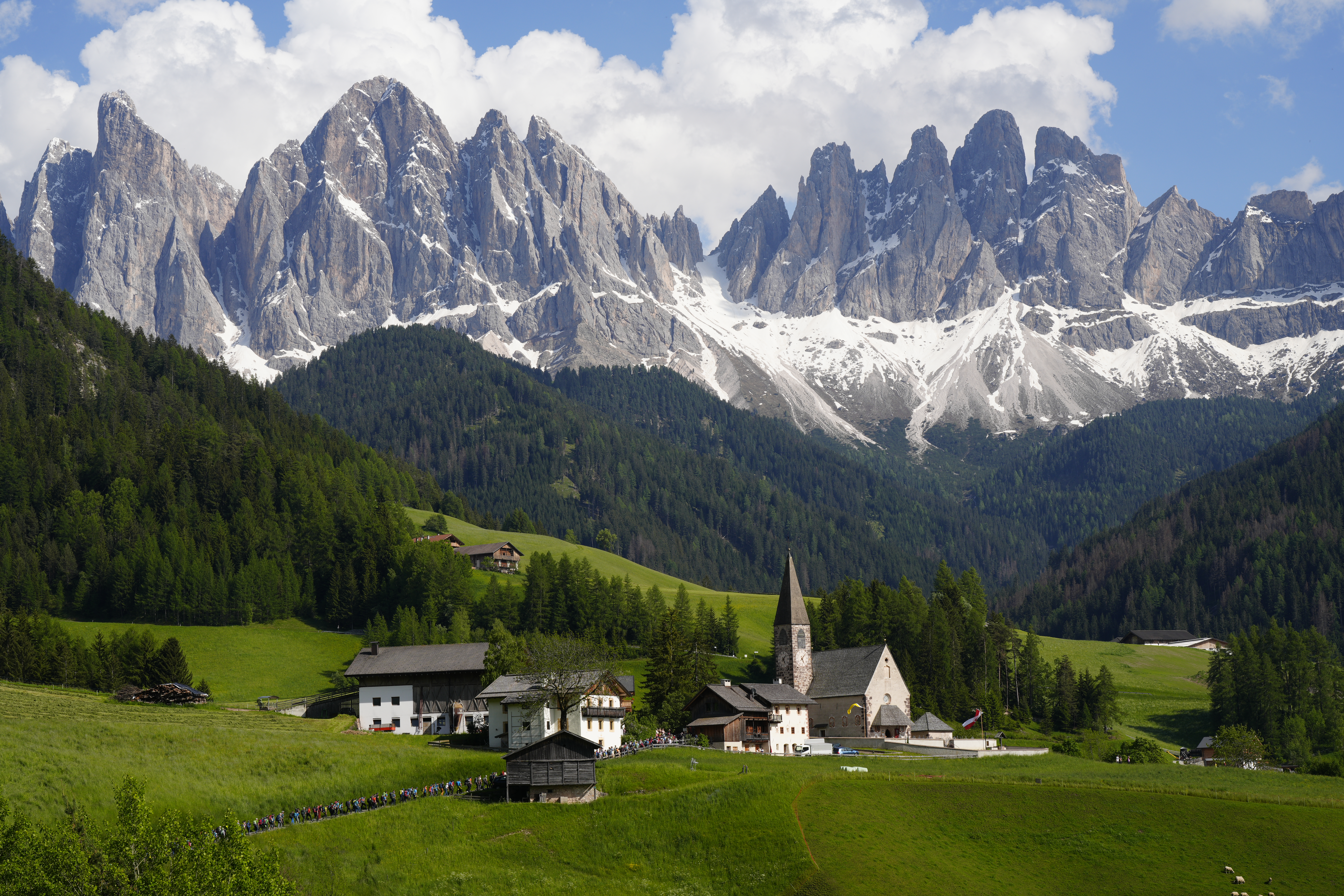
Sass Rigais (left) with Grande Fermeda (right)

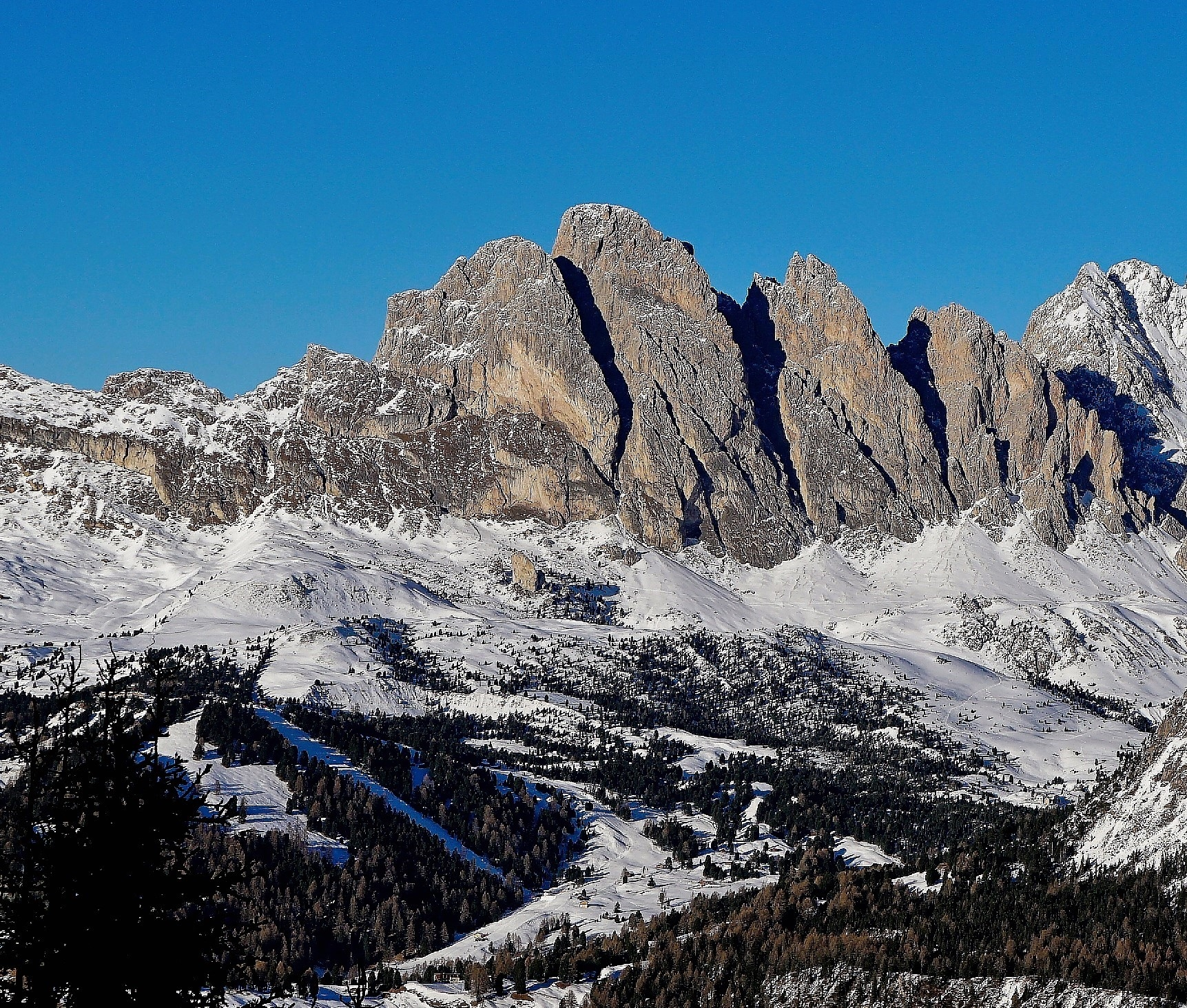
South aspect

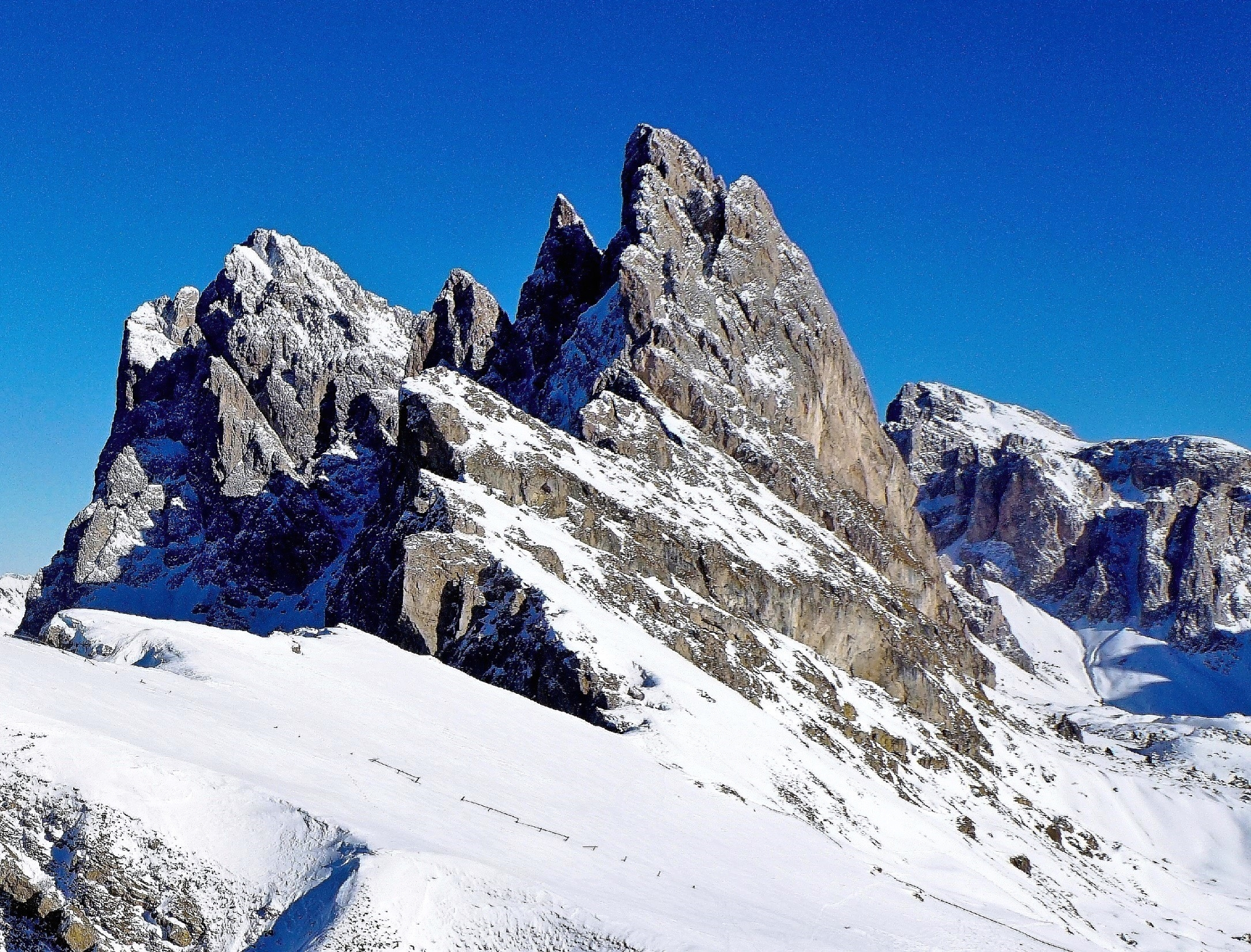
West aspect

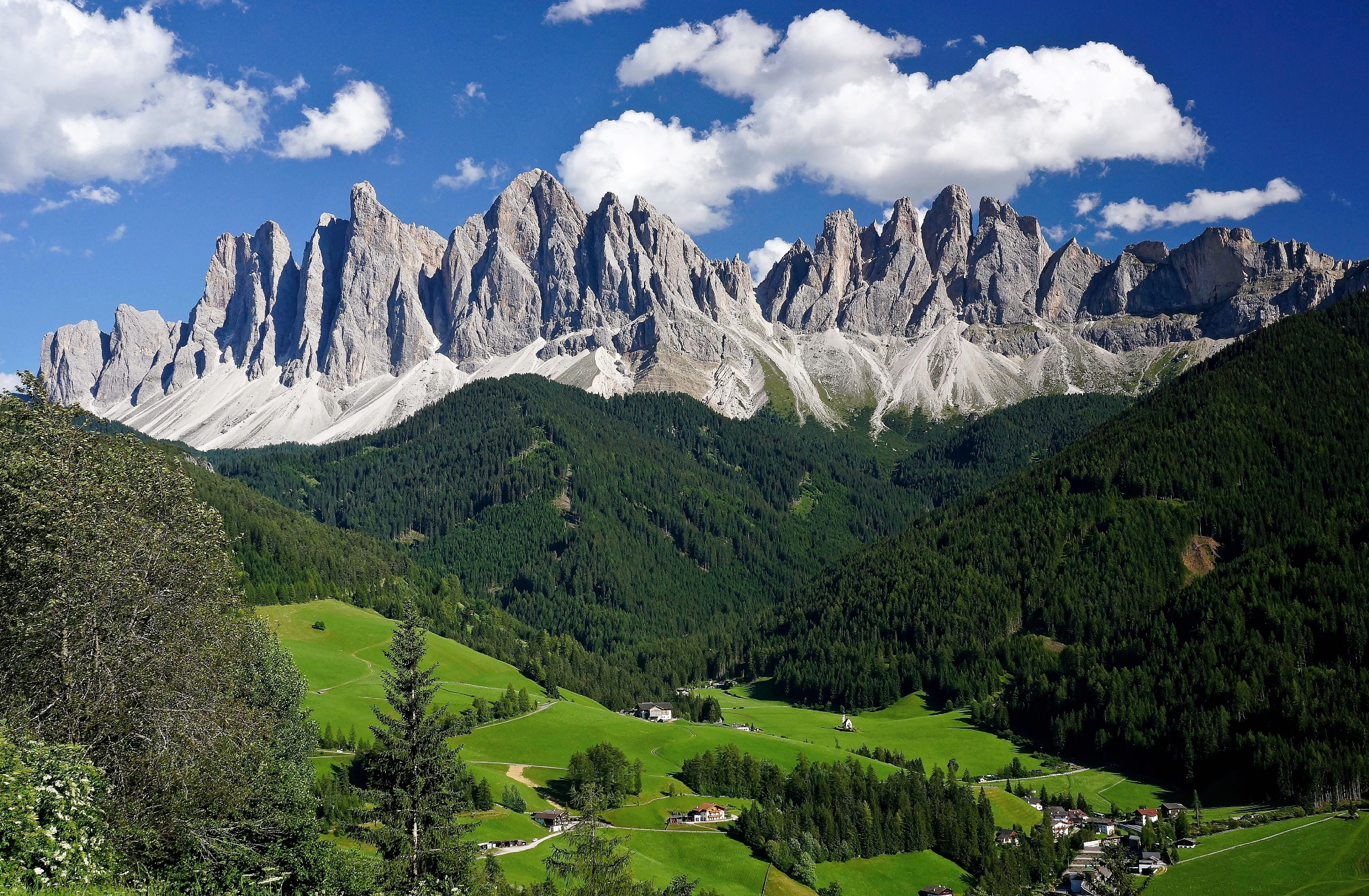
Grande Fermeda to the right

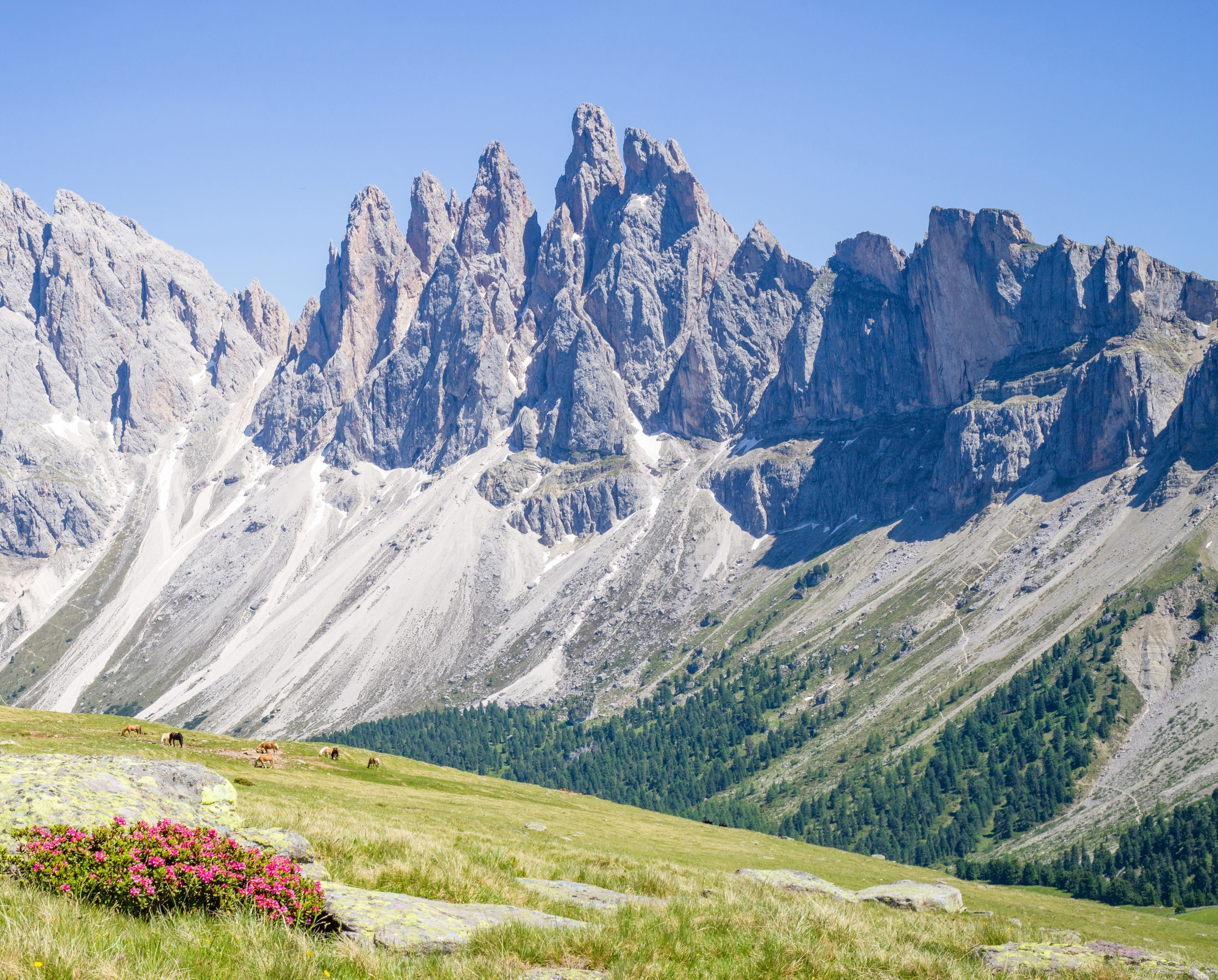
Northwest aspect

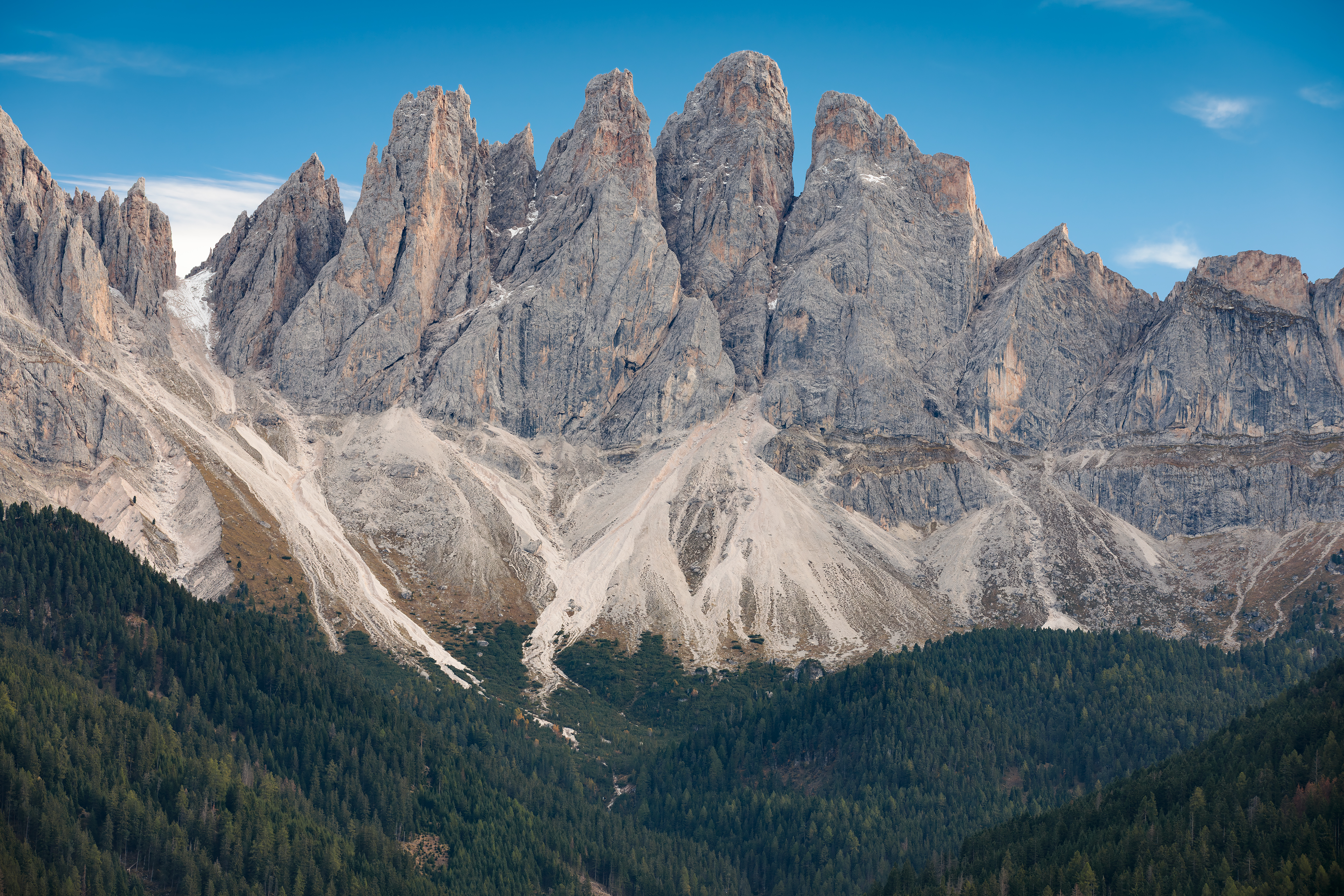

Grande Fermeda to the left

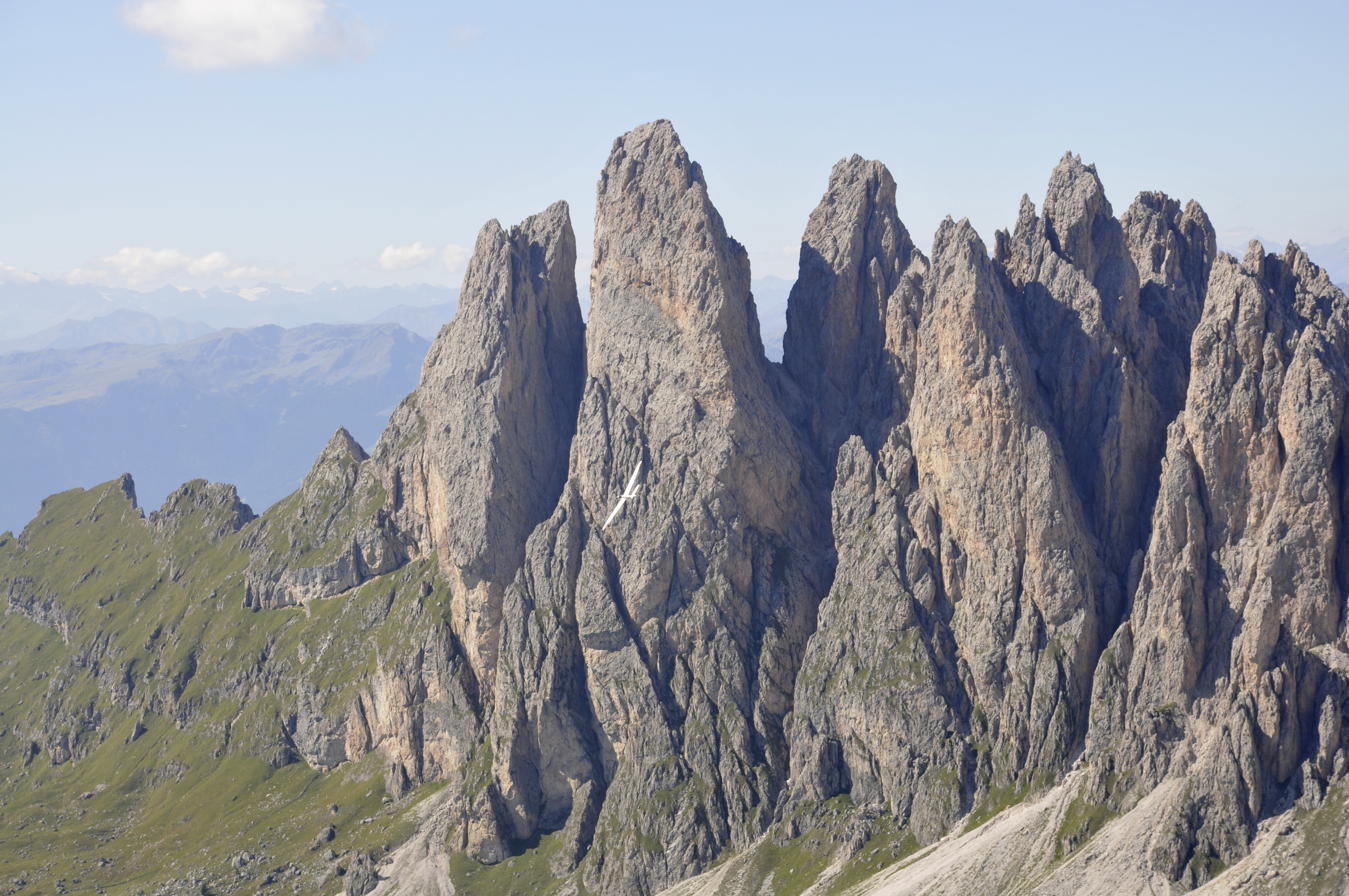
Grande Fermeda centered

== See also ==
- Southern Limestone Alps
