= Sas Rigais =

Mountain in Italy

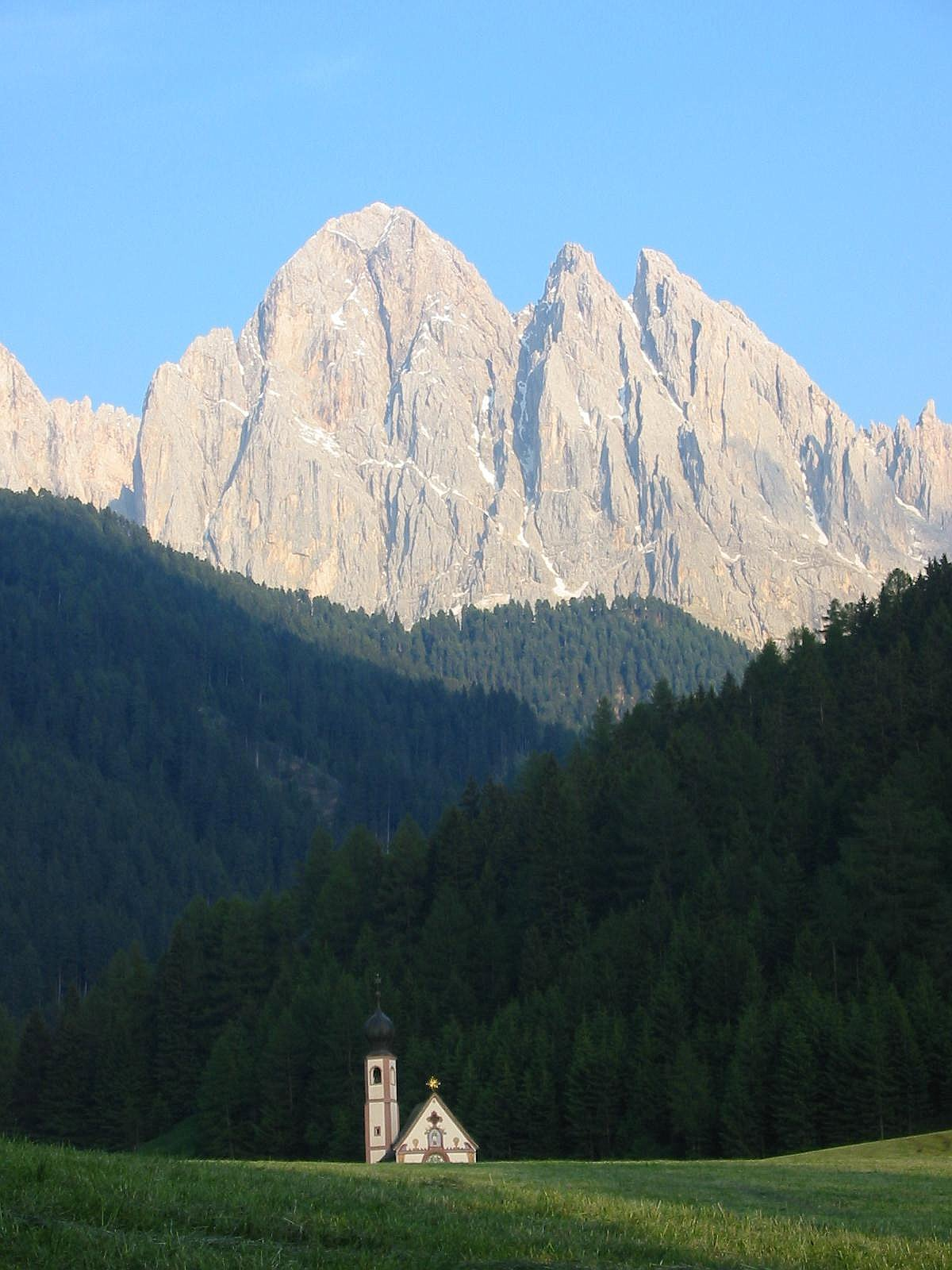
- Sas Rigais

Highest point
- Elevation: 3,025 m (9,925 ft)
- Listing: Alpine mountains above 3000 m
- Coordinates: 46°36′31.93″N 11°46′1.28″E

Geography
- Location within Alps
- Location: South Tyrol, Italy
- Parent range: Dolomites

Climbing
- Easiest route: Hike

Sas Rigais (3,025 m) is a mountain of the northwestern Dolomites in South Tyrol, northern Italy. Along with the nearby Furchetta, which is exactly the same height and only 600m away, it is the highest peak of the Geisler group. Sas Rigais offers hikers one of few Dolomites' three-thousanders the entire crossing from one side of the mountain to the other. The Via ferrata Villnössersteig is categorized between a B and C difficulty and the trail Sass Rigais steig is rated C. A crucifix is located at the summit.

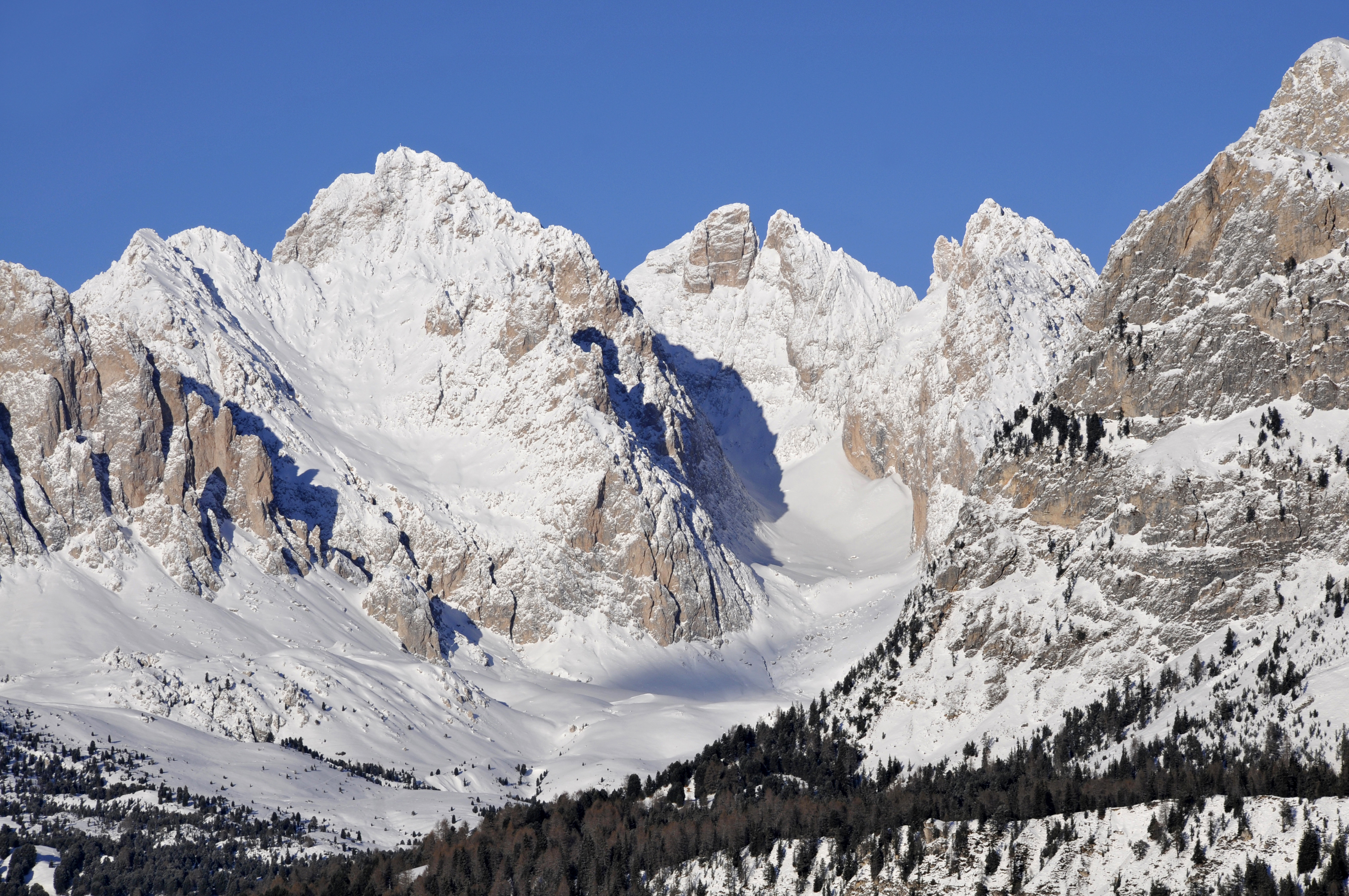
The Sas Rigais and Furchëta from the south

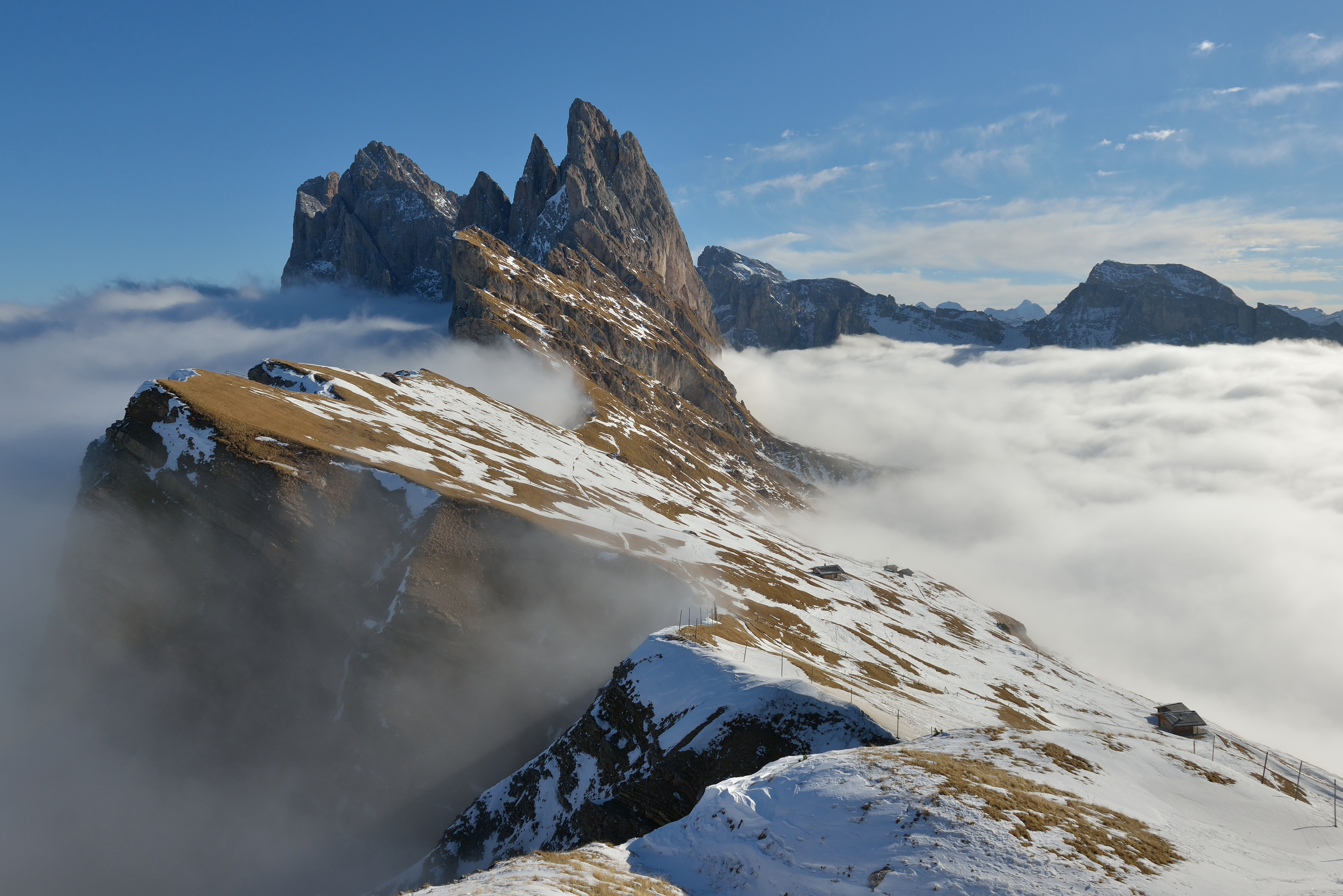
From left to right: Sas Rigais, Gran Fermeda, Col dala Pieres
