= Villnöß =

Villnöß Italian: Val di Funes Ladin: Val di Funès
- Comune
- Gemeinde Villnöß; Comune di Funes
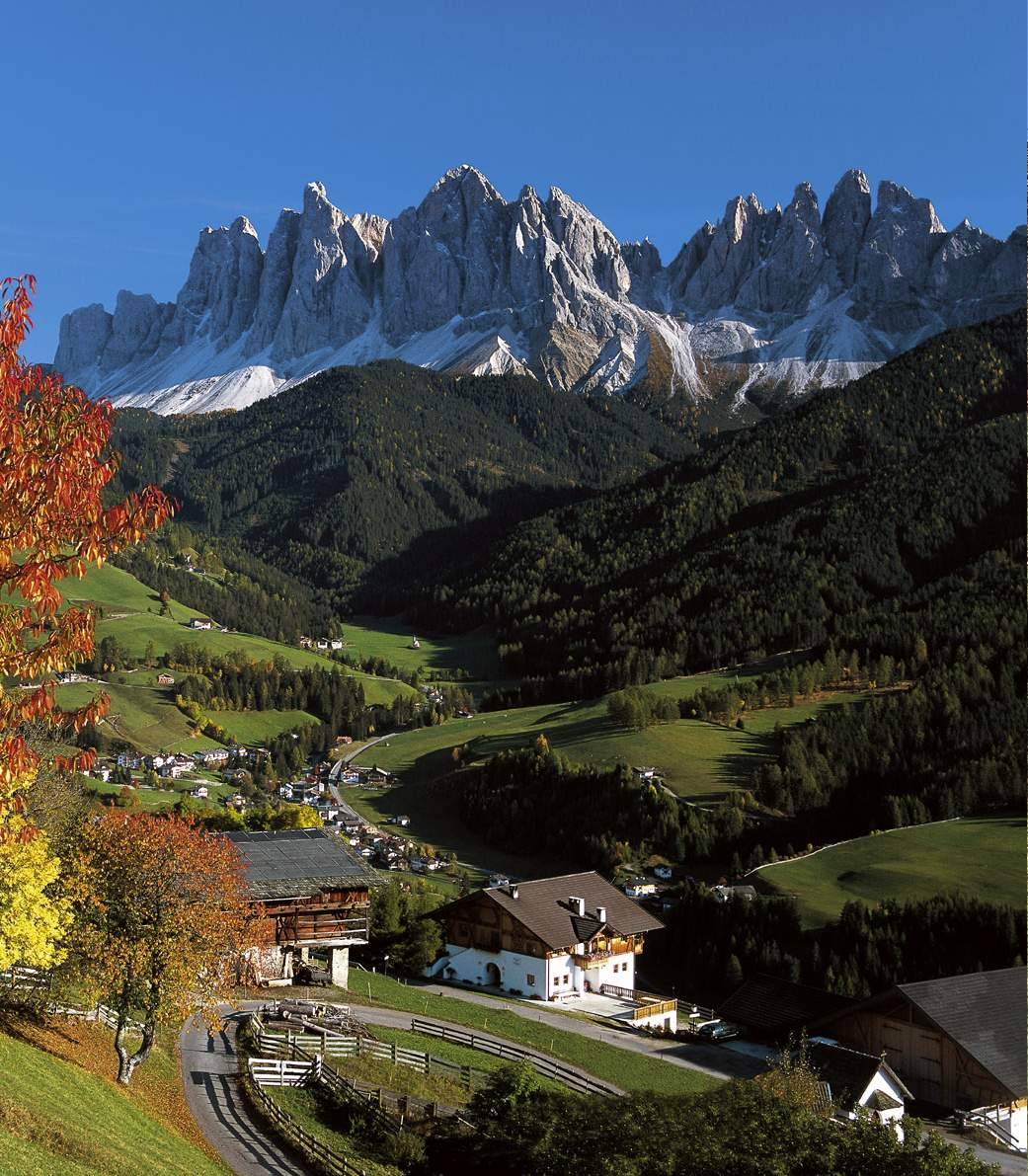
- View of Villnöß

- Coat of arms

- Location within Italy Location within Trentino-Alto Adige/Südtirol
- Coordinates: 46°39′N 11°41′E
- Country: Italy
- Region: Trentino-Alto Adige/Südtirol
- Province: South Tyrol (BZ)
- Frazioni: Koll (Colle), St. Jakob (San Giacomo), St. Magdalena (Santa Maddalena), St. Peter (San Pietro), St. Valentin (San Valentino) and Teis (Tiso)

Government
  - Mayor: Peter Pernthaler

Area
  - Total: 81.2 km^{2} (31.4 sq mi)
- Elevation: 1,132 m (3,714 ft)

Population (Nov 2010)
  - Total: 2,552
  - Density: 31.4/km^{2} (81.4/sq mi)
- Demonym(s): German: Villnößer; Italian: funesini
- Time zone: UTC+1 (CET)
  - Summer (DST): UTC+2 (CEST)
- Postal code: 39040
- Dialing code: 0472
- Website: Official website

Villnöß (German: [fɪlˈnœs]; Italian: Funes [fuˈnes]; Ladin: Funès) is a comune (municipality) in South Tyrol in north-eastern Italy, located about 30 kilometres (19 mi) northeast of the city of Bolzano.

== Geography ==
As of November 30, 2010, it had a population of 2,552 and an area of 81.2 square kilometres (31.4 mi^{2}).

The municipality of Villnöß contains the frazioni (subdivisions, mainly villages and hamlets) Koll (Colle), St Jakob (San Giacomo), St. Magdalena (Santa Maddalena), St Peter (San Pietro), St Valentin (San Valentino) and Teis (Tiso).

Villnöß borders the following municipalities: Brixen, Klausen, Lajen, Urtijëi, San Martin de Tor, Santa Cristina Gherdëina and Feldthurns.

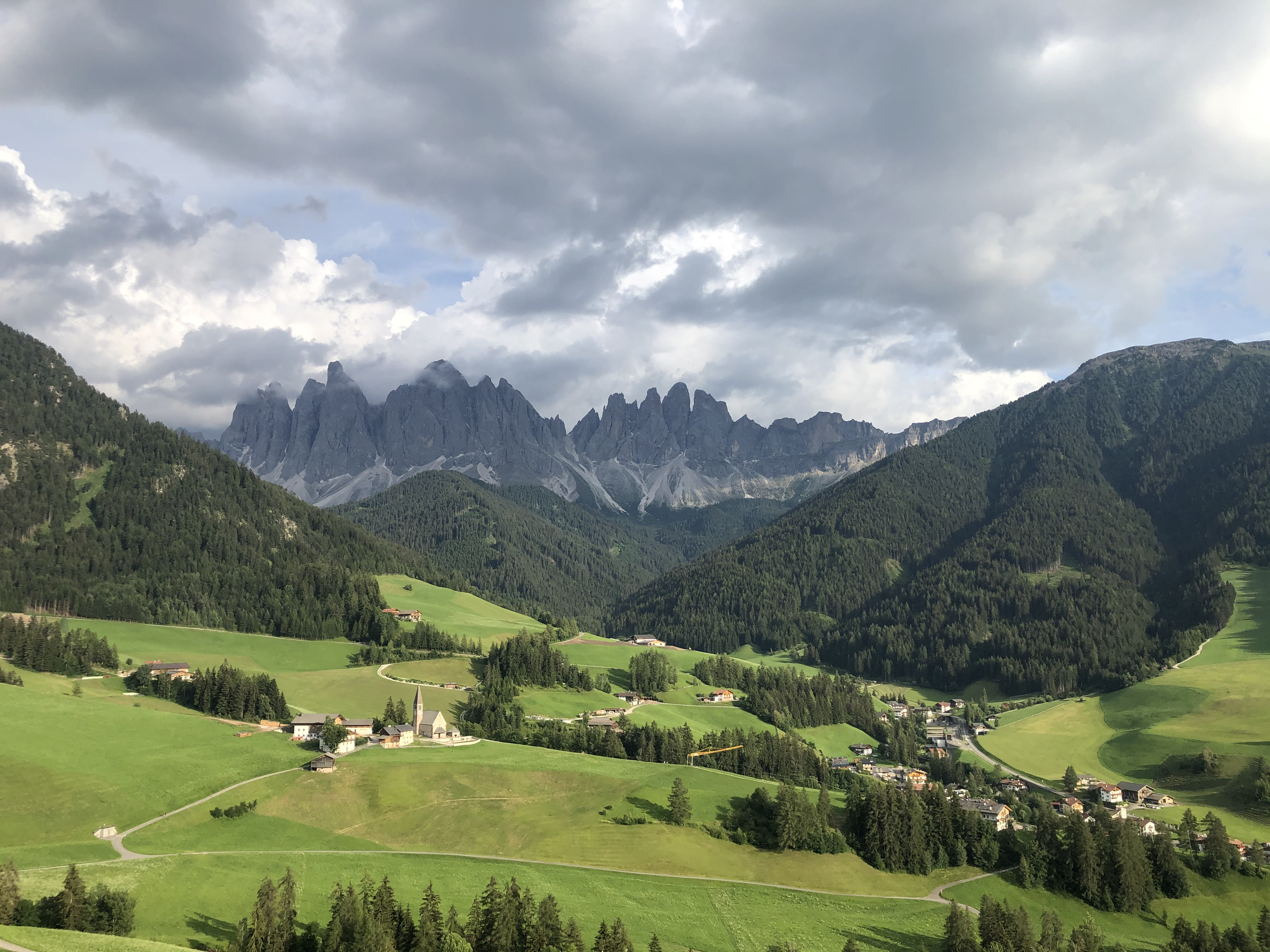
The village of St Magdalena with the Odles Group in the background

== History ==
=== Coat-of-arms ===
The emblem represents three piles of argent on azure, the three peaks symbolize the Odles Group in the head to the Valley of Funes. The emblem was adopted in 1967.

== Society ==
=== Linguistic distribution ===
According to the 2024 census, 96.97% of the population speak German, 2.49% Italian and 0.54% Ladin as first language.

== Demographic evolution ==
Historical population

Year	Pop.	±%
1861	?	—
1871	?	—
1881	?	—
1901	?	—
1911	?	—

Year	Pop.	±%
1921	1,570	—
1931	1,765	+12.4%
1936	1,979	+12.1%
1951	1,911	−3.4%
1961	2,050	+7.3%

Year	Pop.	±%
1971	2,167	+5.7%
1981	2,242	+3.5%
1991	2,309	+3.0%
2001	2,379	+3.0%

Source: Data from ISTAT
