= Villnößer Bach =

Location
- Country: Italy

Physical characteristics
- Mouth: Eisack
  - location: north of Klausen (South Tyrol)
  - coordinates: 46.6558°N 11.5950°E
- Length: 19.5 km (12.1 mi)
- Basin size: 73 km^{2} (28 sq mi)

Basin features
- Progression: Eisack→ Adige→ Adriatic Sea

The Villnößer Bach (Italian: Rio Funes) is a stream located in South Tyrol, Italy. It rises from the Geislerspitze mountain range, flows through the Villnößtal, ending after about 20 kilometres (12 mi) to the left downstream of Feldthurns in the Eisack river. Main tributaries are the St. Zenobach (Rio San Zeno) and the Flitzer Bach (Rio Valluzza). The course of the river is entirely within the village of Villnöß, bordering the frazioni (municipal subdivisions) of St. Magdalena (Santa Maddalena) and St. Peter (San Pietro).
