= Furchëta =

Mountain in Italy

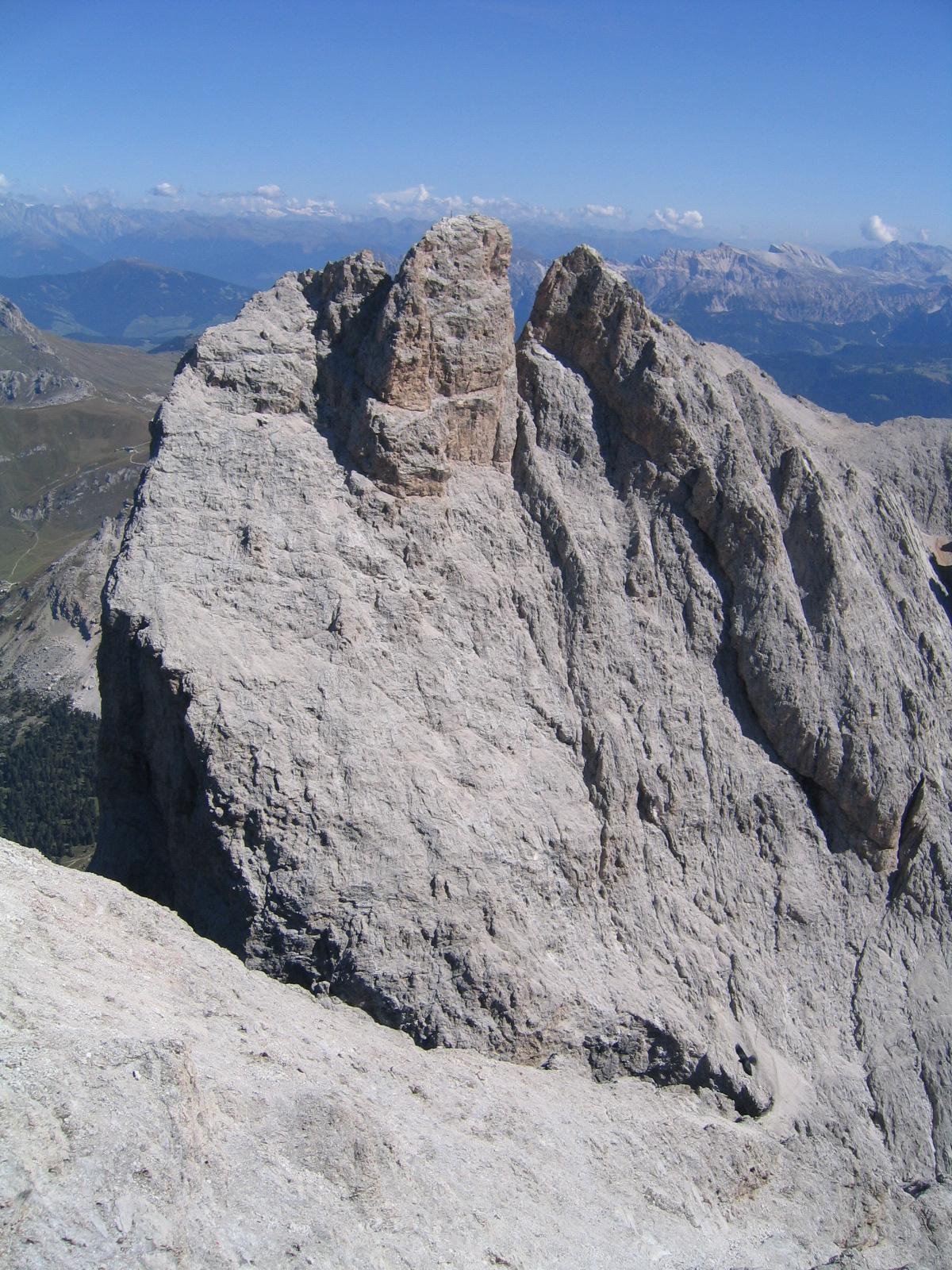

Highest point
- Elevation: 3,025 m (9,925 ft)
- Listing: Alpine mountains above 3000 m
- Coordinates: 46°36′46.1″N 11°46′24.6″E

Geography
- Location: South Tyrol, Italy
- Parent range: Dolomites

The Furchëta is a mountain of the Geisler group in the Dolomites in South Tyrol, Italy.

The Furchëta mountain is in the group of Odle and has been named after the great rift that divides it in two. The starting point of the mountain is in the Refuge Florence, which is reached in about 20 minutes from the mountain station of the gondola Santa Cristina Col Raiser.
