= Mary Lloyd Wynne =

British mycologist (1813/1816–1895)

Mary Anne Frances Lloyd Wynne
- Born: Mary Anne Frances Haggitt; Birth date 1813 - 1816; Fen Ditton, Cambridge
- Died: Death date 2 August 1895; Bielerhof Hotel, Bienne, Switzerland
- Known for: mycological collecting

Mary Lloyd Wynne (1813/1816 - 1895) is notable for collecting and painting fungi at Coed Coch, Denbighshire, Wales in the mid-nineteenth century, as well as other regions in Britain and Europe. She collaborated with mycologists such as Miles Berkeley and Christopher Broome. Five species were named after her as well as genera.

== Personal life ==
Mary Anne Frances Lloyd Wynne (née Haggitt) was the daughter of John Haggitt, rector of St Mary the Virgin, Fen Ditton, near Cambridge, and Frances (née Peyton), daughter of Sir Henry Peyton of Doddington, Cambridgeshire. She was born between 1813 - 1816, probably in Fen Ditton. She married John Lloyd Wynne (1807-87) on 3 September 1833, at St. Mary’s, Fen Ditton. He was a Welsh landowner, whose extensive estates in North Wales included the Coed Coch estate. They had two children, Henry John Lloyd Wynne (1834-93) who became a captain in the 2nd Lifeguards and Edward (1836-93) who was promoted to major general in the Grenadier Guards (son of Edward also Edward kia 1916). Her husband died in London in 19=887 and she then lived in the Paddington area in London, but continued to visit North Wales. She died in the Bielerhof Hotel, Bienne, Switzerland on 23 August 1895.

== Mycological activity ==
Lloyd Wynne became interested in mycology and developed contacts with several of the leading mycologists and mycological groups of the day through the field visits that she organised. She collaborated with a local naturalist, Alfred Osten Walker and hosted others keen on fungi, including groups of the Woolhope Naturalists' Field Club from Herefordshire. She also travelled to Herefordshire on fungal forays with the Woolhope Club, such as in 1880.

By 1858 her involvement in mycology was noted through her being the source of a specimen of Agaricus (Tricholoma) bufonius from the Coed Coch estate noted by Miles Berkeley and Christopher Broome as the first record of the species in the UK. Two years later Berkeley dedicated his book Outlines of British Fungology to her, noting ‘the zeal with which she has studied the numerous fungi of her beautiful country’ (meaning Wales). Berkeley's daughter Ruth Ellen Berkeley visited Coed Coch and as well as recording fungi, she also drew some of them, with her drawings remaining with Lloyd Wynne. In 1868, Lloyd Wynne, along with Lady Dorothy Nevill, donated prizes in a competition for the best collection of edible fungi, organised by Berkeley on behalf of the Royal Horticultural Society in South Kensington, London. The winner was Henry Graves Bull.

=== Illustrations ===
Lloyd Wynne made illustrations of the fungal fruiting bodies that she saw. The earliest that survives was made in Venice in 1857. She bequeathed them to Alfred Osten Walker, who subsequently donated them to the Chester Society for Natural Science. They were initially housed in the Grosvenor Museum, Chester but in 1957 transferred to Royal Botanic Gardens, Kew. Some of the illustrations were considered to be type specimens when they were made.

=== Fungal specimen collections ===
She collected specimens during forays with the Woolhope Club, as well as at Coed Coch and on travels such as in Scotland. This is known because labelled specimens with this information are now in the Kew Herbarium. In addition, she is cited as the source of specimens of species new or unusual in Britain in accounts written by some of the men mycologists in natural history magazines and books, such as Handbook of British Fungi (1871) by Mordecai Cubitt Cooke. These specimens are distinct from those collected by others, such as Berkeley, on visits to the Coed Coch estate.

== Legacy ==
Five species of fungi were named after her during her lifetime, Marasmius wynnei (now M. wynneae), Polyporus wynnei (later Loweomyces wynneae), Agaricus wynnei (later Entoloma wynneae), Hiatula wynniae (later Leucocoprinus wynneae) and Hygrophorus wynniae (later Chrysomphalina grossula). In addition, Berkeley and Moses Ashley Curtis named a new ascomycete genus Wynnea after her in 1867 for new fungi collected from Mexico and India. A new, related, genus Wynnella in the Sarcosomataceae was subsequently been named for her in 1885 by Jean Louis Émile Boudier.

There are 71 of her drawings and paintings, in four albums, now in the Kew Herbarium. There are a few paintings by others in the albums, notably Ruth Berkeley and (possibly) Miles Berkeley. In addition, many of the specimens that she collected are in the Berkeley and Broome Fungarium, also at Royal Botanic Gardens, Kew.

In 2026, a Purple Plaque was installed in St Michael's churchyard, Betws-yn-Rhos to recognise her impact on British mycology.
