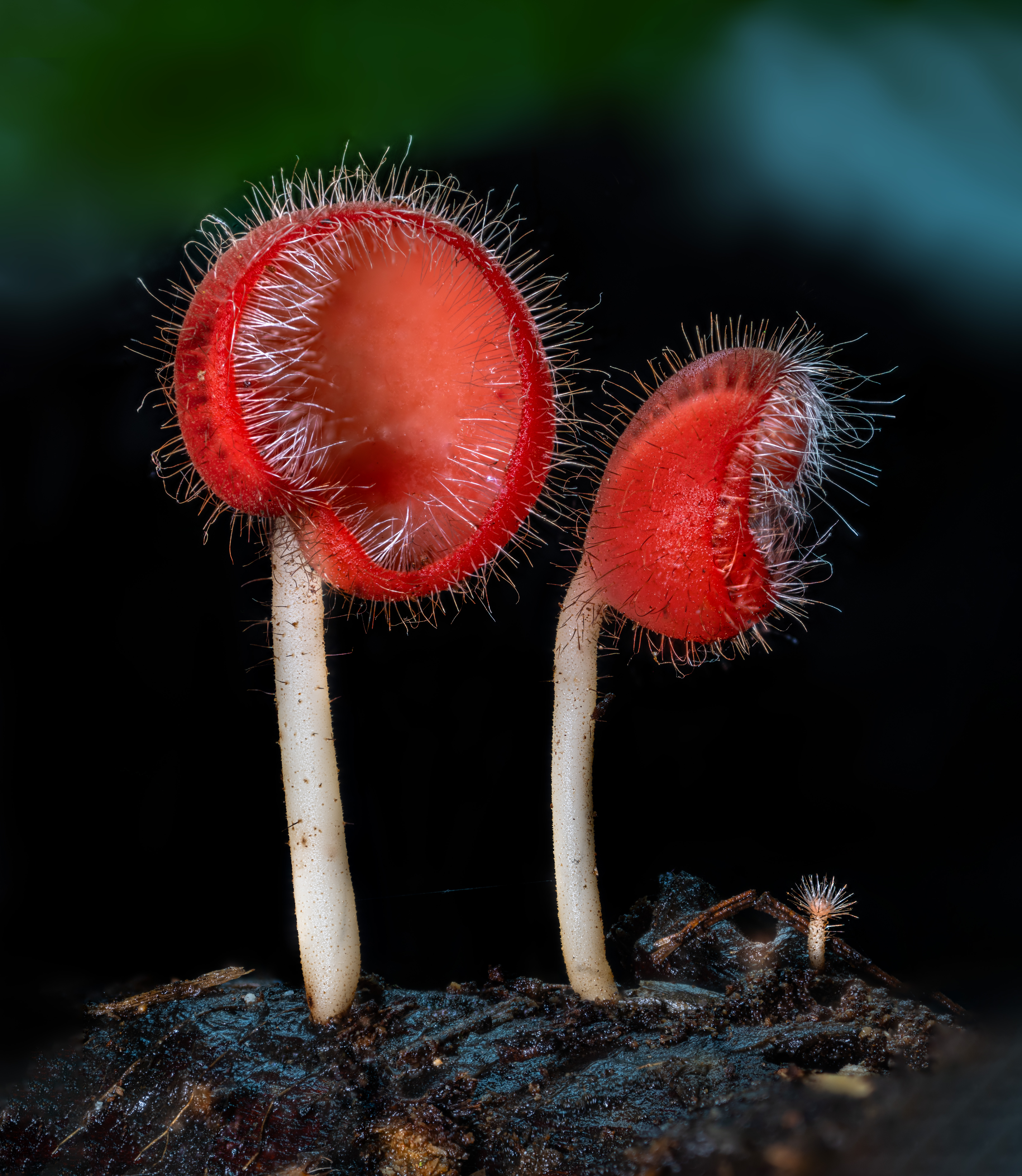
- Cookeina tricholoma in Ecuador

Scientific classification
- Domain: Eukaryota
- Kingdom: Fungi
- Division: Ascomycota
- Class: Pezizomycetes
- Order: Pezizales
- Family: Sarcoscyphaceae
- Genus: Cookeina; Kuntze (1891)

Type species
- Cookeina tricholoma (Mont.) Kuntze (1891)

Species
- See text

= Cookeina =

Genus of fungi

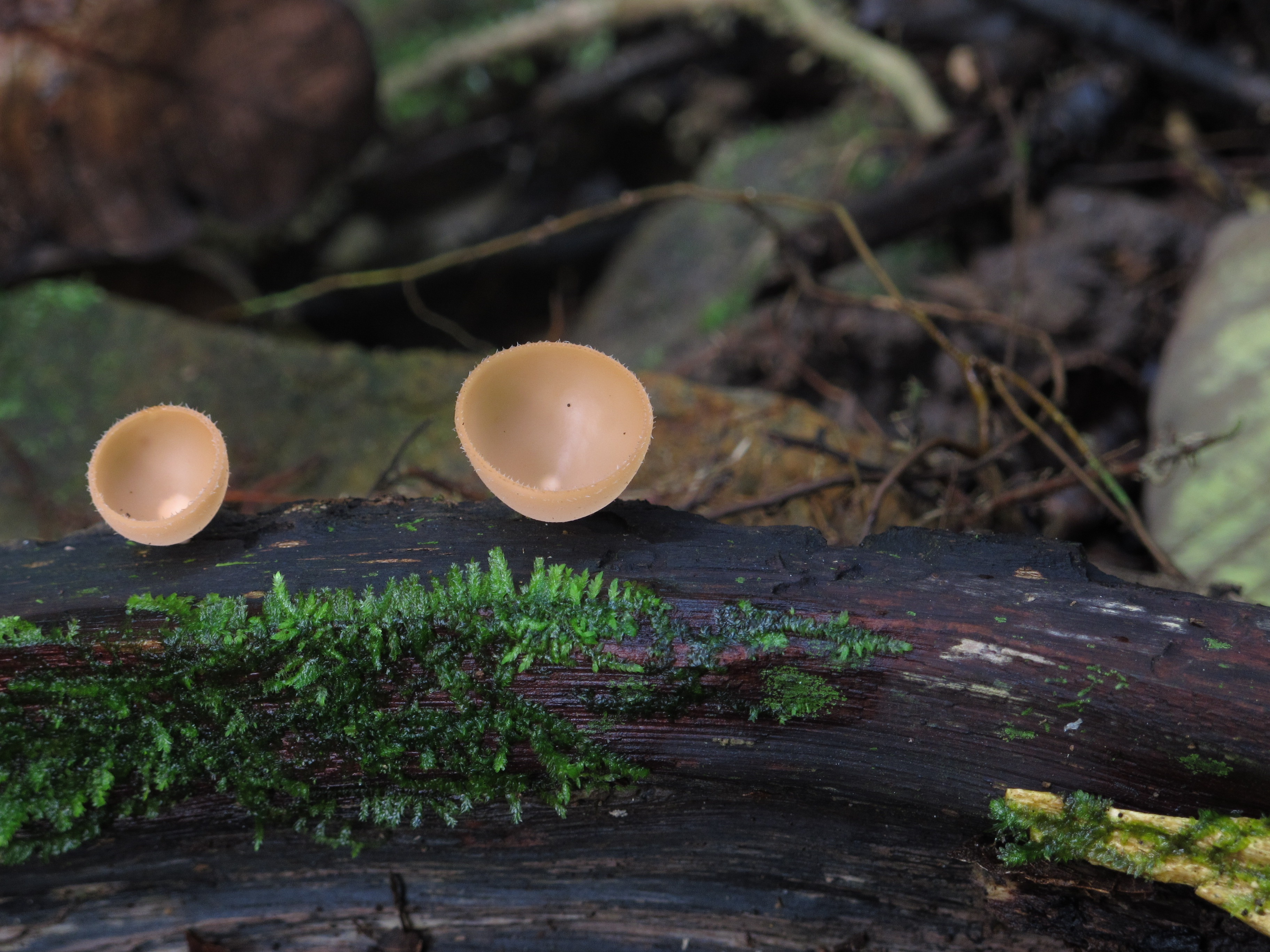
Cookeina sulcipes from Malaysia.

Cookeina is a genus of cup fungi in the family Sarcoscyphaceae, members of which may be found in tropical and subtropical regions of the world. Species may be found on fallen branches of angiosperms, trunks, and sometimes on fruits. The Temuans of Peninsular Malaysia are reported to use certain species from this genus as food, and also as a bait for fishing, where it is rubbed against the hook.

== Description ==
Species in the Cookeina have a deep, cup-shaped to funnel-shaped fruiting bodies, or apothecia. The inner spore-bearing surface of the apothecium, the hymenium, is brightly colored, yellow to red, although the color will fade upon drying. The outer surface is less brightly colored. The excipulum, the tissue making up the walls of the apothecium, is thin and flexible. When hairs are present on the apothecium, they are fasciculate—made of bundles of cylindrical hyphae.

=== Microscopic features ===
The Cookeina have asci which are constricted abruptly below and form a blunt, rounded base with a slim, tail-like connection. They have asci which mature simultaneously rather than in series. They have paraphyses which anastomose and form a three-dimensional network. Ascospores are large (20—40 μm long), ellipsoidal or slightly unequal-sided, and either smooth or ornamented with fine wrinkles.

The genus appears to be restricted to wood, commonly to wood in early stages of decay.

== Mechanism of spore release ==
When mature apothecia become filled with water, the asci absorb some of that water and develop a Turgor pressure, a hydrostatic pressure within the ascus which put pressure on the tip of the ascus, held in place by the rigid ascus wall. As the water level in the cup reduces due to evaporation, the asci tips dry out, resulting in a negative vapor pressure that ultimately results in the thin tissue at the wall of the apex (the operculum) breaking outward, releasing the spores.

== Taxonomy ==
The genus name of Cookeina is in honour of Mordecai Cubitt Cooke (1825–1914), who was an English botanist and mycologist.

The genus was circumscribed by Carl Ernst Otto Kuntz in Revis. Gen. Pl. Vol.2 on page 849 in 1891.

== Phylogeny ==
Phylogenetic analyses of ribosomal DNA has helped to clarify the evolutionary and genetic relationships amongst the species in Cookeina. The species C. speciosa, C. tricholoma, and C. sinensis belong to a monophyletic group, and all are hairy, with stipes, and lack a well-defined layer of slime in the excipulum at maturity. Another monophyletic grouping contains the species C. Venezuela and C. colensoi, which do have a slime layer on the excipulum, and have either short stipes or not at all (sessile). In this analysis, C. indica and C. insititia did not clearly resolve with the other clades.

The presence of some unique physical characteristics in the species C. insititia has made its taxonomic status uncertain, and a source of some debate in the literature— some authors have supported its segregation into the genus Boedijnopeziza, and others have questioned this interpretation. Based on a study of ultrastructural characteristics using electron microscopy, a possible solution to the taxonomic conundrum was suggested in 2003, to segregate C. insititia into a subgenus Boedijnopeziza within the Cookeina.

== Species ==
Cookeina colensoi (Berk.) Seaver (1913).
Basionym Peziza colensoi Berk (1855).
Apothecia cupulate, subsessile to stipitate, 5–19 mm in diameter when dry, receptacle surface smooth; gelatinous layer present in the inner ectal excipulum, 40–50 μm thick, cells of axes somewhat perpendicular to receptacle surface; asci suboperculate, 330–360 × 12.5–13 μm. Ascospores are subfusoid-ellipsoid, smooth-walled, contain two or three oil droplets, and have dimensions of 27–30 × 10.5–12 μm. Known from the South Pacific and South America, and Cameroon. Weinstein and Pfister characterize the distribution as sub-tropical, but more prevalent in the southern hemisphere.

Cookeina colensoiopsis Iturr. & Pfister (2006).

Cookeina globosa Douanla-Meli (2005).

This species is known only from the Mbalmayo rain forest reserve in southern Cameroon.

Cookeina indica Pfister & R. Kaushal (1984).
Apothecia deeply discoid, up to 15 mm in diameter, sessile to stipitate, stalks less than 4 mm long; hymenium ochraceous-oray, receptacle concolorous with or lightly darker than the hymenium when dry, surface smooth; ectal excipulum of texture angularis, about 50–70 μm thick, with some hair-like structures made up of several cells; medullary excipulum of textura intricata, about 175 μm thick; asci 320–350 × 5–18 μm; ascospores ellipsoid to subfusoid, 3-guttulate, surface with longitudinal ridges, 27.5–35 × 10–13 μm.

Cookeina insititia (Berk. & M.A. Curtis) Kuntze (1891).

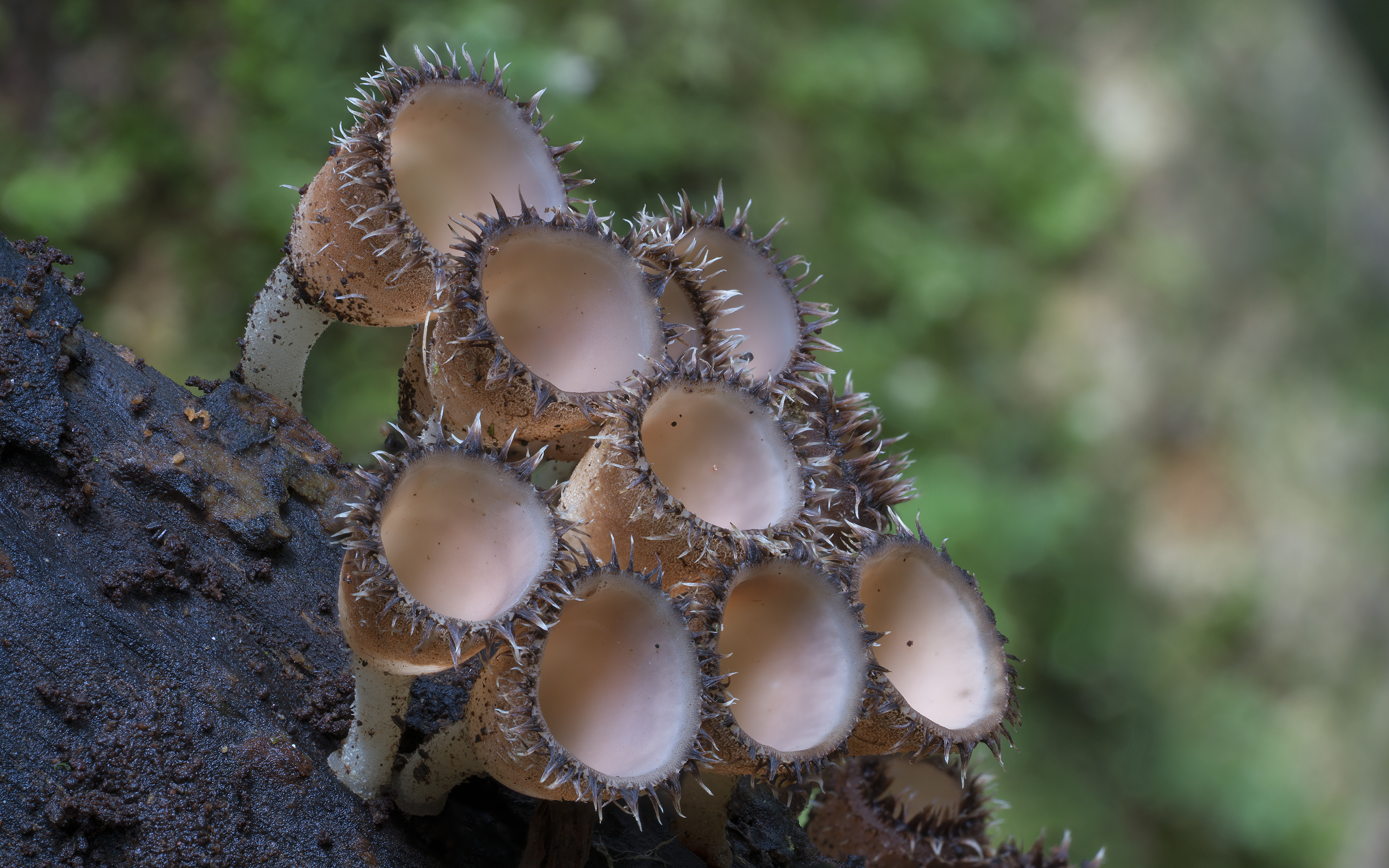
C. insititia

Apothecia deeply cupulate, 3–6 mm in diameter when dry; ectal excipulum of texture subglobulosa to textura angularis, with a gelatinous layer about 40–85 μm thick in ectal excipulum; triangular scalelike hairs arising from ectal excipulum forming several rings along apothecial margin, less than 4 mm long; medullary excipulum of textura intricata, 45–100 μm thick; hymenium about 380–430 μm; asci 400–440 × 13–17 μm; ascospores fusoid, smooth, multiguttulate, 45–53.5 × 9–13 μm. Distribution restricted to the western Pacific Basin.

Cookeina sinensis Z. Wang (1997).
Apothecia solitary, cupulate, stipitate, up to 25 mmm high and 50 mm in diameter when dry, hymenium ochraceous-orange to raw sienna, receptacle cinnamon-buff when dry; conspicuously hairy; hairs fasciculate, arising from medullary excipulum, stiff, bristle-like, up to 6–7 mm long; ectal excipulum of textura angularis, about 50 μm thick, cells thick-walled, hyaline, 7–13 × 15–25 μm; medullary excipulum of textura intricata, 230–300 μm thick; asci suboperculate, 8-spored, long cylindrical, narrow-hyphoid at base, thick-walled, J-Melzer's reagent, 280–290 × 16–7 μm; ascospores smooth-walled, subfusoid to lemon-shaped, biguttulate with droplets up to 9 μm in diameter, 25–28 × 12–12.5 μm; paraphyses moniliform, anastomosing and septate.

Cookeina speciosa (Fr.) Dennis (1994).

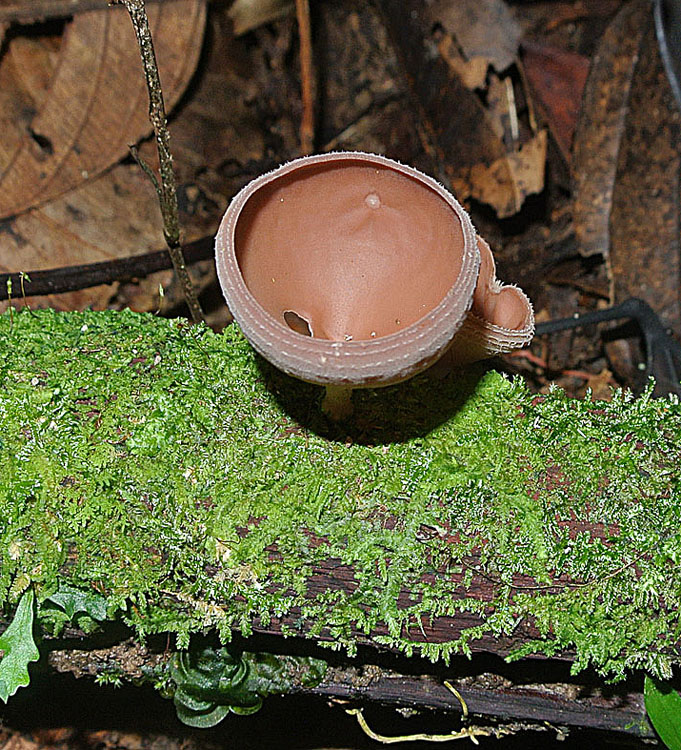
C. speciosa (Colombia)

Apothecia funnel-shaped, stipitate, rarely sessile, margin covered with fine, inconspicuous hairs; hairs fasciculate, less than 3 mm long; asci 300–400 × 17–20 μm; ascospores ellipsoid, biguttulate, surface with fine longitudinal ridges, 25–29 × 13–15 μm.
This species has more pronounced variations in color, and is thought to represent a species complex.

Cookeina sulcipes (Berk.) Kuntze (1891).

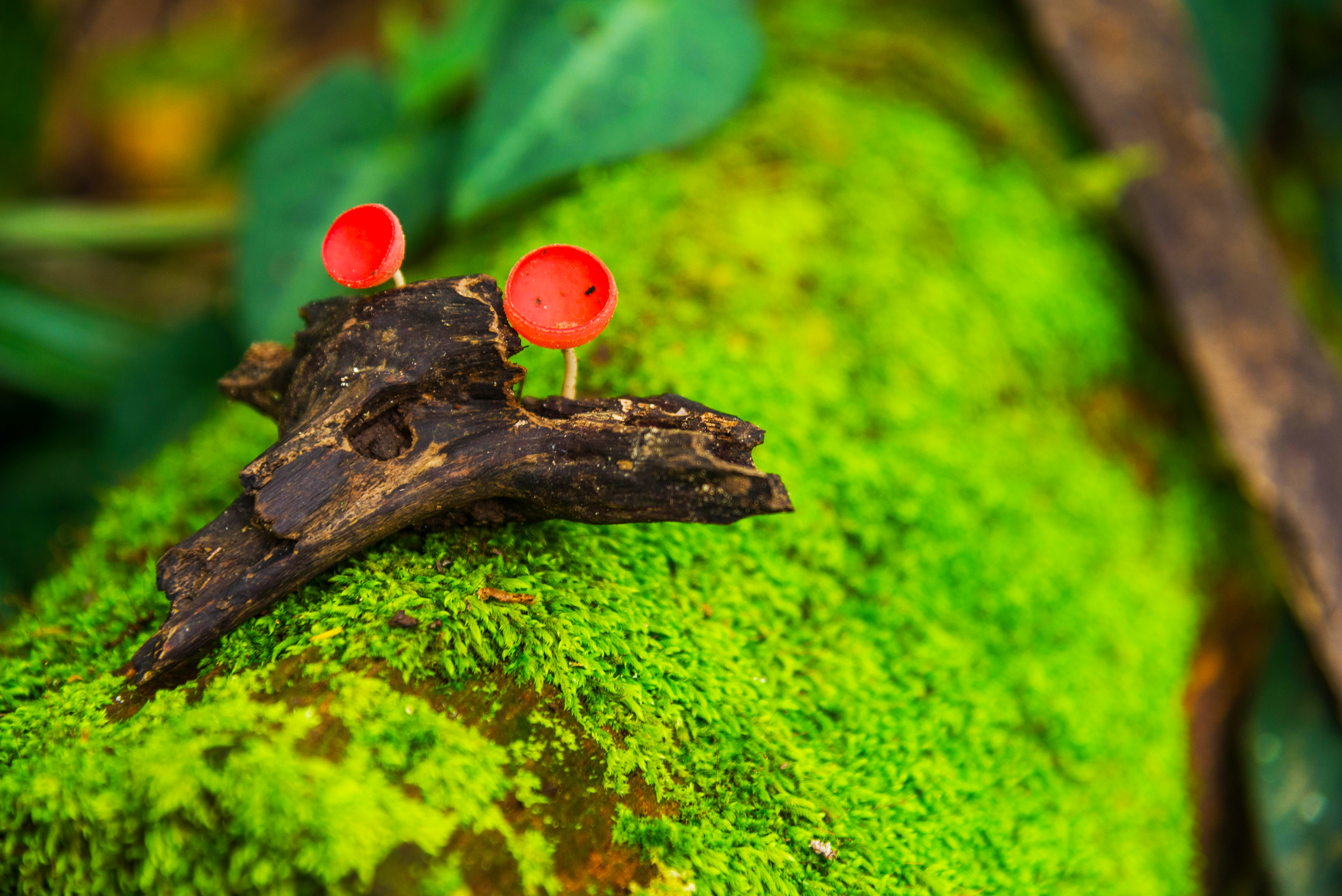
C. sulcipes

Basionym Peziza sulcipes Berk. (1842).
Apothecia are goblet- to funnel-shaped, grow solitary to clustered on wood at altitudes less than 700 metres (2,300 ft), and have dimensions of 2–4 cm (0.8–2 in) in diameter by 3–6 cm (1–2 in) tall. The stipe is slender, 3–4 mm thick, and 1–4 cm (0.4–2 in) long. The hymenium surface is pink to buff in color, while the outer surface is less brightly colored. Ascospores have a cylindrical or ellipsoid shape, containing two large oil drops, covered with fine longitudinal wrinkles, and have dimensions of 25–33 × 14–18 μm. This species is distributed through the lowlands of Central America, Mexico, the Caribbean, South America, Africa, and Asia.

Cookeina tricholoma (Mont.) Kuntze (1891).
Synonyms include Peziza tricholoma Mont., (1834), Pilocratera tricholoma (Mont.) Henn., and Trichoscypha tricholoma (Mont.) Cooke, (1889).

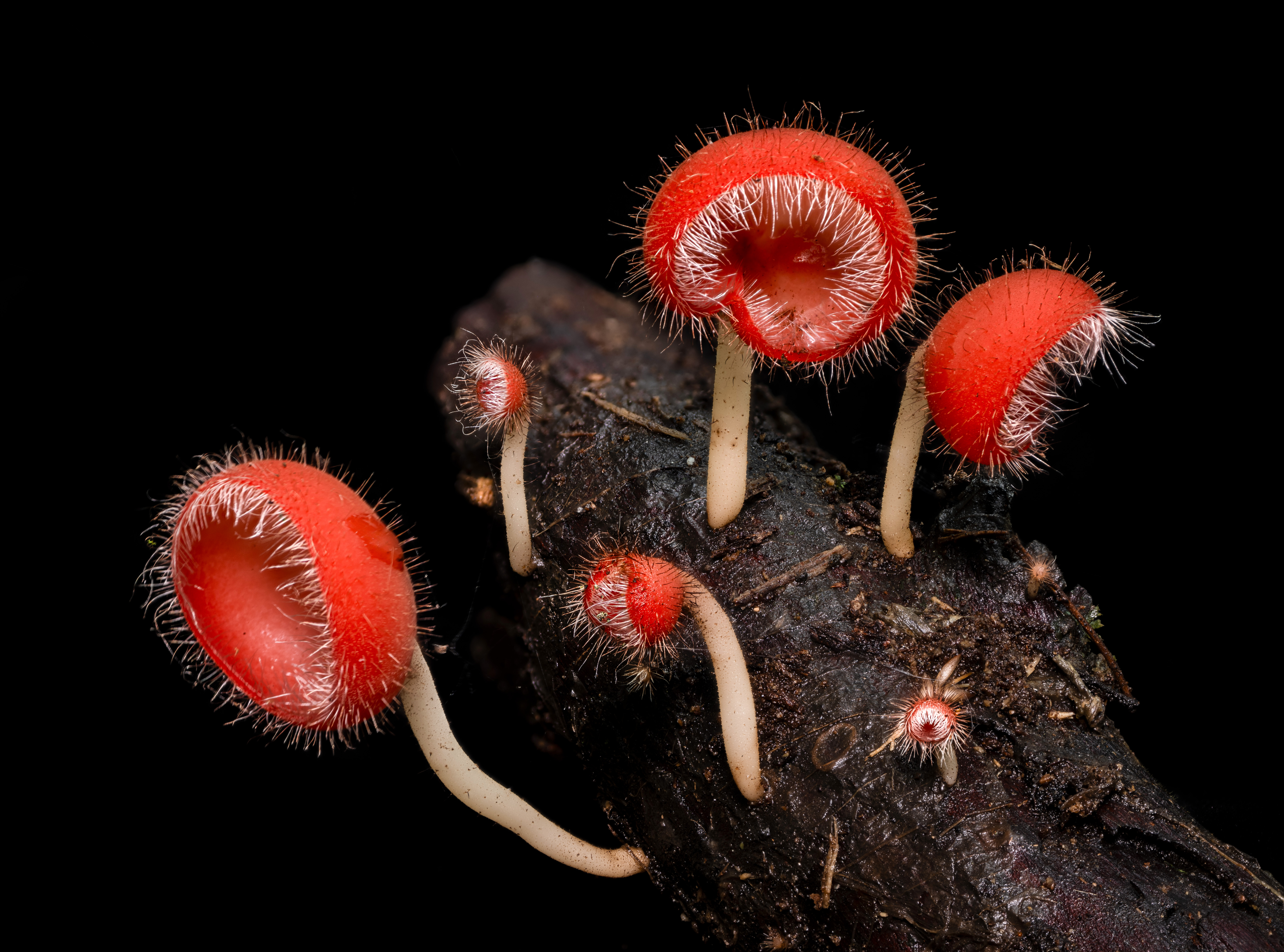
C. tricholoma

Apothecia are goblet to funnel-shaped with an inrolled margin, 1–2 cm (0.4–0.8 in) in diameter, with slender stipes that are 1–3 cm (0.4–1 in) tall, The apothecia are conspicuously hairy; hairs stiff, bristle-like, fasciculate, and usually 2–3 mm long. Its asci are 280–350 × 13–18 μm. The ascospores pointed-ellipsoid, surface with fine, longitudinal ridges, biguttulate, 25–35 × 11–13.5 μm. The typical habitat is on wood like twigs and rotten tree limbs, at low altitudes (usually below 1000 m), in the tropics. The distribution of this species includes the lowlands of Central America, Mexico, the Caribbean, South America, Africa, Asia, Australia, and the South Pacific.

Cookeina venezuelae (Berk. & Curt in Cooke) Le Gal (1953).
Basionym Peziza venezuela.
Apothecia do not have stipes, are pink to light orange in color, bowl-shaped, smooth, and typically 8–15 mm in diameter × 5–10 mm deep. Ascospores are ellipsoid, pale yellow, contain two large oil drops, have wrinkles and ribs on the surface, and dimensions of 33–36 × 11–13 μm. They grow solitary to clustered on wood, at elevations of 800–1,500 metres (2,600–4,900 ft) in the tropics. The distribution of this less common species is limited to Central America, northern South America, and the Caribbean.

== Similar genera ==
Three other tropical genera of the family Sarcoscyphaceae, Phillipsia, Sarcoscypha, and Geodina, have brightly colored apothecia which might be confused with those of Cookeina. Although these genera may be distinguished microscopically because they all have asci which mature seriatim rather than simultaneously and paraphyses which do not anastomose to form a reticulum, distinguishing on the basis of macroscopic characters is less reliable. Species of Phyllipsia have apothecia that are saucer-shaped to discoid, thick-fleshed, and usually sessile. In Sarcoscypha the apothecia vary from saucer-shaped to cup-shaped and are usually stipitate. In Geodina the apothecia are cup-shaped, stipitate, and occur on soil. Another similar genus, Scutellinia, has eyelash-like hairs around the margin of a red or orange apothecia, but lacks a stipe.
