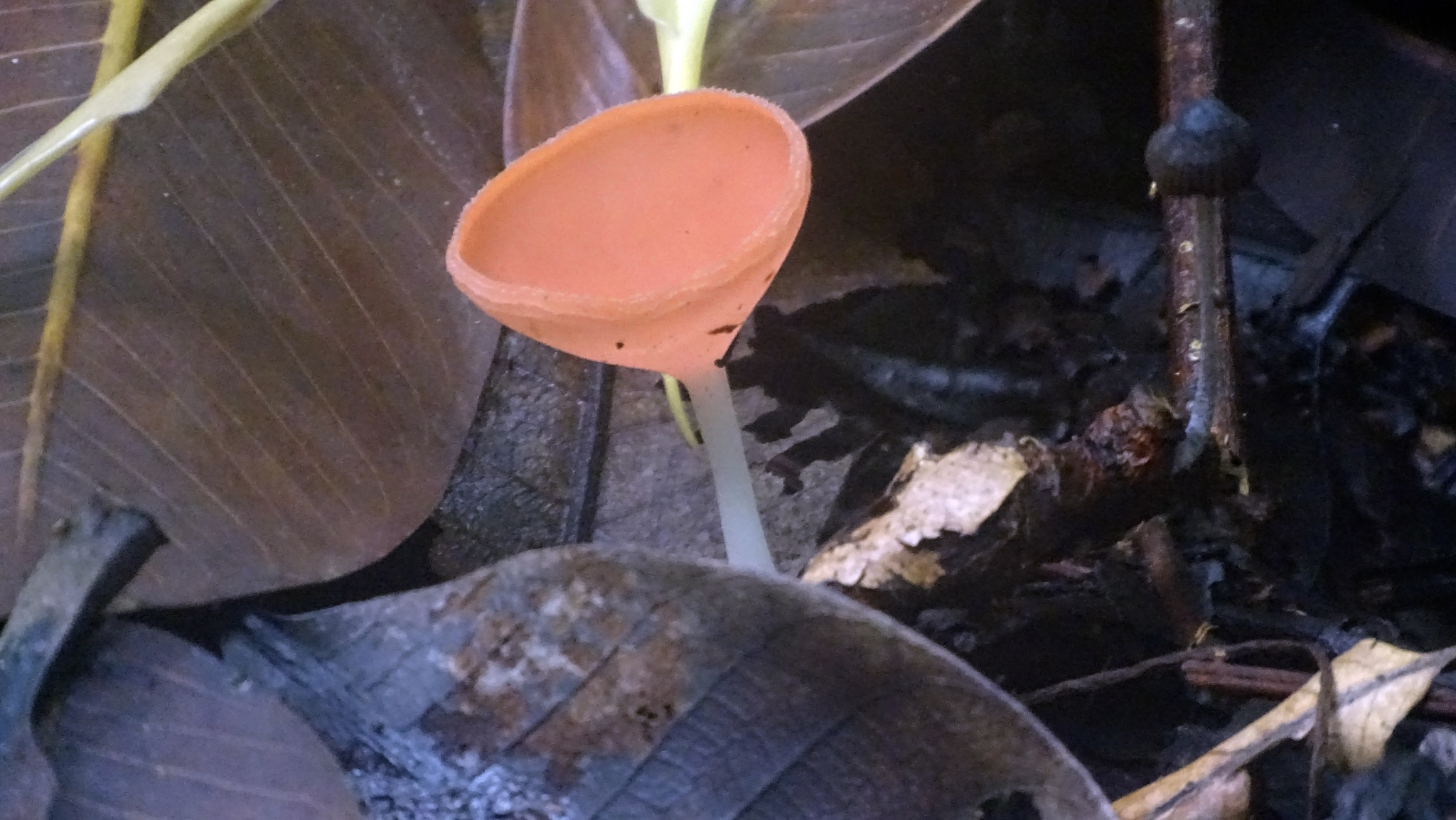

Scientific classification
- Domain: Eukaryota
- Kingdom: Fungi
- Division: Ascomycota
- Class: Pezizomycetes
- Order: Pezizales
- Family: Sarcoscyphaceae
- Genus: Cookeina
- Species: C. speciosa

Binomial name
- Cookeina speciosa (Fr.) Dennis (1994)

Synonyms
- Peziza speciosa Fr. (1822)

= Cookeina speciosa =

Species of fungus

Cookeina speciosa is a species of fungus in the family Sarcoscyphaceae.

== Description ==
Cookeina speciosa is the most common species of its genus. Its colours vary. Colour variants are white over yellow, pinkish red, yellow-orange, and orange to chocolate brown colour apothecia. The species can be found both in isolation and in group.

== Taxonomy ==
The fungus was originally described in 1822 by Elias Magnus Fries, as Peziza speciosa. Richard William George Dennis transferred it to the genus Cookeina in 1994.

The genus Cookeina is named after Mordecai Cubitt Cooke
