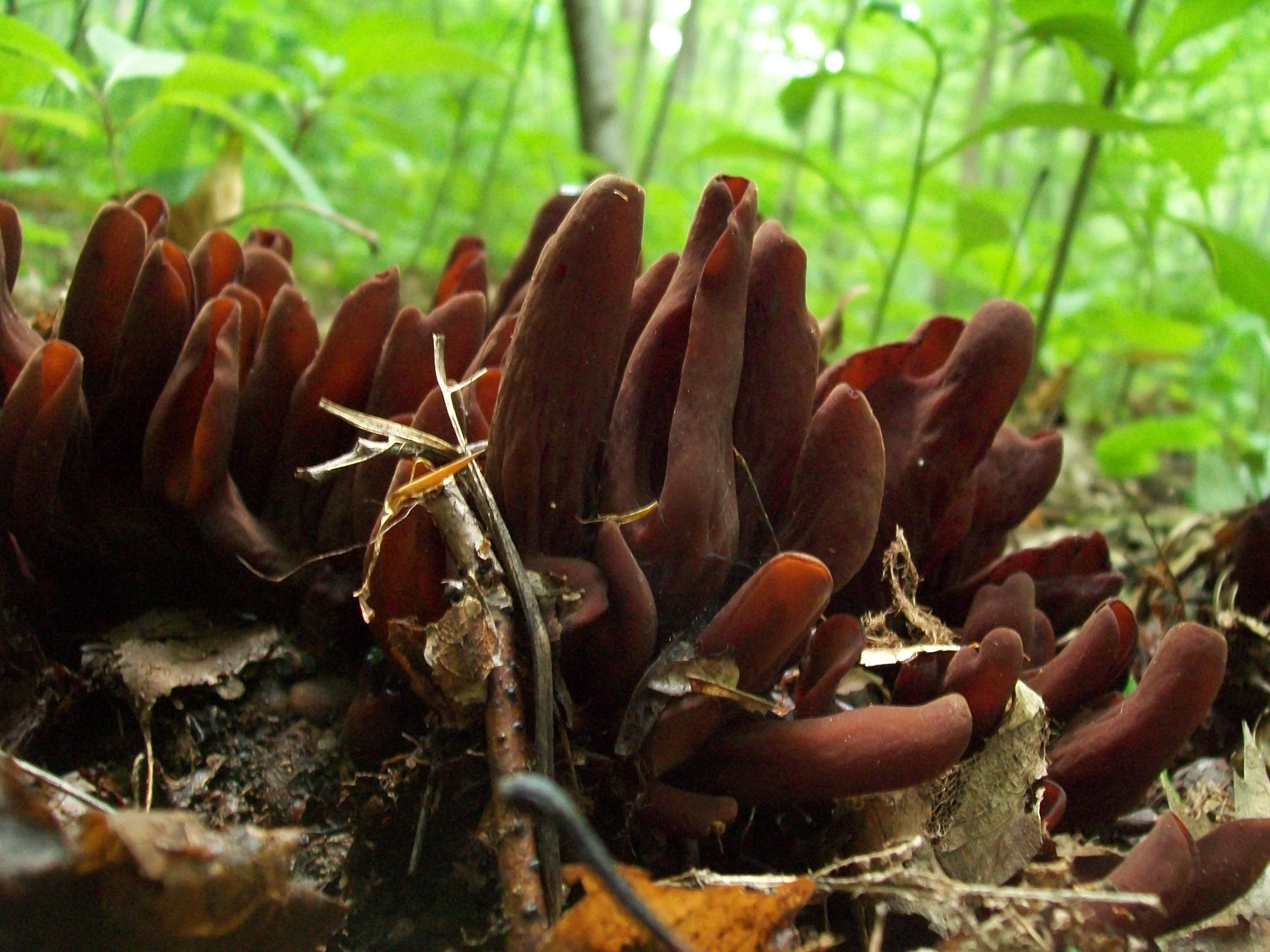

Scientific classification
- Kingdom: Fungi
- Division: Ascomycota
- Class: Pezizomycetes
- Order: Pezizales
- Family: Sarcoscyphaceae
- Genus: Wynnea
- Species: W. americana

Binomial name
- Wynnea americana Thaxt. (1905)

= Wynnea americana =

Species of fungus

Wynnea americana, commonly known as moose antlers or rabbit ears, is a species of fungus in the family Sarcoscyphaceae. The uncommon species is recognizable by its spoon-shaped or rabbit ear–shaped fruit bodies that may reach up to 13 cm (5 in) tall. It has dark brown and warty outer surfaces, while the fertile spore-bearing inner surface is orange to pinkish to reddish brown. It is distinguished from other species in its genus by the pustules (small bumps) on the outer surface, and microscopically by the large asymmetrical longitudinally ribbed spores with a sharply pointed tip. The spores are made in structures called asci, which have thickened rings at one end that are capped by a hinged structure known as the operculum—a lid that opens to release spores from the ascus.

In eastern North America, where it is typically found growing in the soil underneath hardwood trees, the inedible species is found from New York to Michigan south to Mexico. It has also been collected from Costa Rica, India, and Japan.

== Taxonomy ==
Wynnea americana was first described in 1905 by American mycologist Roland Thaxter. Thaxter found several clusters of fruit bodies in Burbank, Tennessee in 1888, and believed the fungus to be Wynnea macrotis, one of the first identified species of genus Wynnea. An 1896 visit to the same location as well as Cranberry, North Carolina yielded further specimens. This time, however, Thaxter noticed that the fruit bodies were not attached to humus, as expected, but rather to "a large, irregularly lobed, brown, firm, tuber-like body buried a few inches deep in the humus." Microscopic examination of this structure and other tissue of the fruit body convinced Thaxter the material was sufficiently different from known Wynnea species to justify the creation of a new species. Both the Tennessee and the North Carolina specimens were used as syntypes to describe the taxon; the Tennessee specimen has since been designated the lectotype (the name-bearing type specimen). In 1946, French mycologist Marcelle Louise Fernande Le Gal determined that the ascus in W. americana was similar in structure to those species he placed in the suboperculate series.

The common names for W. americana are "moose antlers", or "rabbit ears".

== Description ==
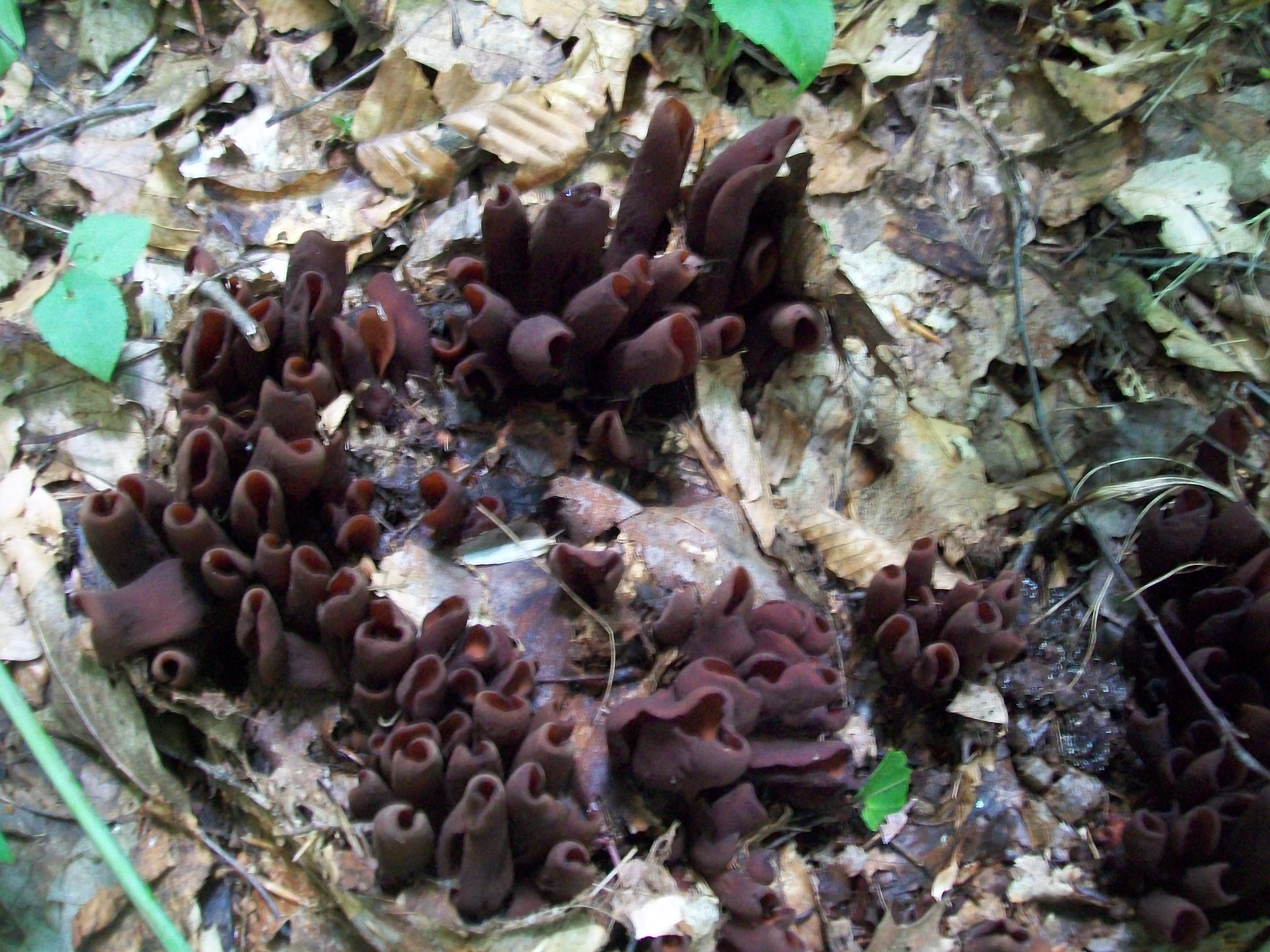
Young fruit bodies in West Virginia, United States

The fruit bodies (technically called apothecia) of W. americana are erect and spoon- or ear-shaped, and may reach up to 13 centimetres (5 inches) tall by 6 cm (2 1/4 in) wide with the edges usually rolled inward. The outside surface is dark brown–purplish, while the inner surface—the spore-bearing hymenium—is pinkish orange to dull purplish red or brown at maturity. The outer surface may develop wrinkles in maturity. The apothecia, which occur singly or in groups of up to about 25, arise from a short stalk. The stalk is variable in length and solid, dark outside, white within. The stalks originate from a sclerotium, a compact mass of hardened mycelium. The sclerotium has an almost gelatinous consistency with irregularly shaped lobes and internal chambers, and may reach a diameter of 4 to 6 cm (1 1/2 to 2 1/4 in). The sclerotium's function is thought to supply moisture and nutrients, or to serve as a resistant structure capable of sustaining the fungus through times of stress. W. macrotis is the only other species in the genus to bear a sclerotium.

Wynnea americana has no discernible odor, and its taste is unknown. It has been described as inedible due to its toughness.

Clusters of fruit bodies are connected by large underground masses of compacted mycelia known as sclerotia. Armillaria mycelium is commonly found in the underground tissue, though it is unclear if there is a parasitic relationship.

=== Microscopic characteristics ===
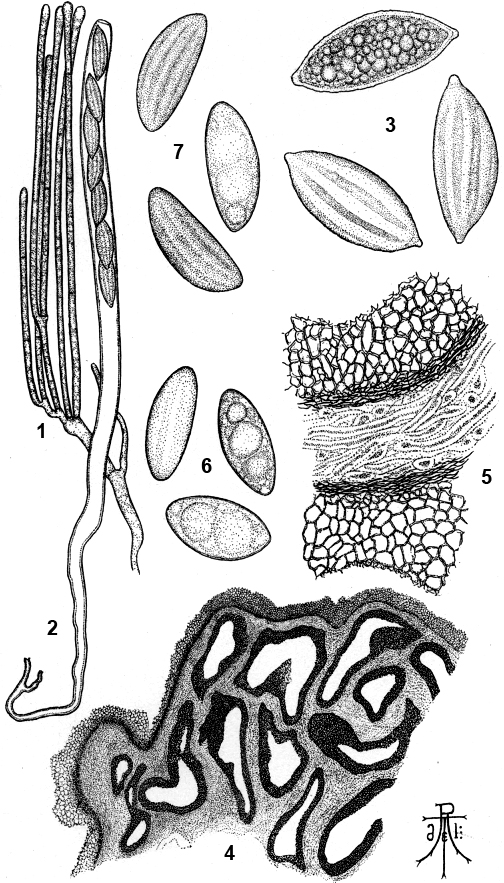
Microscopic features of W. americana. Figures 3, 6 and 7 are the spores of: (3) W. americana, (6) W. macrotis and (7) W. gigantea.

With many cup fungi, microscopic analysis of the anatomy and structure of the apothecium is necessary for accurate identification of species, or to help distinguish between related species that have a similar external appearance. In W. americana, the ectal excipulum (the outer layer of tissue comprising the apothecia) is 125 μm thick, and composed of dark angular to roughly spherical cells that are 40–70 μm in diameter. The angular cells form pyramidal warts on the outer surface. The medullary excipulum (the inner fleshy layer of tissue underneath the ectal excipulum) is almost gelatinous, composed of interwoven hyphae 10 μm in diameter.

Several structural components are involved in spore discharge in W. americana, such as the ascus, the operculum, the suboperculum. The spore-bearing cells, the asci, are 330–400 μm long by 16–20 μm wide. The ascus has a thickened apical ring that is capped by a hinged operculum, a lid that is opened when spores are to be released from the ascus. The presence of the apical ring beneath the operculum and the slanted opening that results is a condition known as "suboperculate", and is shared with Cookeina tricholoma and Phillipsia domingensis, also in the family Sarcoscyphaceae.

The spores are scaphoid (boat-shaped), and have dimensions of 35–38 by 12–14 μm. They are marked with prominent longitudinal grooves, and when mature, are apiculate (ending abruptly in a short point). The spores typically contain several oil droplets. The paraphyses (sterile cells interspersed among the asci) are 8–9 μm long and have internal partitions called septa. The structure of the septa has been investigated using transmission electron microscopy, which has revealed that W. americana has a single pore plugged by a "fan-shaped matrix"—an electron-dense region with a torus-shaped ring of translucent tissue wrapped around it. The pore plug resembles those found in the Sarcoscyphaceae species Sarcoscypha occidentalis and Phillipsia domingensis.

=== Similar species ===
The closely related Wynnea sparassoides, known in the vernacular as the "stalked cauliflower fungus", has a fruit body resembling a yellow-brown cauliflower atop a long brown stem. In comparison to W. americana, W. gigantea has apothecia that are smaller, more rounded at the tips, more numerous in a single specimen, and paler in color. Donald H. Pfister, in his 1979 monograph on the genus Wynnea, suggests that the pustulate appearance of the outer surface clearly distinguishes W. americana from the other species in the genus.

It also may resemble the purplish-brown and relatively stout Otidea smithii, as well as Mitodis lingua, the inside of which is darker than the outside; neither of these are connected to dense below-ground tissue.

== Distribution and habitat ==
In North America, W. americana has been collected from several locations, including Tennessee, New York, West Virginia, North Carolina, Ohio, and Pennsylvania. It has also been collected in Mexico, Costa Rica, India, and Japan.

The fruit bodies grow solitarily or in clusters on the ground in deciduous forests, and prefer moist, organic soils. In both Asia and North America, fruit bodies are most often produced during August and September. The single Central American collection, from Costa Rica, was made in early November.
