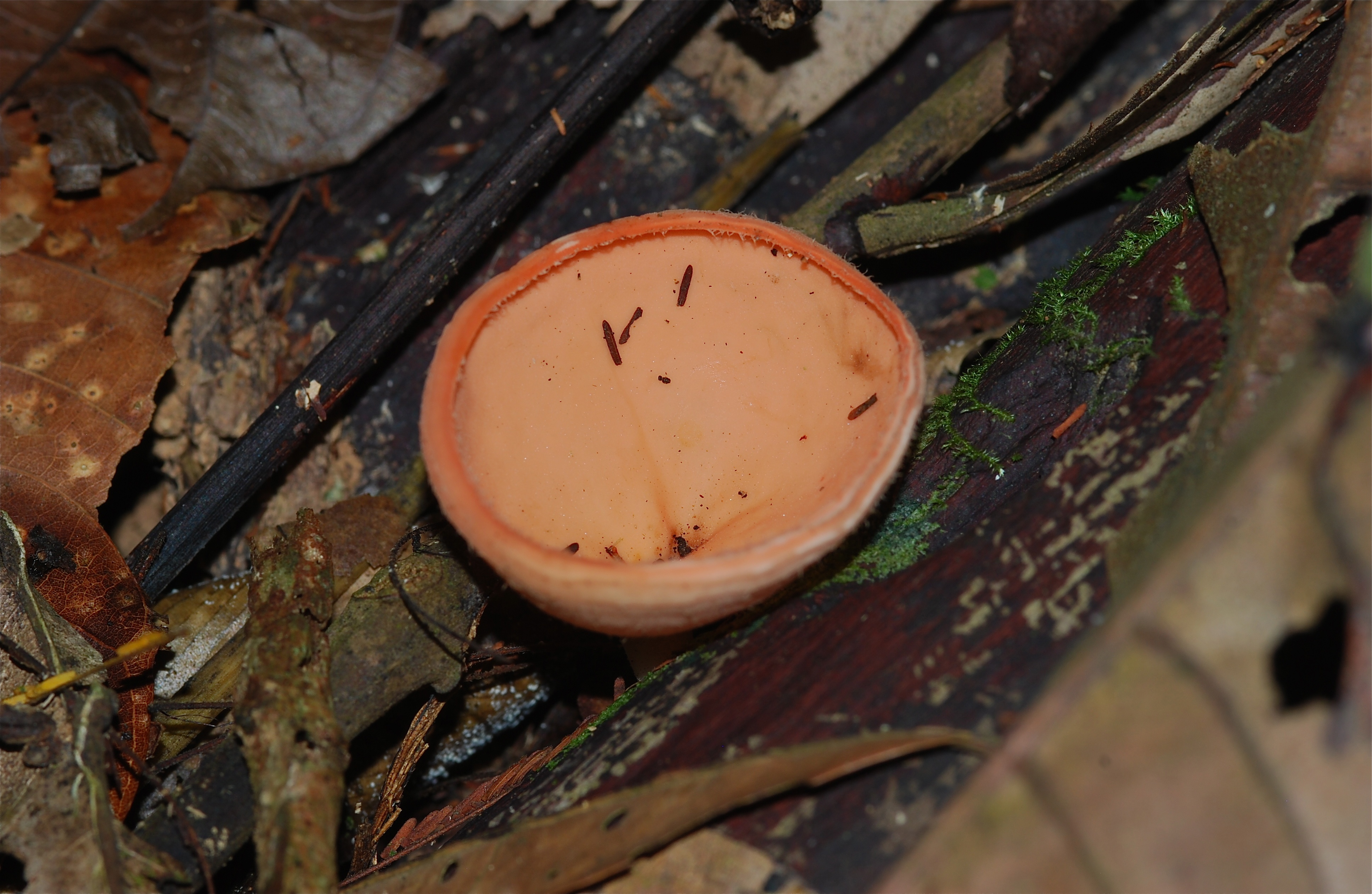

Scientific classification
- Kingdom: Fungi
- Division: Ascomycota
- Class: Pezizomycetes
- Order: Pezizales
- Family: Sarcoscyphaceae
- Genus: Cookeina
- Species: C. sulcipes

Binomial name
- Cookeina sulcipes (Berk.) Kuntze (1891)

Synonyms
- Peziza sulcipes Berk. (1842); Trichoscypha sulcipes (Berk.) Cooke (1889); Pilocratera sulcipes (Berk.) Sacc. & Traverso (1911); Cookeina sulcipes var. fusca Alas. (1973)

= Cookeina sulcipes =

Species of fungus

Cookeina sulcipes is a species of cup fungus in the family Sarcoscyphaceae. First described in 1842 by Miles Joseph Berkeley as a species of Peziza, it was transferred to the genus Cookeina by Otto Kuntze in 1891.
