= P. lutea =

P. lutea may refer to:

- Pachycondyla lutea, a ponerine ant
- Pachystachys lutea, an evergreen shrub
- Paederota lutea, a dicotyledonous plant
- Paeonia lutea, a plant with large flowers
- Parkia lutea, a plant with small-petaled flowers
- Partula lutea, an extinct snail
- Passiflora lutea, a plant native to North America
- Patella lutea, a true limpet
- Pedois lutea, a concealer moth
- Pelidnota lutea, a scarab beetle
- Penthophera lutea, an owlet moth
- Phacelia lutea, a New World plant
- Phaeosia lutea, a North American moth
- Phillipsia lutea, an apothecial fungus
- Phlebotomus lutea, a sand fly
- Pimpinella lutea, a flowering plant
- Pinguicula lutea, a carnivorous plant
- Piranga lutea, an American songbird
- Placea lutea, a plant endemic to Chile
- Plumeria lutea, a deciduous plant
- Polygala lutea, a flowering plant
- Porites lutea, a stony coral
- Portulaca lutea, a moss rose
- Primula lutea, a southeastern European primrose
- Primulina lutea, an African violet
- Proboscidea lutea, a plant native to South America
- Prosotas lutea, an Asian butterfly
- Protogautieria lutea, a basidiomycete fungus
- Pseudocoremia lutea, a geometer moth
- Pseudofumaria lutea, a perennial plant
- Pseudohalonectria lutea, a sac fungus
- Pseudomonas lutea, a rod-shaped bacterium
- Pseudopoda lutea, a huntsman spider
- Psychotria lutea, a flowering plant
- Pyura lutea, a sessile ascidian
