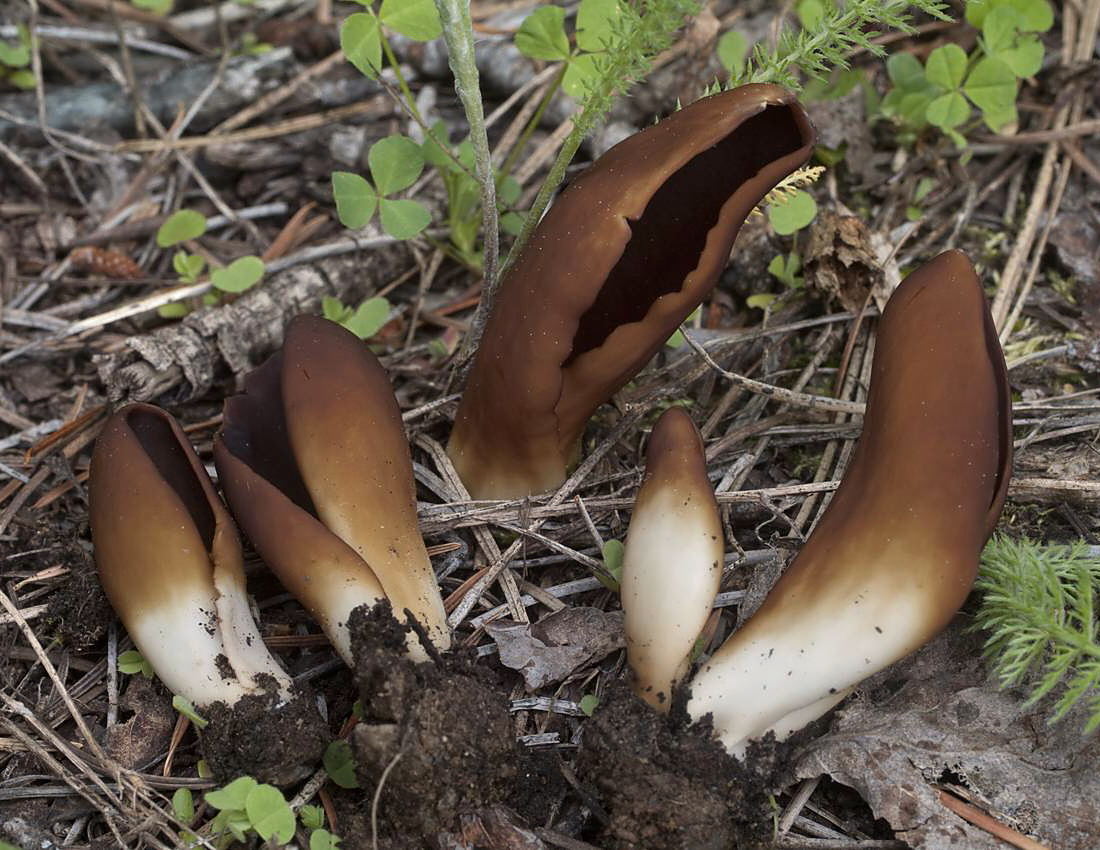
- Wynnella silvicola

Scientific classification
- Kingdom: Fungi
- Division: Ascomycota
- Class: Pezizomycetes
- Order: Pezizales
- Family: Helvellaceae
- Genus: Wynnella; Boud. (1885)

Type species
- Wynnella auricula (Schaeff.) Boud. (1885)

Species
- Wynnella auricula Wynnella silvicola Wynnella subalpina

Synonyms
- Midotis Fr. (1825)

= Wynnella =

Genus of fungi

Wynnella is a genus of ascomycete fungi of the family Helvellaceae. It contains three species, the type, W. auricula, W. silvicola and W. subalpina. The genus was circumscribed by French mycologist Jean Louis Émile Boudier in 1885. Wynnella is a sister genus to Helvella.

The genus name derives from the previously characterised genus Wynnea, named after Mary Lloyd Wynne.
