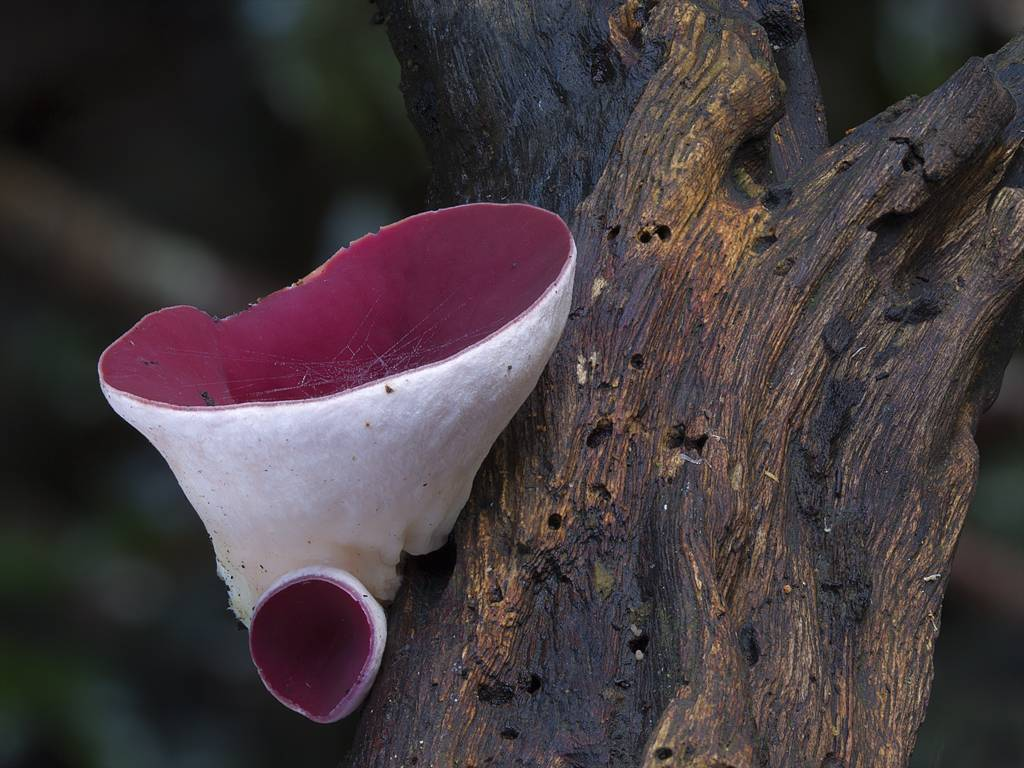

Scientific classification
- Kingdom: Fungi
- Division: Ascomycota
- Class: Pezizomycetes
- Order: Pezizales
- Family: Sarcoscyphaceae
- Genus: Phillipsia
- Species: P. subpurpurea

Binomial name
- Phillipsia subpurpurea Berk. & Broome (1881)

= Phillipsia subpurpurea =

Species of fungus

Phillipsia subpurpurea is a species of fungus in the family Sarcoscyphaceae. It is found in Australia where it grows as a saprophyte on wood. The fungus was first described scientifically by English mycologists Miles Joseph Berkeley and Christopher Edmund Broome. Its cup-shaped fruit bodies lack stipes and have purplish interior surfaces.
