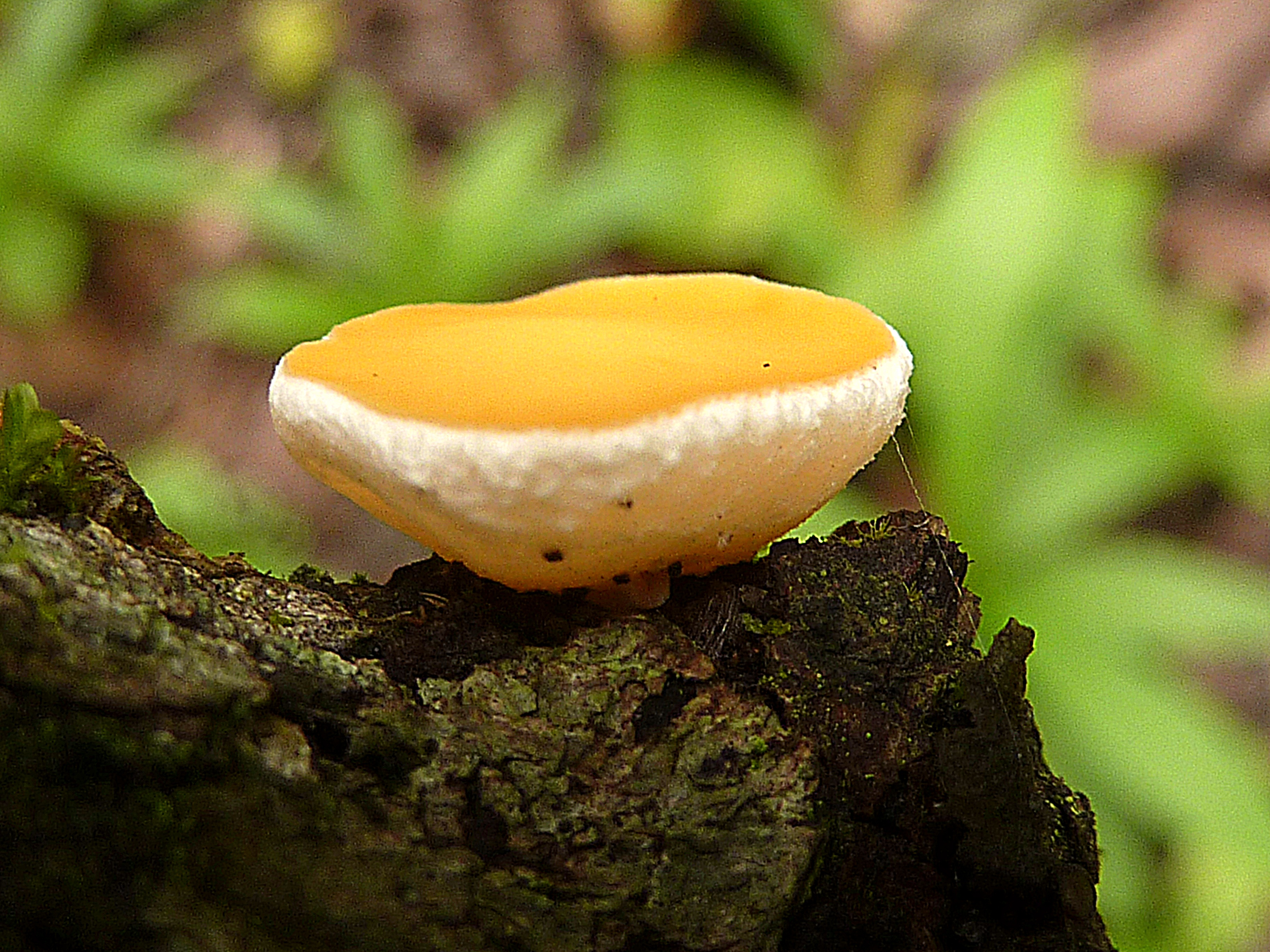

Scientific classification
- Domain: Eukaryota
- Kingdom: Fungi
- Division: Ascomycota
- Class: Pezizomycetes
- Order: Pezizales
- Family: Sarcoscyphaceae
- Genus: Phillipsia
- Species: P. lutea

Binomial name
- Phillipsia lutea Denison (1969)

Synonyms
- Molliardiomyces luteus Paden (1984)

= Phillipsia lutea =

Species of fungus

Phillipsia lutea is a species of fungus in the family Sarcoscyphaceae. It was originally described in 1969 by William Clark Denison from collections made in Costa Rica.
