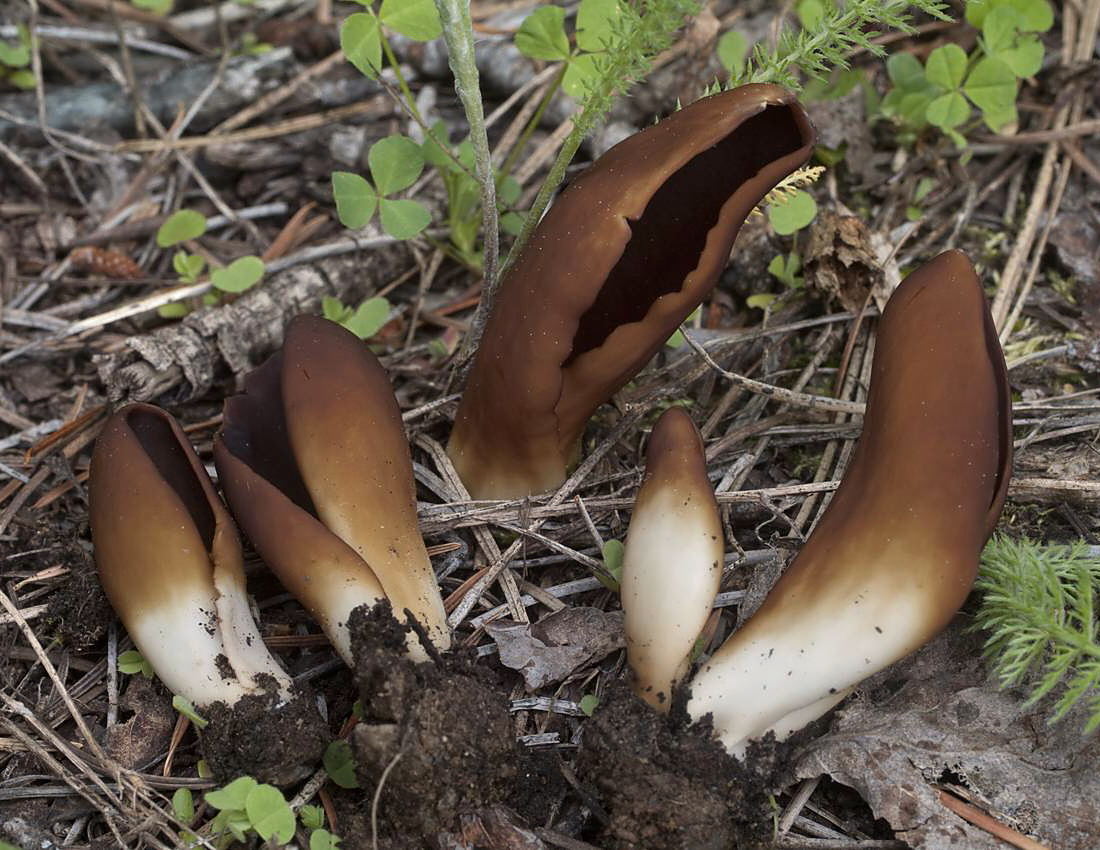

Scientific classification
- Kingdom: Fungi
- Division: Ascomycota
- Class: Pezizomycetes
- Order: Pezizales
- Family: Helvellaceae
- Genus: Wynnella
- Species: W. silvicola

Binomial name
- Wynnella silvicola (Beck) Nannf. (1966)

Synonyms
- Peziza cochleata Huds. (1778); Peziza atrofusca Beck (1884); Otidea silvicola Beck (1889); Otidea atrofusca Beck ex Rehm (1894); Otidea neglecta Massee (1894); Wynnea atrofusca R.Heim (1926); Wynnella atrofusca Svrček (1963); Helvella silvicola (Beck) Harmaja (1974)

= Wynnella silvicola =

Species of fungus

Wynnella silvicola is a species of fungus in the family Helvellaceae, order Pezizales. It was described by Günther Beck von Mannagetta und Lerchenau in 1884. The fungus forms distinctive upright fruit bodies 5–10 centimetres high, with a deep blood-red to purple-brown spore-bearing surface contrasting with a smooth outer surface that is reddish brown above and pale yellow at the base. It grows in coniferous and occasionally oak woodlands on calcareous soils across Europe and North America, with only a single confirmed record in Britain from an early 20th-century collection at Roslin, Scotland.

== Taxonomy ==
Wynnella silvicola was first described by Günther Beck von Mannagetta und Lerchenau in 1884 as Peziza atrofusca, but this name proved to be a later homonym and was replaced by Otidea silvicola Beck. In 1907 Boudier established the genus Wynnella for this ear‑shaped fungus, although some authors subsequently merged it with Helvella. Modern morphological and molecular studies place Wynnella firmly within the family Helvellaceae, closely allied to but distinct from Helvella. As a result, the correct name is Wynnella silvicola (Beck) Nannf.

== Description ==
The fruit bodies, or apothecia, stand upright and are ear‑shaped, typically 5–10 cm high. The spore‑bearing surface (hymenium) is a deep blood‑red to purple‑brown, contrasting with a smooth outer surface that is reddish brown above and pale yellow at the base; when dry, the flesh hardens and the colours deepen uniformly. Microscopically, the spores are broadly ellipsoid and smooth, measuring 21.5–24.0 by 12.5–16.5 μm, each containing a single large oil drop (guttule) and occasionally smaller droplets. The asci (spore‑bearing cells) are cylindrical, 350–380 by 16–22 μm, and the sterile filaments between them (paraphyses) are slender, straight and have yellowish inclusions when mounted in water.

== Habitat and distribution ==
In Britain, W. silvicola is known only from a single early 20th‑century collection at Roslin, Scotland (Royal Botanic Gardens, Kew). Elsewhere in Europe it occurs in subalpine coniferous woods on calcareous soils (Austria, Sweden, Norway) and in North America it is found on forest‑floor debris (plant litter) under conifers, sometimes in post‑fire habitats. A solitary Swedish record from beneath oak suggests it may tolerate a range of woodland habitats. Its scarcity in herbaria makes this an elusive species.
