= Nanoscypha =

Scientific classification
- Kingdom: Fungi
- Division: Ascomycota
- Class: Pezizomycetes
- Order: Pezizales
- Family: Sarcoscyphaceae
- Genus: Nanoscypha; Denison (1972)

Type species
- Nanoscypha tetraspora (Seaver) Denison (1972)

Species
- N. bella N. denisonii N. euspora N. macrospora N. orissaensis N. pulchra N. striatispora N. tetraspora N. waterstonii

Genus of fungi

Nanoscypha is a genus of fungi in the family Sarcoscyphaceae. There are about 10 species in the genus, which have a widespread distribution.
