= Wynnella auricula =

Scientific classification
- Kingdom: Fungi
- Division: Ascomycota
- Class: Pezizomycetes
- Order: Pezizales
- Family: Helvellaceae
- Genus: Wynnella
- Species: W. auricula

Binomial name
- Wynnella auricula (Schaeff.) Boud. (1885)

Synonyms
- Peziza auricula Schaeff. (1763); Otidea auricula (Schaeff.) Sacc. (1889)

Species of fungus

Wynnella auricula is a species of fungus in the family Helvellaceae, and the type species of genus Wynnella. It was first described in 1763 by German mycologist Jacob Christian Schäffer as Peziza auricula. Jean Louis Émile Boudier transferred it to Wynnella in 1885.
