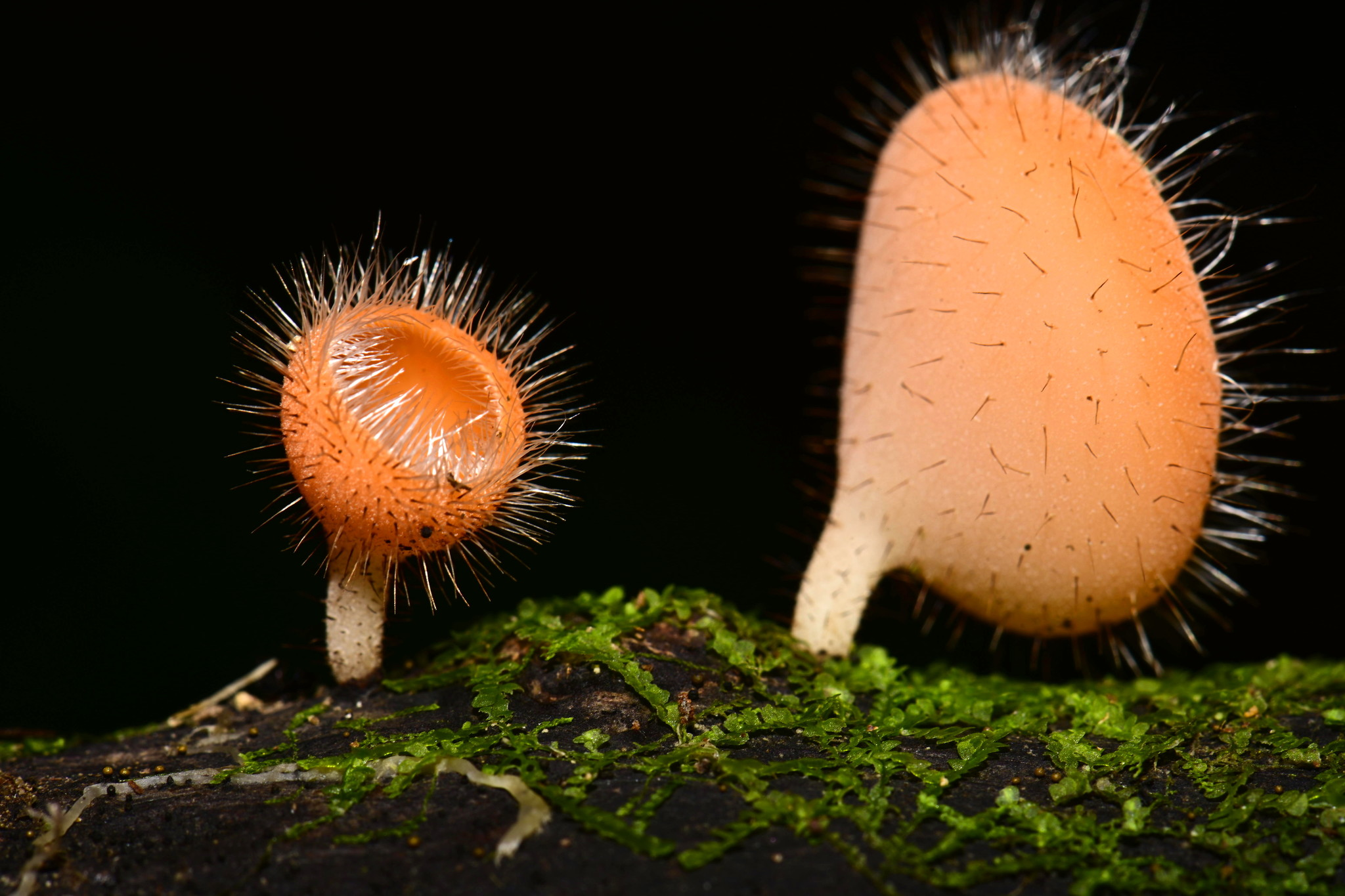

Scientific classification
- Domain: Eukaryota
- Kingdom: Fungi
- Division: Ascomycota
- Class: Pezizomycetes
- Order: Pezizales
- Family: Sarcoscyphaceae
- Genus: Cookeina
- Species: C. tricholoma

Binomial name
- Cookeina tricholoma (Mont.) Kuntze (1891)

Synonyms
- Peziza tricholoma Mont. (1834)

= Cookeina tricholoma =

Species of fungus

Cookeina tricholoma, also known by its common name bristly tropical cup, is a species of fungus from the genus Cookeina.
