= Aurophora =

Scientific classification
- Kingdom: Fungi
- Division: Ascomycota
- Class: Pezizomycetes
- Order: Pezizales
- Family: Sarcoscyphaceae
- Genus: Aurophora; Rifai

Type species
- Aurophora dochmia (Berk. & M.A. Curtis) Rifai

Genus of fungi

Aurophora is a genus of fungi in the family Sarcoscyphaceae. This is a monotypic genus, containing the single species Aurophora dochmia, which has a widespread distribution in pantropical areas.
