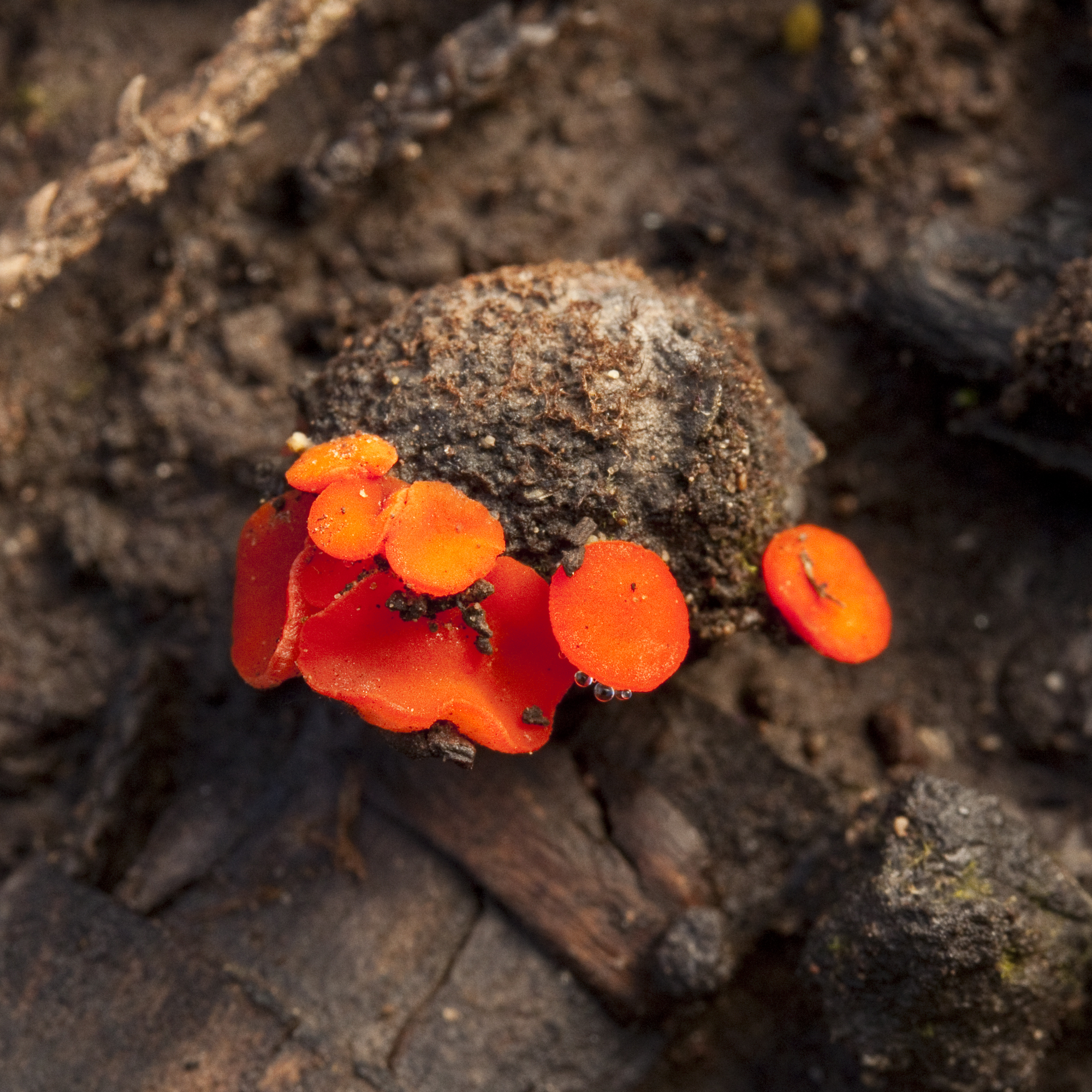
- Pseudopithyella minuscula

Scientific classification
- Kingdom: Fungi
- Division: Ascomycota
- Class: Pezizomycetes
- Order: Pezizales
- Family: Sarcoscyphaceae
- Genus: Pseudopithyella; Seaver (1928)

Type species
- Pseudopithyella minuscula (Boud. & Torrend) Seaver (1928)

Species
- P. magnispora P. minuscula

= Pseudopithyella =

Genus of fungi

Pseudopithyella is a genus of fungi in the family Sarcoscyphaceae. There are two species in the genus, which have a widespread distribution. Pseudopithyella was circumscribed by Fred Jay Seaver in 1928.
