= Thindia =

Scientific classification
- Kingdom: Fungi
- Division: Ascomycota
- Class: Pezizomycetes
- Order: Pezizales
- Family: Sarcoscyphaceae
- Genus: Thindia; Korf & Waraitch

Type species
- Thindia cupressi Korf & Waraitch

Genus of fungi

Thindia is a genus of fungi in the family Sarcoscyphaceae. This is a monotypic genus, containing the single species Thindia cupressi, found in Uttar Pradesh, India.
