= Ebenezer Cooke (art education reformer) =

British pioneer in art education (1837–1913)

Ebenezer Cooke (1837 – 1913) was an art master and pioneer in art education.

An apprenticed lithographic draughtsman, he was introduced by his brother Mordecai to the lectures of Frederick Denison Maurice at the Hall of Association, 34 Castle Street East, London, in 1853 and the summer of 1854. When the Working Men's College was formed in 1854, he attended John Ruskin’s first drawing classes. After an unsuccessful partnership with John Fotheringham, also a student at the college, he gave up his trade and then took to teaching through the influence of Ruskin. He succeeded Ruskin as a drawing master at the college, and taught at other London establishments.

During the 1850s and 1860s Cooke was influenced by Herbert Spencer, and became a student of Pestalozzi, developing an enthusiasm for the Pestalozzian and Froebellian methods in which he became an influential interpreter. With Thomas Ablett, Alexander Bain, and psychologist James Sully, he furthered art education thinking; Sully and Cooke were a particular influence on each other.

He served on the Council of the Education Society (founded 1875) which later became the Society for the Development of the Science of Education. In 1885 Cooke published an analysis of children's drawings that became a great influence on teachers and researchers, and in 1894 published an English edition of Pestalozzi's How Gertrude Teaches Her Children. In 1904 he sat on the Committee of the Third International Congress for the Development of Drawing and Art Teaching.

Vanessa Bell began her art education under the tutelage of Cooke.

Cooke was a younger brother of the botanist and mycologist Mordecai Cubitt Cooke (1825 - 1914) and helped illustrate a number of his publications.

University College London holds Cooke's papers, which mainly relate to his teaching career but also include drawings.
