= Kompsoscypha =

Scientific classification
- Kingdom: Fungi
- Division: Ascomycota
- Class: Pezizomycetes
- Order: Pezizales
- Family: Sarcoscyphaceae
- Genus: Kompsoscypha; Pfister

Type species
- Kompsoscypha chudei (Pat. ex Le Gal) Pfister

Species
- K. chudei K. phyllogena K. waterstonii K. ziziphi

Genus of fungi

Kompsoscypha is a genus of fungi in the family Sarcoscyphaceae. There are four species in the genus, which have a widespread distribution in tropical regions.
