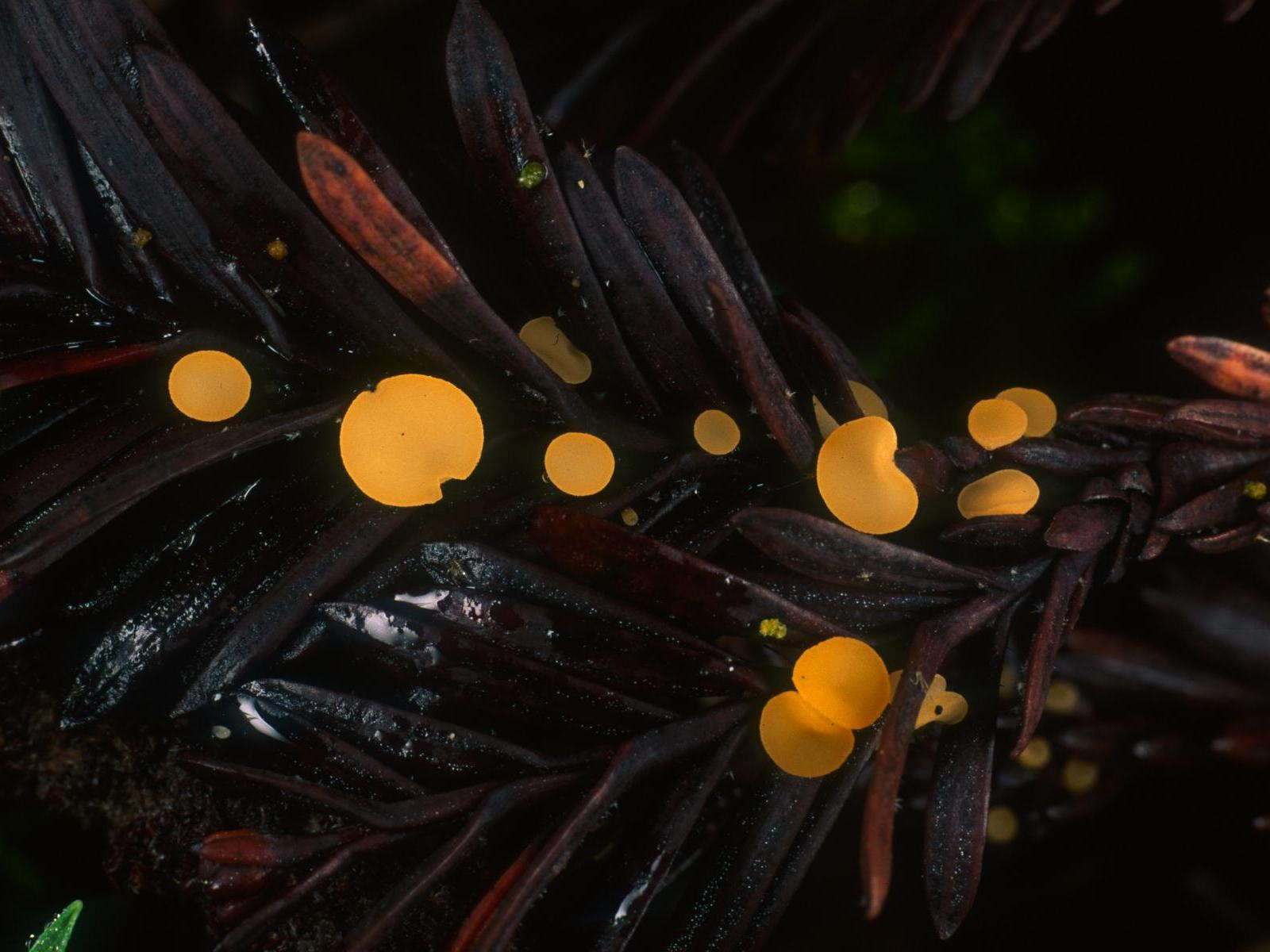
- Cup fungus of the genus Pithya (not identified to species)

Scientific classification
- Kingdom: Fungi
- Division: Ascomycota
- Class: Pezizomycetes
- Order: Pezizales
- Family: Sarcoscyphaceae
- Genus: Pithya; Fuckel

Type species
- Pithya cupressina Fuckel

= Pithya =

Genus of fungi

Pithya is a genus of fungi in the family Sarcoscyphaceae. There are five species in the genus, which are widespread in northern temperate areas.
