= Leucocoprinus wynneae =

Scientific classification
- Kingdom: Fungi
- Division: Basidiomycota
- Class: Agaricomycetes
- Order: Agaricales
- Family: Agaricaceae
- Genus: Leucocoprinus
- Species: L. wynneae

Binomial name
- Leucocoprinus wynneae (Berk & Broome) Locq. (1943)

Synonyms
- Hiatula wynneae Berk & Broome (1879)

Species of fungus

Leucocoprinus wynneae is a species of mushroom producing fungus in the family Agaricaceae.

== Taxonomy ==
It was first described in 1879 by the British mycologists Miles Joseph Berkeley and Christopher Edmund Broome who classified it as Hiatula wynneae or (wynniae).

In 1943 it was reclassified as Leucocoprinus wynneae (or wynniae) by the French mycologist Marcel Locquin.

== Description ==
Leucocoprinus wynneae is a small, white dapperling mushroom. Berkeley and Broome provided only a very basic description of this species in 1879 which is not enough to adequately distinguish it from other species.

Cap: 3.2cm wide. White with a soft, powdery cap with a darker centre. Stem: 2.5cm tall and 1.5mm thick. Slender and striated.

== Etymology ==
The specific epithet wynneae is named for Mary Lloyd Wynne who found the specimen examined by Berkeley and Broome.

== Habitat and distribution ==
L. wynneae is scarcely recorded and little known. It was first found in a hothouse at Kew Gardens by Lloyd Wynne. It has not been recorded there since but has been observed in the wild in Queensland, Australia and Sri Lanka. However the Atlas of Living Australia only has a single record of L. wynneae from 1887.
