= Mordecai Cubitt Cooke =

English mycologist and botanist (1825–1914)

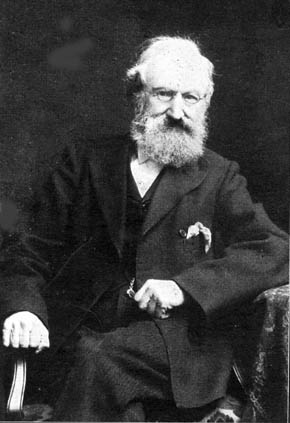
- Mordecai Cubitt Cooke c.1905
- Born: 12 July 1825; Horning, Norfolk, England
- Died: 12 November 1914 (aged 89); Southsea, Hampshire, England
- Resting place: Islington Cemetery
- Known for: Founder of the Quekett Microscopical Club
- Spouse: Sophia Elizabeth Biggs (m. 1846; died 1897)
- Partner: Annie Elizabeth Thornton Biggs (m. 1860; sep. 1890)
- Children: 9, including painter William Cubitt Cooke
- Parents: Mordecai Cooke (father); Mary (née Cubitt) (mother)
- Relatives: Ebenezer Cooke (brother)
- Awards: Victoria Medal of Honour (1902); Linnean Medal (1903)
- Scientific career
- Fields: Botany and mycology
- Workplaces: Holy Trinity National School
- Author abbrev. (botany): Cooke

Mordecai Cubitt Cooke (12 July 1825 – 12 November 1914) was an English mycologist and botanist who was, at various points, a London schoolteacher, a Kew mycologist, curator at the India Museum, journalist and author. Cooke was the elder brother of the art-education reformer Ebenezer Cooke (1837–1913) and father of the book illustrator and watercolour painter William Cubitt Cooke (1866–1951).

== Early life and education ==
Mordecai Cubitt Cooke was born on 12 July 1825 at the village shop and post office in Horning, Norfolk to Mary (née Cubitt) (1803–1885), postmistress and village herbalist, and Mordecai Cooke (1799–1869), village shopkeeper. His maternal grandfather was William Cubitt, who was schoolmaster in Neatishead, Norfolk. Cooke was the eldest of eight children and initially attended the village dame-school.

Between the age of ten and thirteen he was taught by his uncle, James Cubitt, a Baptist minister, in Ilford then Stratford upon Avon. He then attended a commercial school at Neatishead for a year before taking up a five year apprenticeship with a wholesale draper in Norwich.

== Career ==
In 1844, Cooke moved to London to be a clerk in a law firm, but his chief interest was botany. His aunt Naomi Treen (née Cubitt), a teacher at a Pestalozzian primary school encouraged him to take up teaching. He taught natural history at Holy Trinity National School, Lambeth from 1851, where he set up a school museum and pioneered new natural history teaching methods. He wrote for School and the Teacher magazine and helped to found a museum for London teachers. In 1859 he earned a first class in botany in the first examination for teachers run by the Department of Science and Art. He left teaching after this, around the same time that his first child with his step daughter was born. He worked part time roles and published books before working as a curator at the India Museum at India Office from 1862 - 1880. He founded the Society of Amateur Botanists in 1862.

Hardwicke's science-gossip. Volume 4, 1868

In 1879, when the botanical materials in the India Museum were moved to the Royal Botanic Gardens, Kew, Cooke went with them. He received a Victoria Medal of Honour from the Royal Horticultural Society in 1902 and a Linnean Medal from the Linnean Society of London in 1903. He claimed to have gained several honorary diplomas for his work, mainly with fungi: MAs from St. Lawrence University in 1870 and Yale University in 1873, and a doctorate from New York University though these claims are disputed. Cooke's life and work are comprehensively documented in a biography by distant relative Mary P. English.

Cooke joined Edward Step (1855–1931) in publishing the magazine Hardwicke's Science-Gossip: A Monthly Medium of Interchange and Gossip for Students and Lovers of Nature from 1865 to 1893. From 1870 to 1890 he edited several exsiccatae and exsiccata-like works, one of them the series Fungi Britannici exsiccati a M. C. Cooke collecti, Series I starting with 1865 and another Fungi Americani exsiccati (1878-1882) with Henry William Ravenel.

From 1872 to 1894 Cooke also edited Grevillea, a monthly record of cryptogamic botany and its literature, a periodical devoted to mycology. He was a founder of the Quekett Microscopical Club in 1865, in response to a request in Science-Gossip, and a founding member of the British Mycological Society.

It has been suggested that Cooke's description of the perceived distortions of the size of objects while intoxicated by the fungus Amanita muscaria (commonly known as the fly agaric or fly amanita), in his books The Seven Sisters of Sleep and A Plain and Easy Account of British Fungi, inspired the passage in Lewis Carroll's 1865 popular children's storybook Alice's Adventures in Wonderland, where Alice grows or shrinks on eating parts of the mushroom. (The effects were later termed Alice in Wonderland syndrome.)

He is honoured in the naming of Cookeina, which is a genus of cup fungi in the family Sarcoscyphaceae, which was found in 1891.

== Personal life ==
Cooke married Sophia Elizabeth Biggs (1823–1897) on 4 January 1846. They had no children but Sophia's two-year-old illegitimate daughter, Annie Elizabeth Thornton Biggs (1844–1920) grew up in their household. Cooke fathered three sons and a daughter with his step daughter Annie, the first being born when she was only seventeen. In 1871 Annie married Cooke's step-second cousin, John Quincey Cubitt, but four years later had returned to Cooke, with her daughter by Cubitt. Two more sons and a daughter were born to Annie and Cooke, but she left him c.1890, taking with her daughter with Cubitt's and Cooke's two youngest sons with her. Cooke provided her with an allowance and she remained in touch with the family. Sophia remained with her husband throughout this period, living from 1870 at 146 Junction Road, Kentish Town and dying in 1897.

Cooke died on 12 November 1914 in Southsea, Hampshire, in his daughter's home. He was buried in Islington Cemetery with his wife, Sophia. His headstone is carved with a clump of toadstools. He left £813, 15s. 6d. in his will.

== Selected works ==
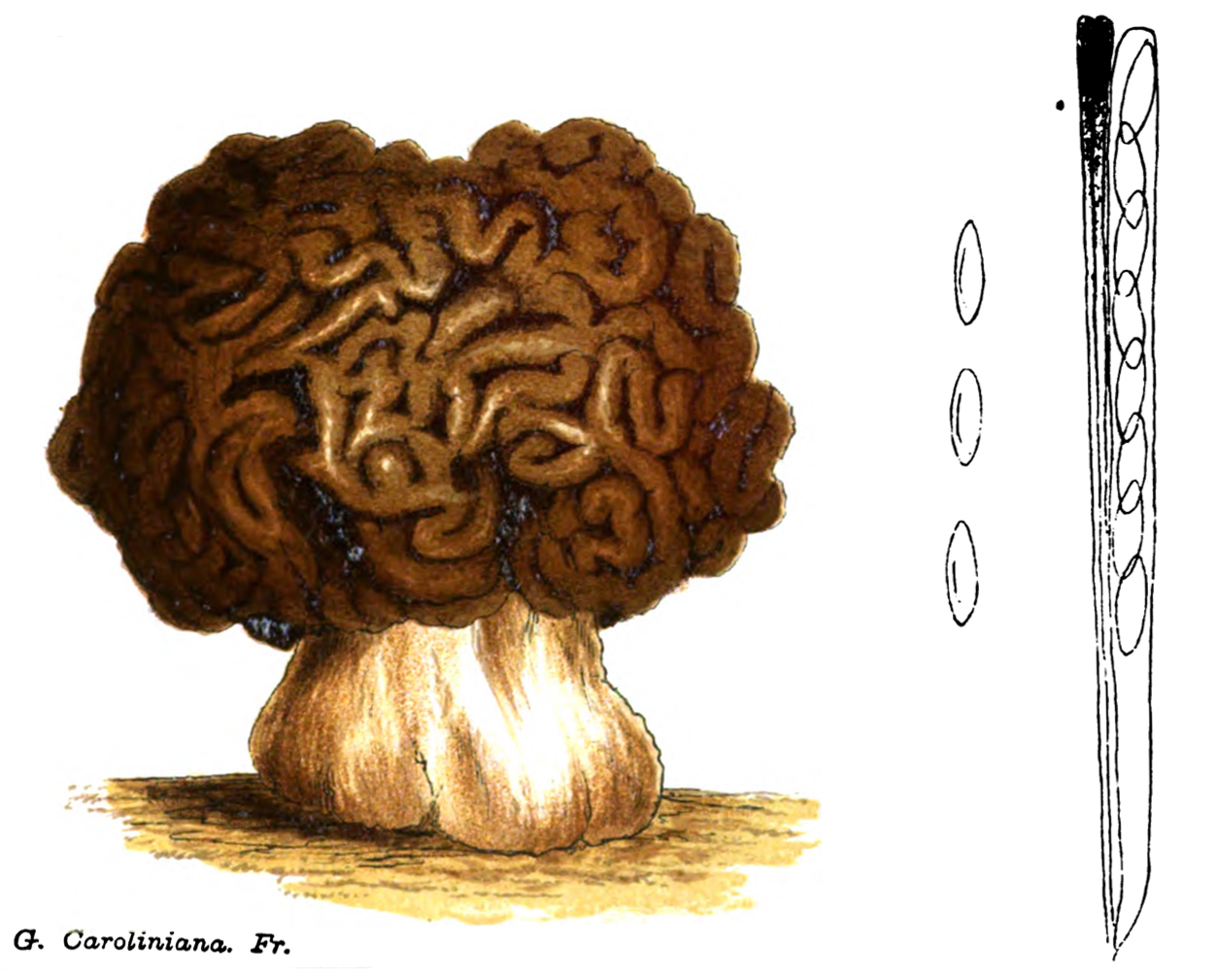
Gyromitra caroliniana From Cooke's (1825–1914) Mycographia, seu Icones fungorum: Figures of fungi from all parts of the world William and Norgate, 1879, figure 330, plate 90.

- The Seven Sisters of Sleep. Popular history of the seven prevailing narcotics of the world (James Blackwood, London, 1860), Gutenberg copy, 2019
- A Manual of Structural Botany: for the use of classes, schools, & private students... with upwards of 200 illustrations by Ruffle (Robert Hardwicke, London, 1861, new edition 1877)
- A Manual of Botanic Terms... with illustrations (Robert Hardwicke, London, 1862, new edition 1873)
- A Plain and Easy Account of British Fungi: with descriptions of the esculent and poisonous species... With twenty-four coloured plates (Robert Hardwicke, London, 1862, new editions 1866 and 1876, 5th edition 1884, 6th edition 1898)
- Index Fungorum Britannicorum. A complete list of fungi found in the British Islands to the present date, etc. (Robert Hardwicke, London, 1863)
- Our Reptiles. A plain and easy account of the lizards, snakes, newts, toads, frogs, and tortoises indigenous to Britain. With original figures of every species, and numerous woodcuts (Robert Hardwicke, London, 1865, new edition 1893, W. H. Allen & Co., London)
- Rust, smut, mildew, & mould. An introduction to the study of microscopic fungi (Robert Hardwicke, London, 1865, new edition 1870, new edition 1878, new edition 1886, Gutenberg copy 2020)
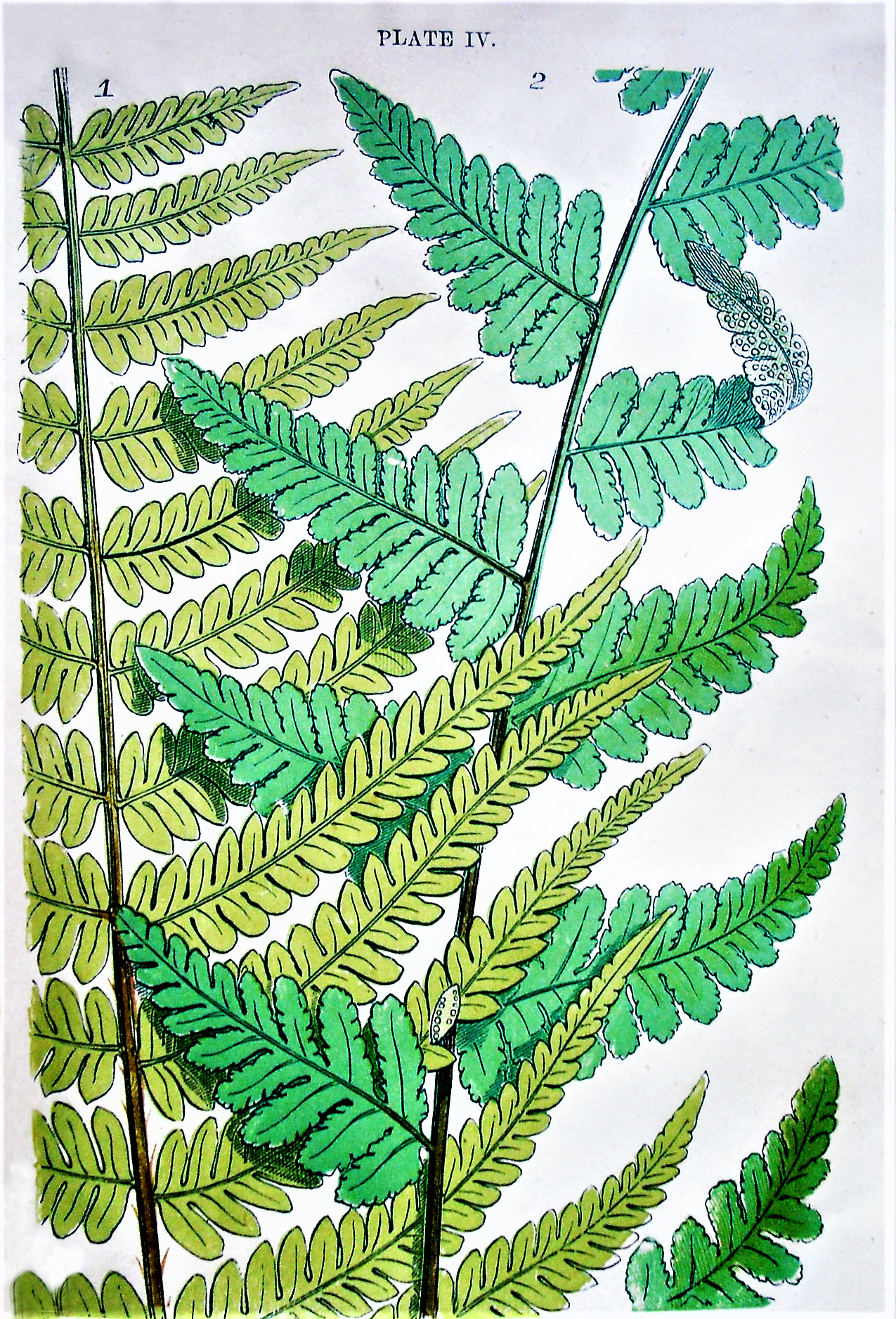
  An illustration from A Fern Book for Everybody. Containing all the British ferns. With the foreign species suitable for a fernery, Editura Frederick Warne and CO, London 1867, pl. IV
- A Fern Book for Everybody. Containing all the British ferns. With the foreign species suitable for a fernery (Robert Hardwicke, London, 1867)
- One Thousand Objects for the Microscope, etc. (Robert Hardwicke, London, 1869, new editions 1895 and 1900, Frederick Warne & Co., London/New York)
  One thousand objects for the microscope front cover
  *Handbook of British Fungi, with full descriptions of all the species and illustrations of the genera (2 vols, Macmillan & Co., London/New York, 1871, new edition 1883)
- Report on the Gums, Resins, Oleo-Resins, and Resinous Products in the India Museum, or produced in India. Prepared under the direction of the Reporter on the Products of India (London, 1874)
- Fungi: their nature, influence, and uses (London, 1875, 3rd edition 1883, 5th edition 1894, new edition 1920 K. Paul, Gutenberg copy 2012)
- Report on the Oil Seeds and Oils in the India Museum, or produced in India. Prepared under the direction of the Reporter on the Products of India (London, 1876)
- The Myxomycetes of Great Britain, translated from the Polish of J. T. Rostafinski (London, 1877)
- Clavis Synoptica Hymenomycetum Europaeorum, with L. Quelet (London, 1878)
- Fungi Americani exsiccati (exsiccata series) with Henry William Ravenel (1878–82)
- The Woodlands (Society for Promoting Christian Knowledge, London, 1879)
- Mycographia, seu Icones fungorum. Figures of fungi from all parts of the world, drawn and illustrated by M. C. Cooke (Williams & Norgate, London, 1875 and 1879)
- Ponds and Ditches (Society for Promoting Christian Knowledge, London, 1880)
- Freaks and Marvels of Plant Life; or, Curiosities of vegetation (Society for Promoting Christian Knowledge, London, 1881)
- Illustrations of British Fungi... To serve as an atlas to the "Handbook of British Fungi" (8 vols, Williams & Norgate, London, 1881–1891)
- British Fresh-Water Algae. Exclusive of Desmidieæ and Diatomaceæ, etc. (2 vols, Williams & Norgate, London, 1882–1884)
- Fungi Australianai, reprinted from Grevillea (Melbourne, 1883)
- British Desmids. A supplement to British Fresh-Water Algae, etc. (Williams & Norgate, London, 1887)
- Toilers in the Sea. A study of marine life (Society for Promoting Christian Knowledge, London, 1889)
- Introduction to Fresh-Water Algae with an enumeration of all the British species ... With thirteen plates, etc. (London, 1890)
- British Edible Fungi: how to distinguish and how to cook them, etc. (Kegan Paul, Trench, Trübner & Co., London, 1891)
- Handbook of Australian Fungi (London, 1892)
- Vegetable Wasps and Plant Worms. A popular history of entomogeneous fungi or fungi parasitic upon insects... with... illustrations (Society for Promoting Christian Knowledge, London, 1892)
- Romance of Low Life amongst Plants. Facts and phenomena of cryptogamic vegetation (Society for Promoting Christian Knowledge, London, 1893)
- Handbook of British Hepaticae, etc. (W. H. Allen & Co., London, 1894)
- Edible and Poisonous Mushrooms (Society for Promoting Christian Knowledge, London, 1894, re-edited 1902)
- Down the Lane and back, in search of wild flowers. By Uncle Matt (T. Nelson & Sons, London, 1895)
- Through the Copse. Another ramble after flowers with Uncle Matt (T. Nelson & Sons, London, 1895)
- Around a Cornfield, in a ramble after wild flowers. By Uncle Matt (T. Nelson & Sons, London, 1895)
- Across the Common, after wild flowers. By Uncle Matt (T. Nelson & Sons, London, 1895)
- A Stroll on a Marsh, in search of wild flowers. By Uncle Matt (T. Nelson & Sons, London, 1895)
- Introduction to the Study of Fungi: their organography, classification, and distribution. For the use of collectors (Adam & Charles Black, London, 1895)
- Object-Lesson Handbooks to accompany the Royal Portfolio of Pictures and Diagrams (T. Nelson & Sons, London, 1897–1898)
- Introduction to Fresh-Water Algae (K. Paul, London, 1902)
- Fungoid Pests of Cultivated Plants (Spottiswoode & Co., London, 1906)
- Catalogue and Field-Book of British Basidiomycetes up to and Inclusive of the Year 1908 (London, 1909)

== See also ==
- Category:Taxa named by Mordecai Cubitt Cooke
