= William Clark Denison =

American mycologist

William Clark Denison (June 1, 1928 – April 8, 2005) was an American mycologist. Born in Rochester, New York, Denison attended Oberlin College, from which he earned a B.A. degree in 1950, and a Master's degree in 1952. Under the supervision of Richard P. Korf, Denison completed a PhD from Cornell University in 1956 on the ascomycete genus Scutellinia. He accepted a position as associate professor in the department of botany and plant pathology at Oregon State University in 1966, simultaneously becoming curator of the mycological herbarium. He retired from Oregon State University in 1993. He was described as "a pioneer in the use of lichens to monitor air quality in the United States".

== Honors and awards ==
The fungus species Nanoscypha denisonii is named in his honor, as was the lichen Sinuicella denisonii.

== Taxa described ==
Genera:

- Geodina Denison (1965)
- Nanoscypha Denison (1972)
- Strobiloscypha N.S.Weber & Denison (1995)

Species:

- Scutellinia armatospora Denison (1961)
- Scutellinia verrucipolaris Denison (1961)
- Cheilymenia alleghenensis Denison (1964)
- Geodina guanacastensis Denison (1965)
- Phillipsia costaricensis Denison (1969)
- Nanoscypha macrospora Denison (1972)
- Nanoscypha pulchra Denison (1972)
- Strobiloscypha keliae N.S.Weber & Denison (1995)
