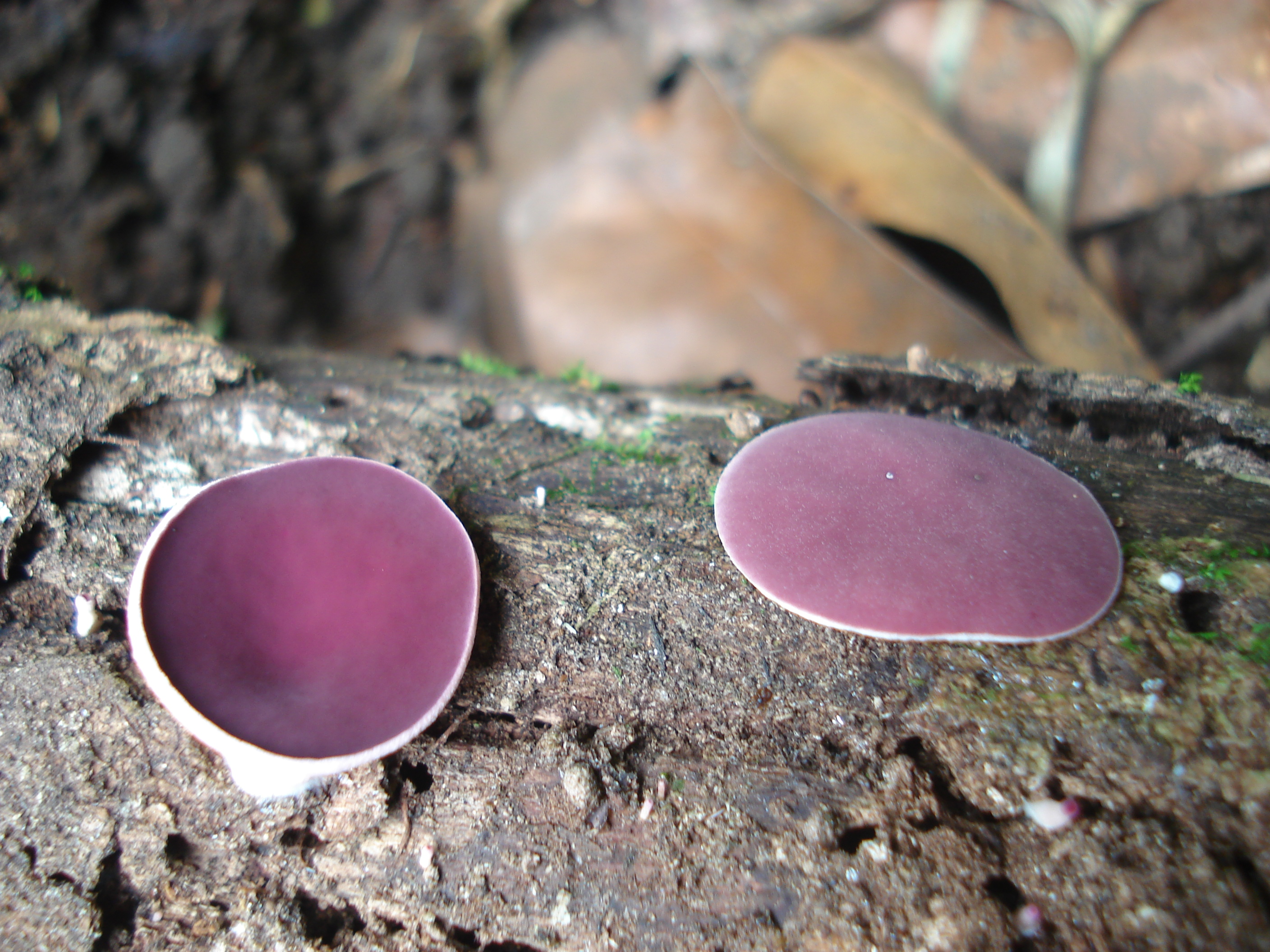
- Phillipsia domingensis

Scientific classification
- Kingdom: Fungi
- Division: Ascomycota
- Class: Pezizomycetes
- Order: Pezizales
- Family: Sarcoscyphaceae
- Genus: Phillipsia; Berk. (1881)

Type species
- Phillipsia domingensis Berk. (1881)

Synonyms
- Rickiella Syd. (1904)

= Phillipsia =

Genus of fungi

Phillipsia is a genus of fungi in the family Sarcoscyphaceae. There are about 17 species in the genus, which collectively have a widespread distribution in subtropical and tropical areas. The genus was circumscribed by Miles Joseph Berkeley in 1881. The generic name honours Wales-born English botanist William Phillips (1822–1905).

== Species ==
- Phillipsia carminea
- Phillipsia carnicolor
- Phillipsia chardoniana
- Phillipsia chinensis
- Phillipsia costaricensis
- Phillipsia crenulata
- Phillipsia crenulopsis
- Phillipsia crispata
- Phillipsia dochmia
- Phillipsia domingensis
- Phillipsia gigantea
- Phillipsia guatemalensis
- Phillipsia hartmannii
- Phillipsia kermesina
- Phillipsia lutea
- Phillipsia minor
- Phillipsia olivacea
- Phillipsia plicarioides
- Phillipsia polyporoides
- Phillipsia ranomafanensis
- Phillipsia rugospora
- Phillipsia straminea
- Phillipsia subpurpurea
- Phillipsia tetraspora
- Phillipsia umbilicata
