= Geodina =

Scientific classification
- Domain: Eukaryota
- Kingdom: Fungi
- Division: Ascomycota
- Class: Pezizomycetes
- Order: Pezizales
- Family: Sarcoscyphaceae
- Genus: Geodina; Denison (1965)

Type species
- Geodina guanacastensis Denison (1965)

Genus of fungi

Geodina is a genus of fungi in the family Sarcoscyphaceae. This genus contains two species: Geodina guanacastensis, found in Costa Rica, and Geodina salmonicolor, found in the Dominican Republic.
