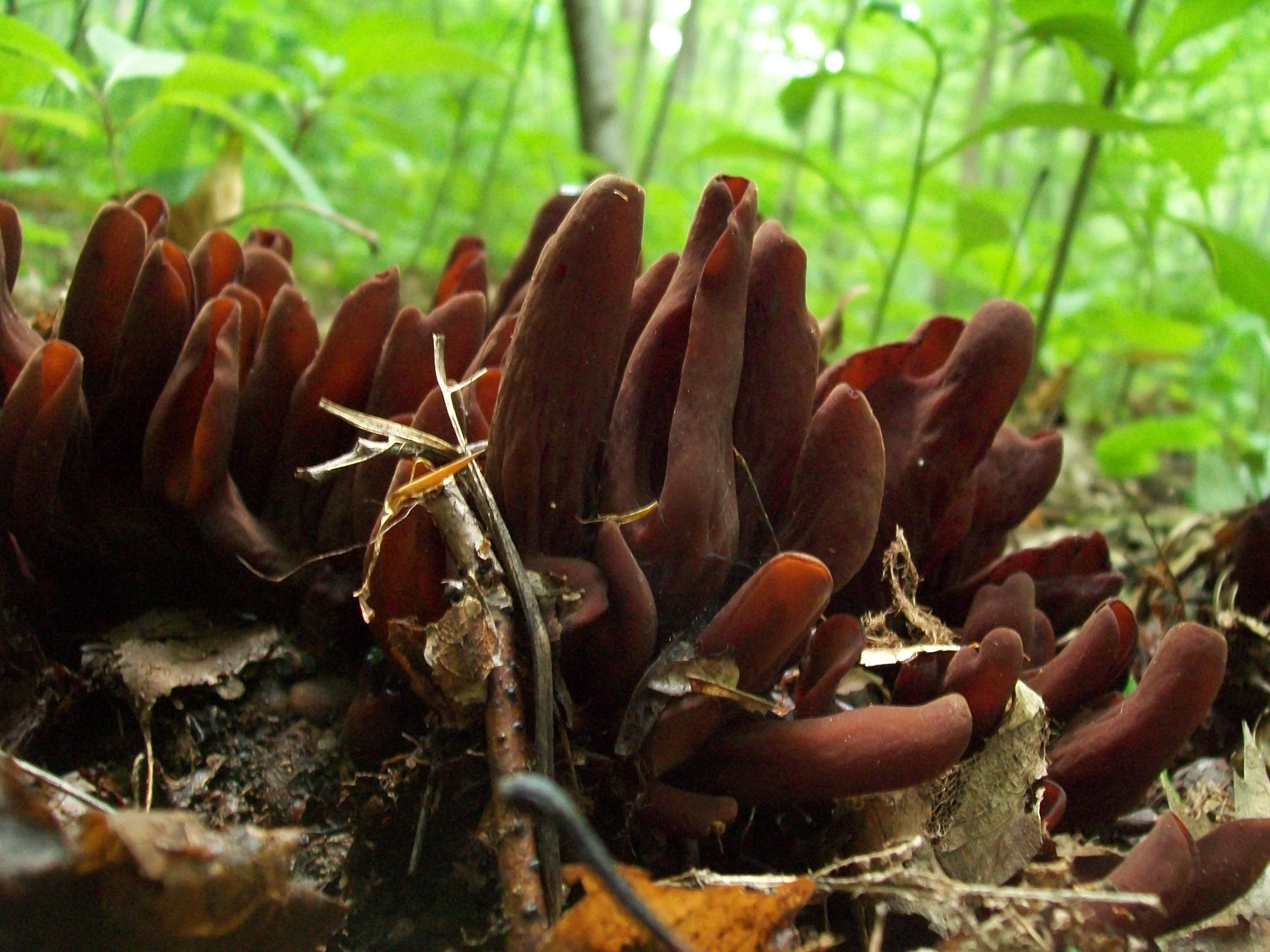
- Wynnea americana

Scientific classification
- Kingdom: Fungi
- Division: Ascomycota
- Class: Pezizomycetes
- Order: Pezizales
- Family: Sarcoscyphaceae
- Genus: Wynnea; Berk. & M.A.Curtis (1867)

Type species
- Wynnea gigantea Berk. & M.A.Curtis (1867)

Species
- W. americana W. gigantea W. intermedia W. macrospora W. macrotis W. sinensis W. sparassoides

= Wynnea =

Genus of fungi

Wynnea is a genus of fungi in the family Sarcoscyphaceae. Circumscribed by Miles Joseph Berkeley and Moses Ashley Curtis in 1867, the genus contains seven species that have ear-shaped fruit bodies that grow on the ground. Wynnea species have a worldwide distribution and have been collected from the United States, Costa Rica, India, and China.

== Taxonomy ==
The genus Wynnea was circumscribed by English naturalist Miles Joseph Berkeley in 1867 to accommodate the species Wynnea gigantea and Peziza macrotis. The former specimen was collected by Botteri near Orizaba, Mexico, and the latter had been described by Berkeley in his Journal of Botany and Kew Garden Miscellany (1851) Both species were subsequently illustrated in Cooke's Micrographia. No other collections of Wynnea were reported for several decades, and in Pier Andrea Saccardo's Sylloge, the genus was reduced to synonymy with the genus Midotis. American mycologist Roland Thaxter described a new species in 1905, W. americana, which was collected in Tennessee.

== Description ==
The fruit bodies (technically called apothecia) are thick, firm, tough and become almost leathery after drying. Standing erect, the ear-shaped apothecia are several- to many-clustered on a common stalk that arises from a sclerotium, a hardened mass of mycelium buried in the earth. The paraphyses (sterile cells interspersed amongst the asci) are cylindrical, simple or branched. The spore-producing structures, the asci, are cylindrical, and taper to an elongated base that penetrate to underneath the hymenium.

Like other members of the family Sarcoscyphaceae, Wynnea species have multinucleate ascospores and paraphyses. The ascus has a thickened apical ring capped by a hinged operculum; its opening often is oriented obliquely, a condition referred to as suboperculate. Three structural components are involved in spore discharge in Wynnea species: the operculum, the suboperculum, and the zone of dehiscence. Collectively, these three structures are known as the apical apparatus.

== Distribution ==
Wynnea species have a worldwide distribution. They have been collected from several North American locations; in the United States, they have been found in Tennessee, New York, West Virginia, North Carolina, Ohio, and Pennsylvania. Wynnea species have also been collected in Costa Rica, and India. W. macrospora and W. sinensis are found in Guizhou Province, China.

== Species ==
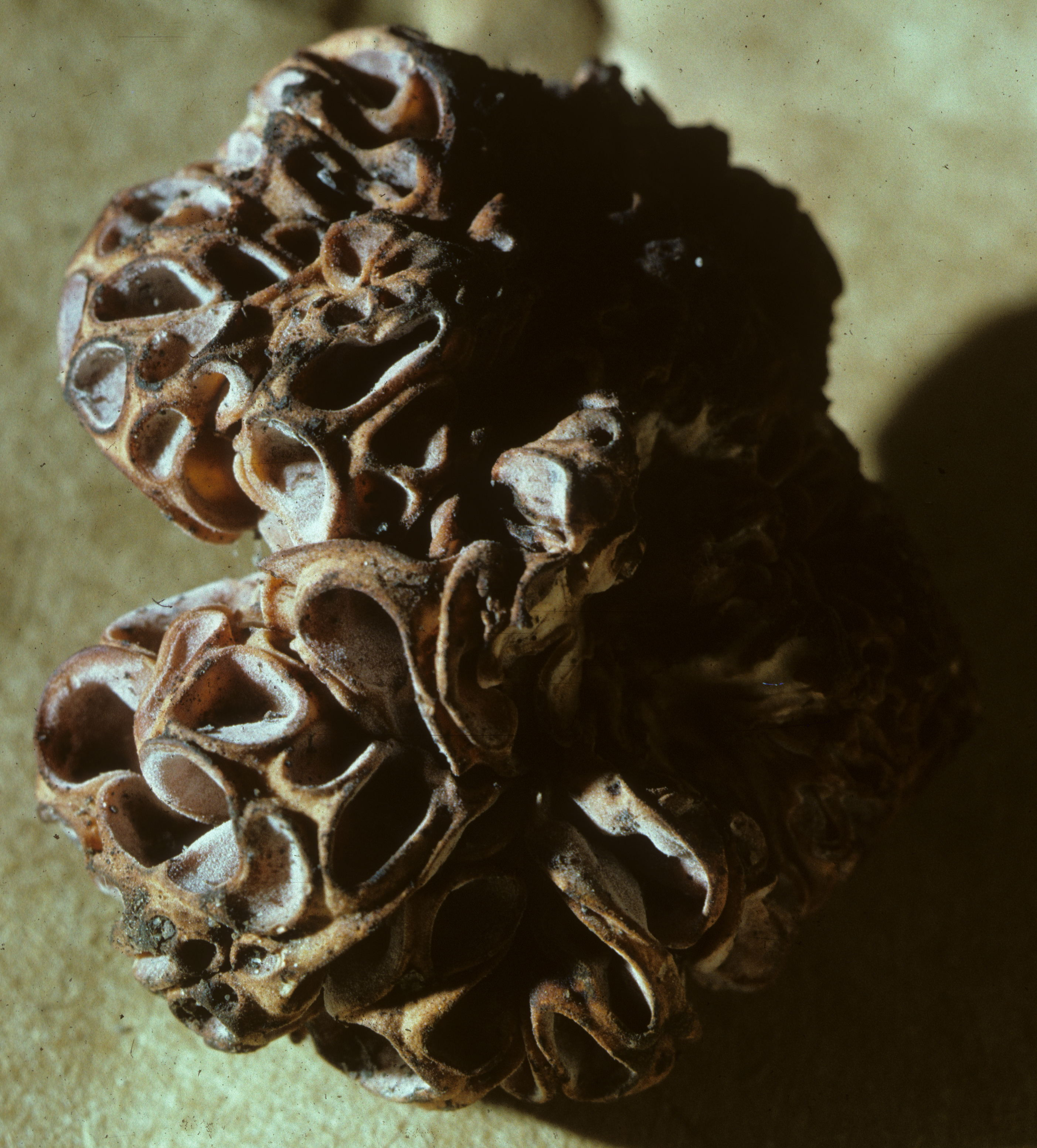
Wynnea sparassoides

There are eight species described in the genus Wynnea:

- W. americana
- W. gigantea
- W. intermedia
- W. macrospora
- W. mactrotis

The spoon-shaped apothecia originate from a fleshy, brown, underground sclerotium; the external surface color is brown when fresh, and dark brown on drying; the height may reach 5 to 8 centimetres (2.0 to 3.1 in). This is one of the original Wynnea species, and was first named Peziza macrotitis when first described in 1851, later named Wynnea macrotis by Berkeley, and then again to Midotis macrotis by Saccardo in 1889. It was collected again in India (West Bengal) and redescribed in 1969.

- W. sinensis
- W. sparassoides

This species has a roughly oval head that is 6 to 8 centimetres (2.4 to 3.1 in) wide connected to a stipe that is up to 30 centimetres (11.8 in) long by 2–2.5 centimetres (0.8–1.0 in) wide.
