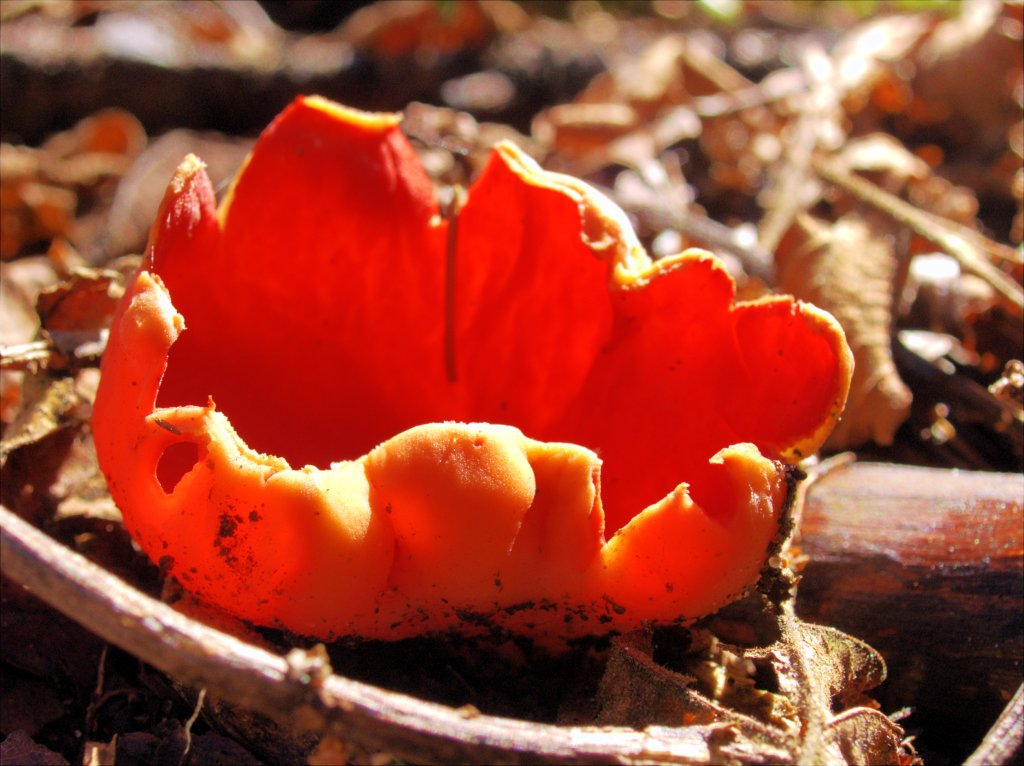
- Sarcoscypha coccinea, the scarlet elf cup

Scientific classification
- Kingdom: Fungi
- Division: Ascomycota
- Class: Pezizomycetes
- Order: Pezizales
- Family: Sarcoscyphaceae; Le Gal ex Eckblad (1968)

Type genus
- Sarcoscypha (Fr.) Boud. (1885)

= Sarcoscyphaceae =

Family of fungi

The Sarcoscyphaceae are a family of cup fungi in the order Pezizales. Members of the Sarcoscyphaceae are cosmopolitan in distribution, found in both tropical and temperate regions.

== Genera ==
A 2008 estimate placed 13 genera and 102 species in the family:

- Aurophora Rifai 1968
- Cookeina Kuntze 1891
- Geodina Denison 1965
- Kompsoscypha Pfister 1989
- Microstoma (fungus) Bernstein 1852
- Nanoscypha Denison 1972
- Phillipsia Berk. 1881
- Pithya Fuckel 1870
- Pseudopithyella Seaver 1928
- Sarcoscypha (Fr.) Boud. 1885: anamorphs are Molliardiomyces Paden 1984
- Thindia Korf & Waraitch 1971
- Wynnea Berk. & M.A. Curtis 1867
