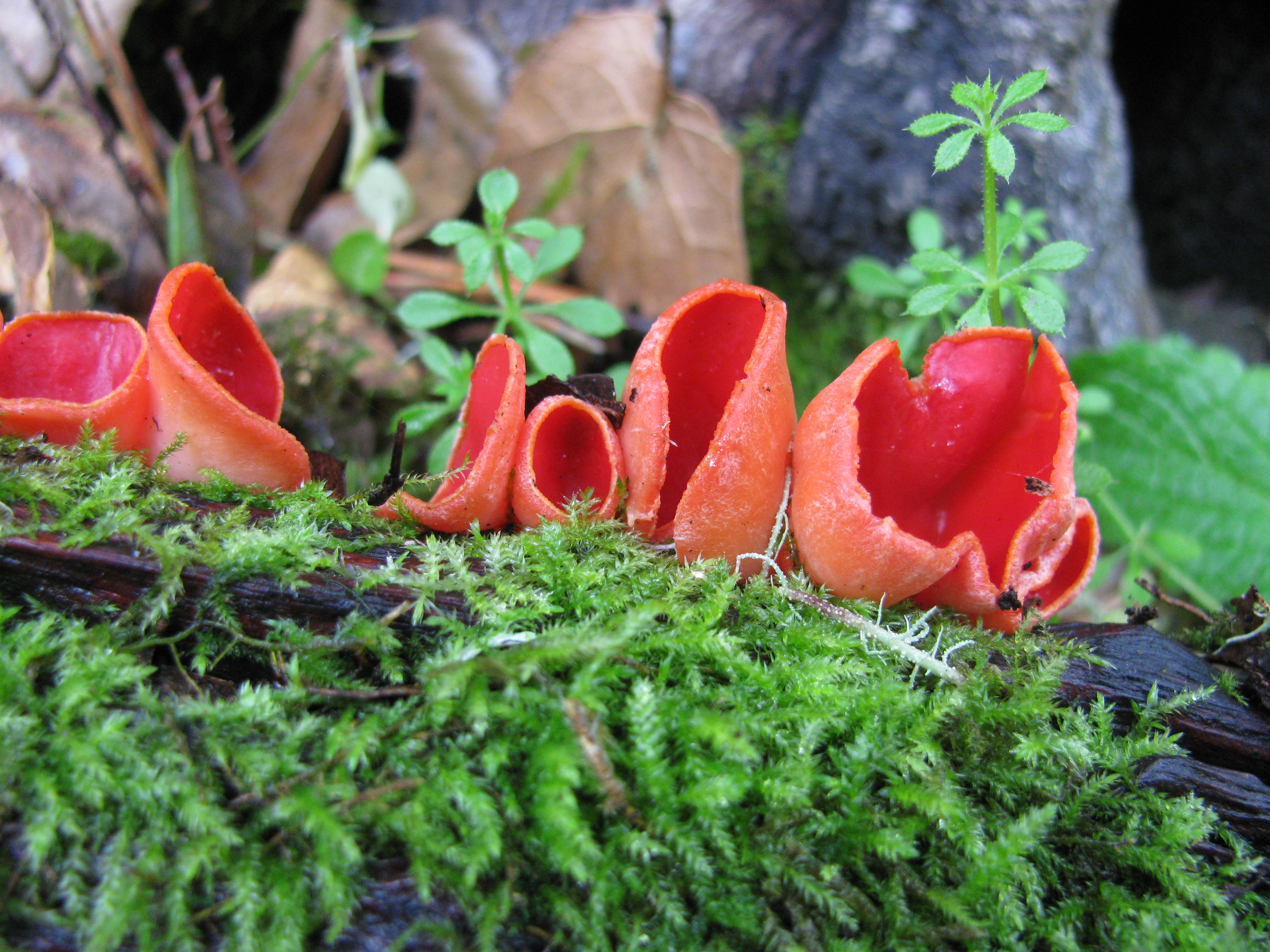

Scientific classification
- Kingdom: Fungi
- Division: Ascomycota
- Class: Pezizomycetes
- Order: Pezizales
- Family: Sarcoscyphaceae
- Genus: Sarcoscypha
- Species: S. coccinea

Binomial name
- Sarcoscypha coccinea (Scop.) Lambotte (1889)

Synonyms
- List: Helvella coccinea Schaeff. (1772); Peziza coccinea Jacq. (1774); Peziza cochleata Batsch (1783); Peziza dichroa Holmsk. (1799); Peziza coccinea Jacq. (1800); Peziza aurantia Schumach. (1803); Macroscyphus coccineus (Scop.) Gray (1821); Peziza aurantiaca Pers. (1822); Lachnea coccinea (Jacq.) Gillet (1887); Lachnea coccinea (Jacq.) W.Phillips (1887); Geopyxis coccinea (Scop.) Massee (1895); Sarcoscypha coccinea (Scop.) Sacc. ex Durand (1900); Plectania coccinea (Scop.) Fuckel ex Seaver (1928)

= Sarcoscypha coccinea =

Species of fungus

Sarcoscypha coccinea
- Mycological characteristics
- Smooth hymenium
- No distinct cap
- Hymenium attachment is irregular or not applicable
- Lacks a stipe
- Ecology is saprotrophic
- Edibility is edible

Sarcoscypha coccinea, commonly known as the scarlet elf cup, scarlet elf cap, or the scarlet cup, is a species of fungus in the family Sarcoscyphaceae of the order Pezizales. The type species of the genus Sarcoscypha, S. coccinea has been known by many names since its first appearance in the scientific literature in 1772. Phylogenetic analysis shows the species to be most closely related to other Sarcoscypha species that contain numerous small oil droplets in their spores, such as the North Atlantic island species S. macaronesica. Due to similar physical appearances and sometimes overlapping distributions, S. coccinea has often been confused with S. occidentalis, S. austriaca, and S. dudleyi. The brilliant red interior of the cups—from which both the common and scientific names are derived—contrasts with the lighter-colored exterior. Molliardiomyces eucoccinea is the name given to the imperfect form of the fungus that lacks a sexually reproductive stage in its life cycle.

The saprobic fungus grows on decaying sticks and branches in damp spots on forest floors, generally buried under leaf litter or in the soil. The cup-shaped fruit bodies are usually produced during the cooler months of winter and early spring. It is widely distributed in the Northern Hemisphere and has been found in Africa, Eurasia, the Americas, and Australia. The edibility of the fruit bodies is well established, but its small size, small abundance, tough texture, and insubstantial fruitings would dissuade most people from collecting for the table. The fungus has been used medicinally by the Oneida Native Americans, and also as a colorful component of table decorations in England. In the northern part of Russia, where fruitings are more frequent, it is consumed in salads, fried with smetana, or just used as colored dressing for meals.

== Taxonomy ==
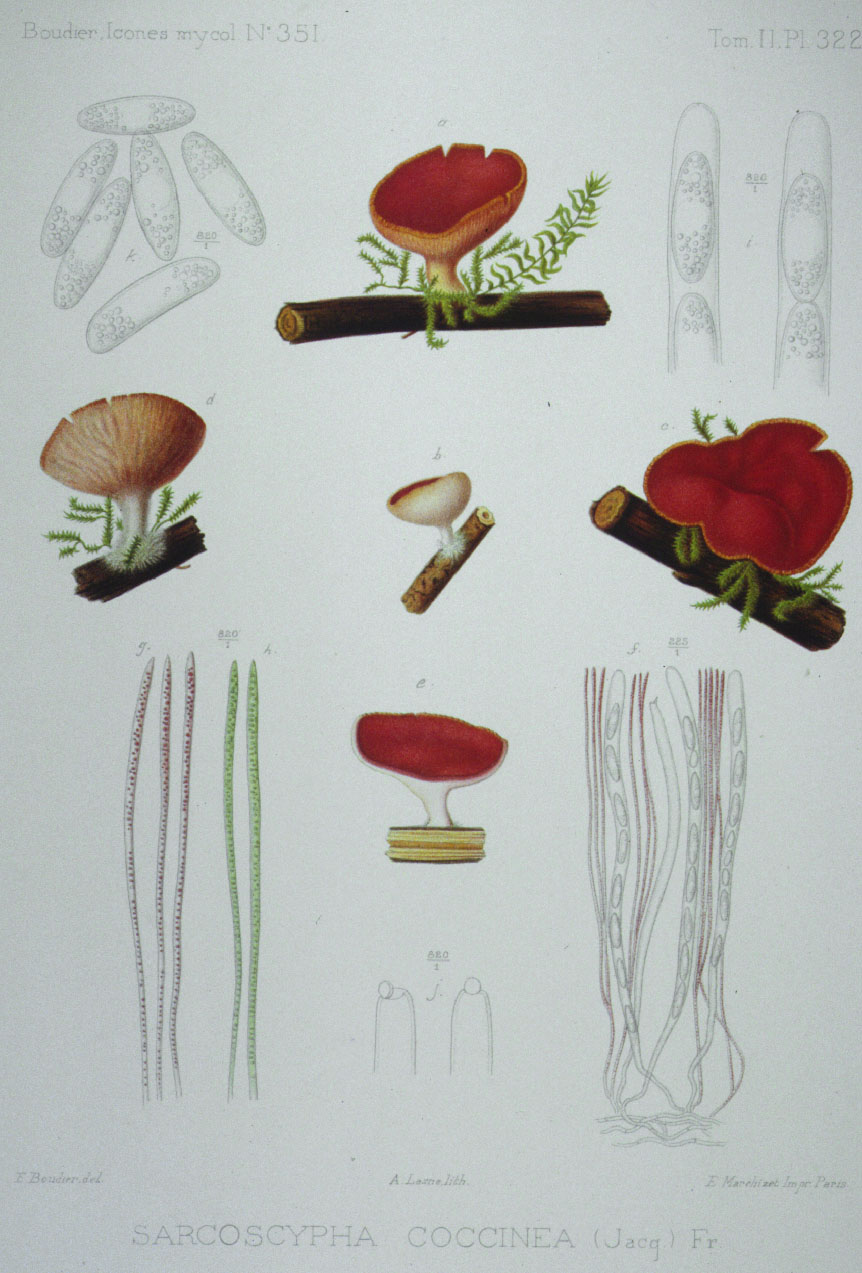
Drawings by Jean Louis Émile Boudier

The species was originally named Helvella coccinea by the Italian naturalist Giovanni Antonio Scopoli in 1772. Other early names include Peziza coccinea (Nikolaus Joseph von Jacquin, 1774) and Peziza dichroa (Theodor Holmskjold, 1799). Although some authors in older literature have applied the generic name Plectania to the taxon following Karl Fuckel's 1870 name change (e.g. Seaver, 1928; Kanouse, 1948; Nannfeldt, 1949; Le Gal, 1953), that name is now used for a fungus with brownish-black fruit bodies. Sarcoscypha coccinea was given its current name by Jean Baptiste Émil Lambotte in 1889.

Obligate synonyms (different names for the same species based on one type) include Lachnea coccinea Gillet (1880), Macroscyphus coccineus Gray (1821), and Peziza dichroa Holmskjold (1799). Taxonomic synonyms (different names for the same species, based on different types) include Peziza aurantia Schumacher (1803), Peziza aurantiaca Persoon (1822), Peziza coccinea Jacquin (1774), Helvella coccinea Schaeffer (1774), Lachnea coccinea Phillips (1887), Geopyxis coccinea Massee (1895), Sarcoscypha coccinea Saccardo ex Durand (1900), Plectania coccinea (Fuckel ex Seaver), and Peziza cochleata Batsch (1783).

Sarcoscypha coccinea is the type species of the genus Sarcoscypha, having been first explicitly designated as such in 1931 by Frederick Clements and Cornelius Lott Shear. A 1990 publication revealed that the genus name Sarcoscypha had been used previously by Carl F. P. von Martius as the name of a tribe in the genus Peziza; according to the rules of Botanical Nomenclature, this meant that the generic name Peziza had priority over Sarcoscypha. To address the taxonomical dilemma, the genus name Sarcoscypha was conserved against Peziza, with S. coccinea as the type species, to "avoid the creation of a new generic name for the scarlet cups and also to avoid the disadvantageous loss of a generic name widely used in the popular and scientific literature". The specific epithet coccinea is derived from the Latin word meaning "deep red". The species is commonly known as the "scarlet elf cup", the "scarlet elf cap", or the "scarlet cup fungus".

S. coccinea var. jurana was described by Jean Boudier (1903) as a variety of the species having a brighter and more orange-colored fruit body, and with flattened or blunt-ended ascospores. Today it is known as the distinct species S. jurana. S. coccinea var. albida, named by George Edward Massee in 1903 (as Geopyxis coccinea var. albida), has a cream-colored rather than red interior surface, but is otherwise identical to the typical variety.

- - - - - - S. coccinea
          - S. macaronesica
        - S. austriaca
        - S. humberiana
      - S. knixoniana
    - Other Sarcoscypha spp.

Phylogeny and relationships of S. coccinea and related species based on ITS sequences and morphological characteristics.

Within the large area that includes the temperate to alpine-boreal zone of the Northern Hemisphere (Europe and North America), only S. coccinea had been recognized until the 1980s. However, it had been known since the early 1900s that there existed several macroscopically indistinguishable taxa with various microscopic differences: the distribution and number of oil droplets in fresh spores; germination behavior; and spore shape. Detailed analysis and comparison of fresh specimens revealed that what had been collectively called "S. coccinea" actually consisted of four distinct species: S. austriaca, S. coccinea, S. dudleyi, and S. jurana.

The phylogenetic relationships in the genus Sarcoscypha were analyzed by Francis Harrington in the late 1990s. Her cladistic analysis combined comparisons of the sequences of the internal transcribed spacer in the non-functional RNA with fifteen traditional morphological characteristics, such as spore features, fruit body shape, and degree of curliness of the "hairs" that form the tomentum. Based on her analysis, S. coccinea is part of a clade that includes the species S. austriaca, S. macaronesica, S. knixoniana and S. humberiana. All of these Sarcoscypha species have numerous, small oil droplets in their spores. Its closest relative, S. macaronesica, is found on the Canary Islands and Madeira; Harrington hypothesized that the most recent common ancestor of the two species originated in Europe and was later dispersed to the Macaronesian islands.

== Description ==
Initially spherical, the fruit bodies are later shallowly saucer- or cup-shaped with rolled-in rims, and measure 2–6 cm (0.8–2.4 in) in diameter. The inner surface of the cup is deep red (fading to orange when dry) and smooth, while the outer surface is whitish and covered with a dense matted layer of tiny hairs (a tomentum). The stipe, when present, is stout and up to 4 cm (1.6 in) long (if deeply buried) by 0.3–0.7 cm (0.1–0.3 in) thick, and whitish, with a tomentum. Color variants of the fungus exist that have reduced or absent pigmentation; these forms may be orange, yellow, or even white (as in the variety albida). In the Netherlands, white fruit bodies have been found growing in the polders.

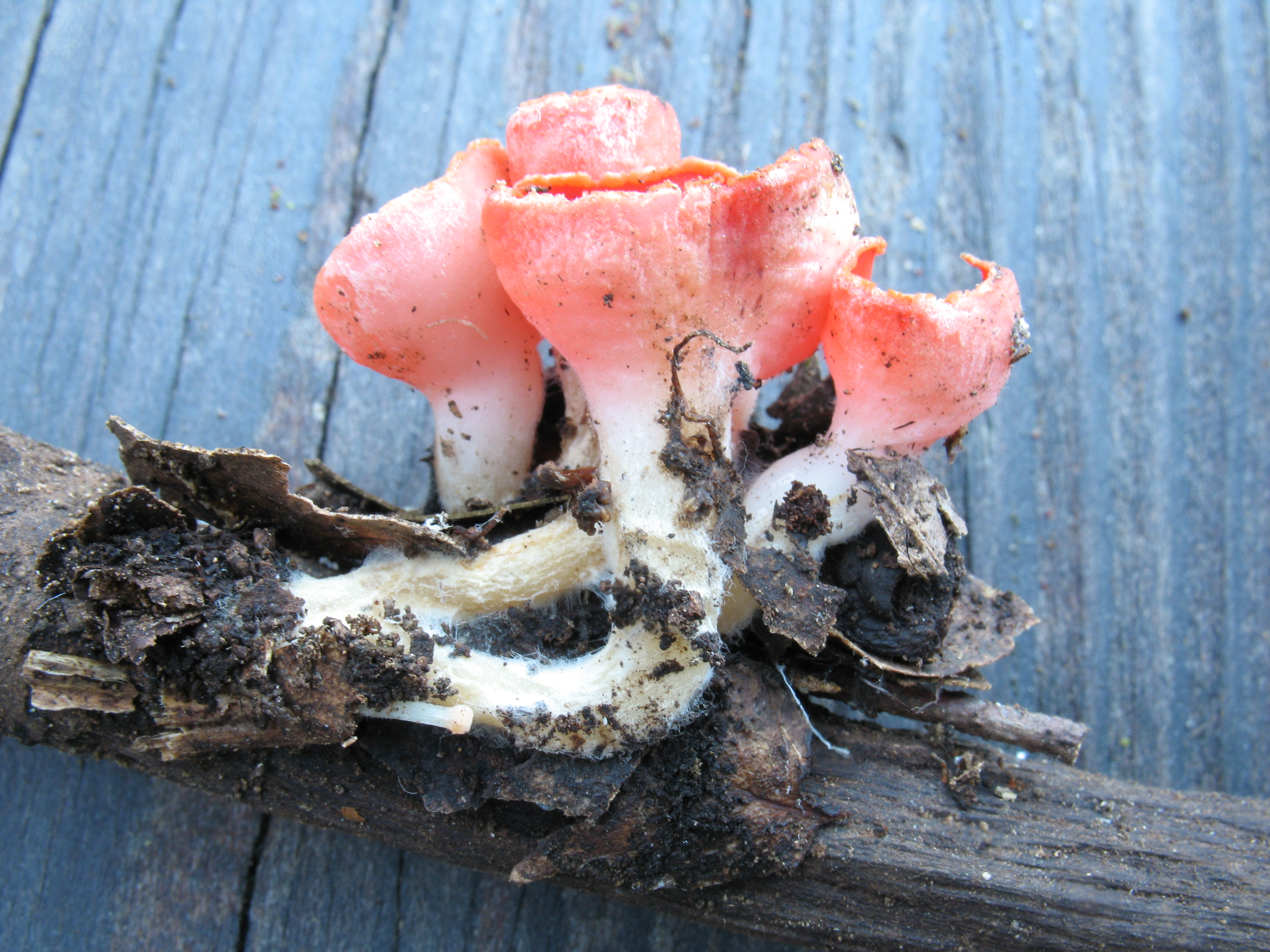
The stalks and outer surface are lighter in color than the interior.

Sarcoscypha coccinea is one of several fungi whose fruit bodies have been noted to make a "puffing" sound—an audible manifestation of spore-discharge where thousands of asci simultaneously explode to release a cloud of spores.

The spores are 26–40 by 10–12 μm, elliptical, smooth, colorless, hyaline (translucent), and have small lipid droplets concentrated at either end. The droplets are refractive to light and visible with light microscopy. In older, dried specimens (such as herbarium material), the droplets may coalesce and hinder the identification of species. Depending on their geographical origin, the spores may have a delicate mucilaginous sheath or "envelope"; European specimens are devoid of an envelope while specimens from North America invariably have one.

The asci are long and cylindrical, and taper into a short stem-like base; they measure 300–375 by 14–16 μm. Although in most Pezizales all of the ascospores are formed simultaneously through delimitation by an inner and outer membrane, in S. coccinea the ascospores located in the basal parts of the ascus develop faster. The paraphyses (sterile filamentous hyphae present in the hymenium) are about 3 μm wide (and only slightly thickened at the apex), and contain red pigment granules.

=== Anamorph form ===
Anamorphic or imperfect fungi are those that seem to lack a sexual stage in their life cycle, and typically reproduce by the process of mitosis in structures called conidia. In some cases, the sexual stage—or teleomorph stage—is later identified, and a teleomorph-anamorph relationship is established between the species. The International Code of Nomenclature for algae, fungi, and plants permits the recognition of two (or more) names for one and the same organism, one based on the teleomorph, the other(s) restricted to the anamorph. The name of the anamorphic state of S. coccinea is Molliardiomyces eucoccinea, first described by Marin Molliard in 1904. Molliard found the growth of the conidia to resemble those of the genera Coryne and Chlorosplenium rather than the Pezizaceae, and he considered that this suggested an affinity between Sarcoscypha and the family Helvellaceae. In 1972, John W. Paden again described the anamorph, but like Molliard, failed to give a complete description of the species. In 1984, Paden created a new genus he named Molliardiomyces to contain the anamorphic forms of several Sarcoscypha species, and set Molliardiomyces eucoccinea as the type species. This form produces colorless conidiophores (specialized stalks that bear conidia) that are usually irregularly branched, measuring 30–110 by 3.2–4.7 μm. The conidia are ellipsoidal to egg-shaped, smooth, translucent (hyaline), and 4.8–16.0 by 2.3–5.8 μm; they tend to accumulate in "mucilaginous masses".

=== Similar species ===
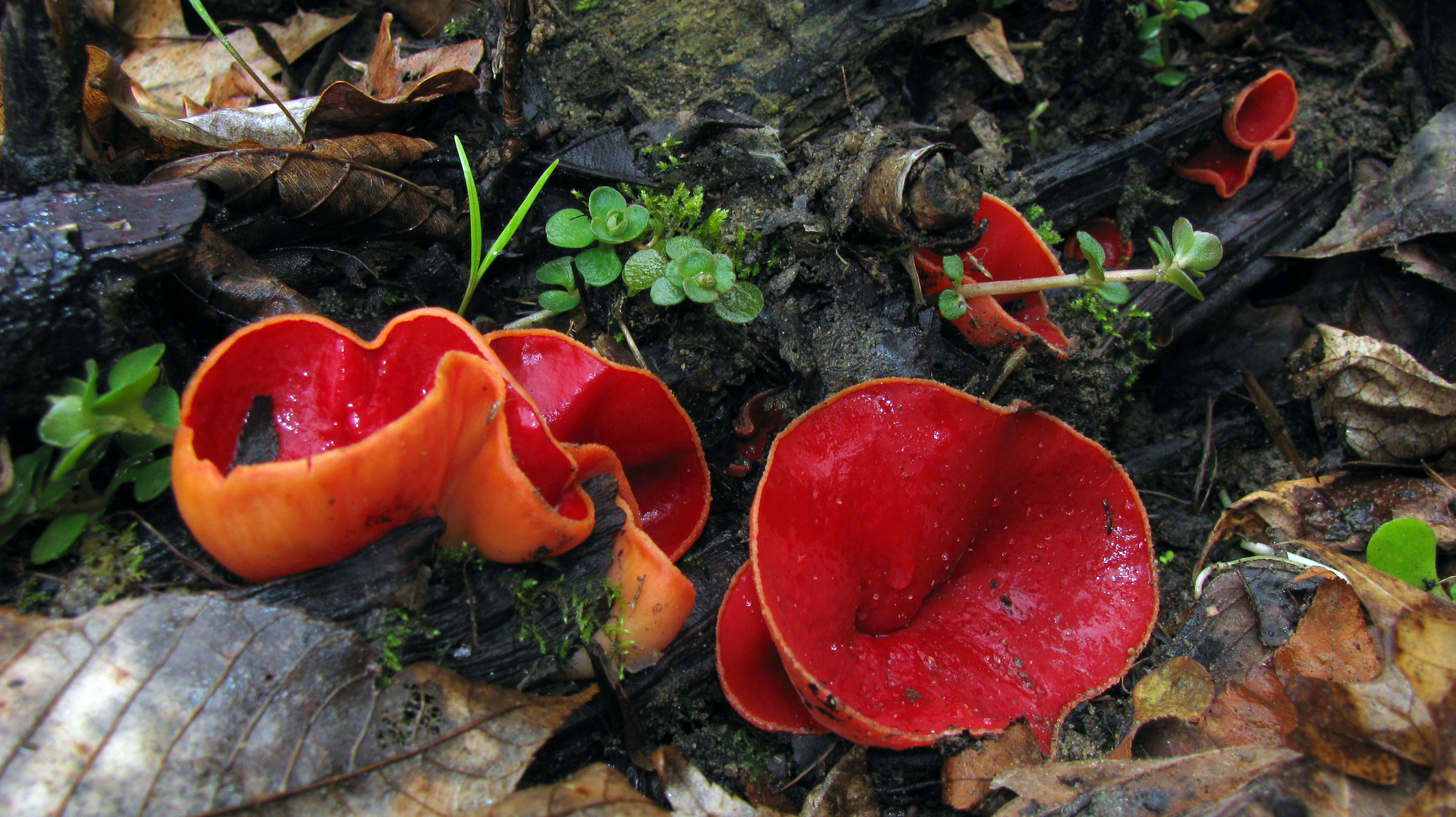
Sarcoscypha austriaca

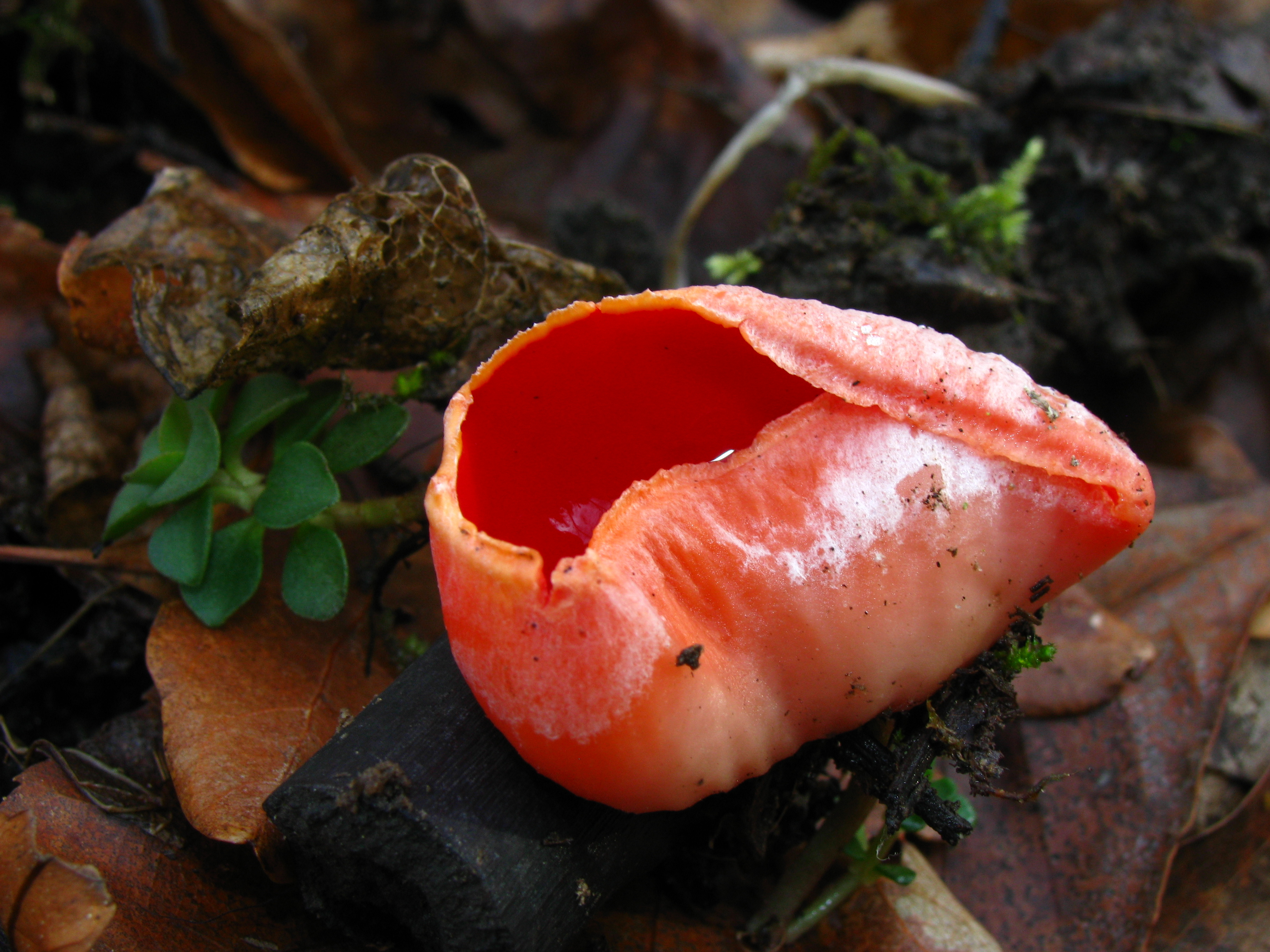
Sarcoscypha dudleyi

Similar species include S. dudleyi and S. austriaca, and in the literature, confusion amongst the three is common. Examination of microscopic features is often required to definitively differentiate between the species. Sarcoscypha occidentalis has smaller cups (0.5–2.0 cm wide), a more pronounced stalk that is 1–3 cm long, and a smooth exterior surface. Unlike S. coccinea, it is only found in the New World and in east and midwest North America, but not in the far west. It also occurs in Central America and the Caribbean. In North America, S. austriaca and S. dudleyi are found in eastern regions of the continent. S. dudleyi has elliptical spores with rounded ends that are 25–33 by 12–14 μm and completely sheathed when fresh. S. austriaca has elliptical spores that are 29–36 by 12–15 μm that are not completely sheathed when fresh, but have small polar caps on either end. The Macaronesian species S. macaronesica, frequently misidentified as S. coccinea, has smaller spores, typically measuring 20.5–28 by 7.3–11 μm and smaller fruit bodies—up to 2 cm (0.8 in) wide.

Other similar species include Plectania melastoma, Plectania nannfeldtii, and Scutellinia scutellata.

== Ecology, habitat and distribution ==
A saprobic species, S. coccinea grows on decaying woody material from various plants: the rose family, beech, hazel, willow, elm, and, in the Mediterranean, oak. The fruit bodies of S. coccinea are often found growing singly or clustered in groups on buried or partly buried sticks in deciduous forests, growing from January to April. A Hungarian study noted that the fungus was found mainly on twigs of European hornbeam (Carpinus betulus) that were typically less than 5 cm (2.0 in) long. Fruit bodies growing on sticks above the ground tend to be smaller than those on buried wood. Mushrooms that are sheltered from wind also grow larger than their more exposed counterparts. The fruit bodies are persistent and may last for several weeks if the weather is cool. The time required for the development of fruit bodies has been estimated to be about 24 weeks, although it was noted that "the maximum life span may well be more than 24 weeks because the decline of the colonies seemed to be associated more with sunny, windy weather rather than with old age." One field guide calls the fungus "a welcome sight after a long, desperate winter and ... the harbinger of a new year of mushrooming".

Common over much of the Northern Hemisphere, S. coccinea occurs in the Midwest, in the valleys between the Pacific coast, the Sierra Nevada, and the Cascade Range. Its North American distribution extends north to various locations in Canada and south to the Mexican state Jalisco. The fungus has also been collected from Chile in South America. It is also found in the Old World—Europe, Africa, Asia, Australia, and India. Specimens collected from the Macaronesian islands that once thought to be S. coccinea were later determined to be the distinct species S. macaronesica. A 1995 study of the occurrence of British Sarcoscypha (including S. coccinea and S. austriaca) concluded that S. coccinea was becoming very rare in Great Britain. All species of Sarcoscypha, including S. coccinea, are Red-Listed in Europe. In Turkey, it is considered critically endangered.

The fruit bodies have been noted to be a source of food for rodents in the winter and for slugs in the summer.

== Chemistry ==
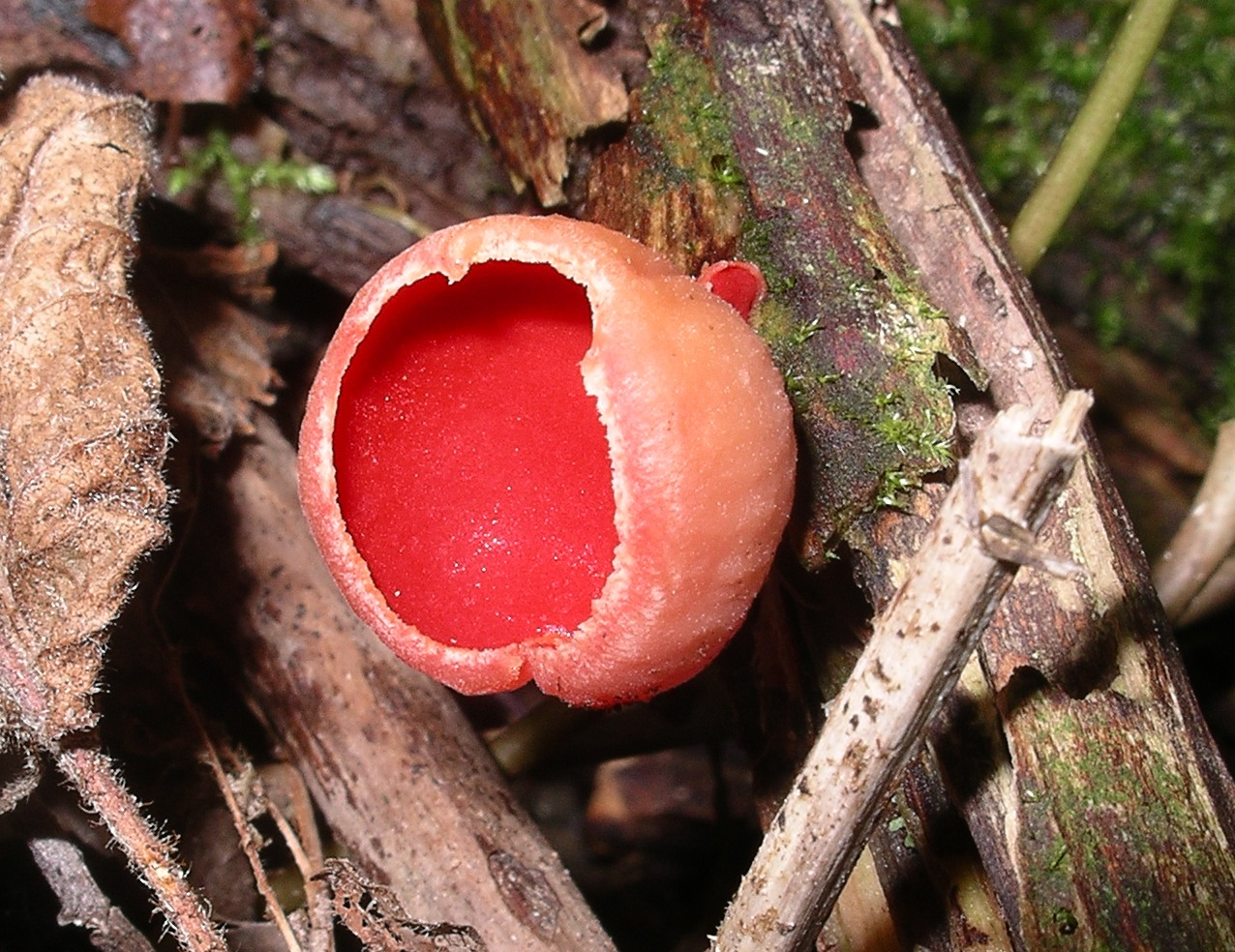
Near Llandegfan, North Wales

The red color of the fruit bodies is caused by five types of carotenoid pigments, including plectaniaxanthin and β-carotene. Carotenoids are lipid-soluble and are stored within granules in the paraphyses. British-Canadian mycologist Arthur Henry Reginald Buller suggested that pigments in fruit bodies exposed to the Sun absorb some of the Sun's rays, raising the temperature of the hymenium—hastening the development of the ascus and subsequent spore discharge.

Lectins are sugar-binding proteins that are used in blood typing, biochemical studies and medical research. A lectin has been purified and characterized from S. coccinea fruit bodies that can bind selectively to several specific carbohydrate molecules, including lactose.

== Uses ==
Sarcoscypha coccinea was used as a medicinal fungus by the Oneida people and possibly by other tribes of the Iroquois Six Nations. The fungus, after being dried and ground up into a powder, was applied as a styptic, particularly to the navels of newborn children that were not healing properly after the umbilical cord had been severed. Pulverized fruit bodies were also kept under bandages made of soft-tanned deerskin. In Scarborough, England, the fruit bodies used to be arranged with moss and leaves and sold as a table decoration.

The species is said to be edible (perhaps best dried), inedible, or "not recommended", depending on the author. Although its insubstantial fruit body and low numbers do not make it particularly suitable for the table, one source claims that "children in the Jura are said to eat it raw on bread and butter; and one French author suggests adding the cups, with a little Kirsch, to a fresh fruit salad."
