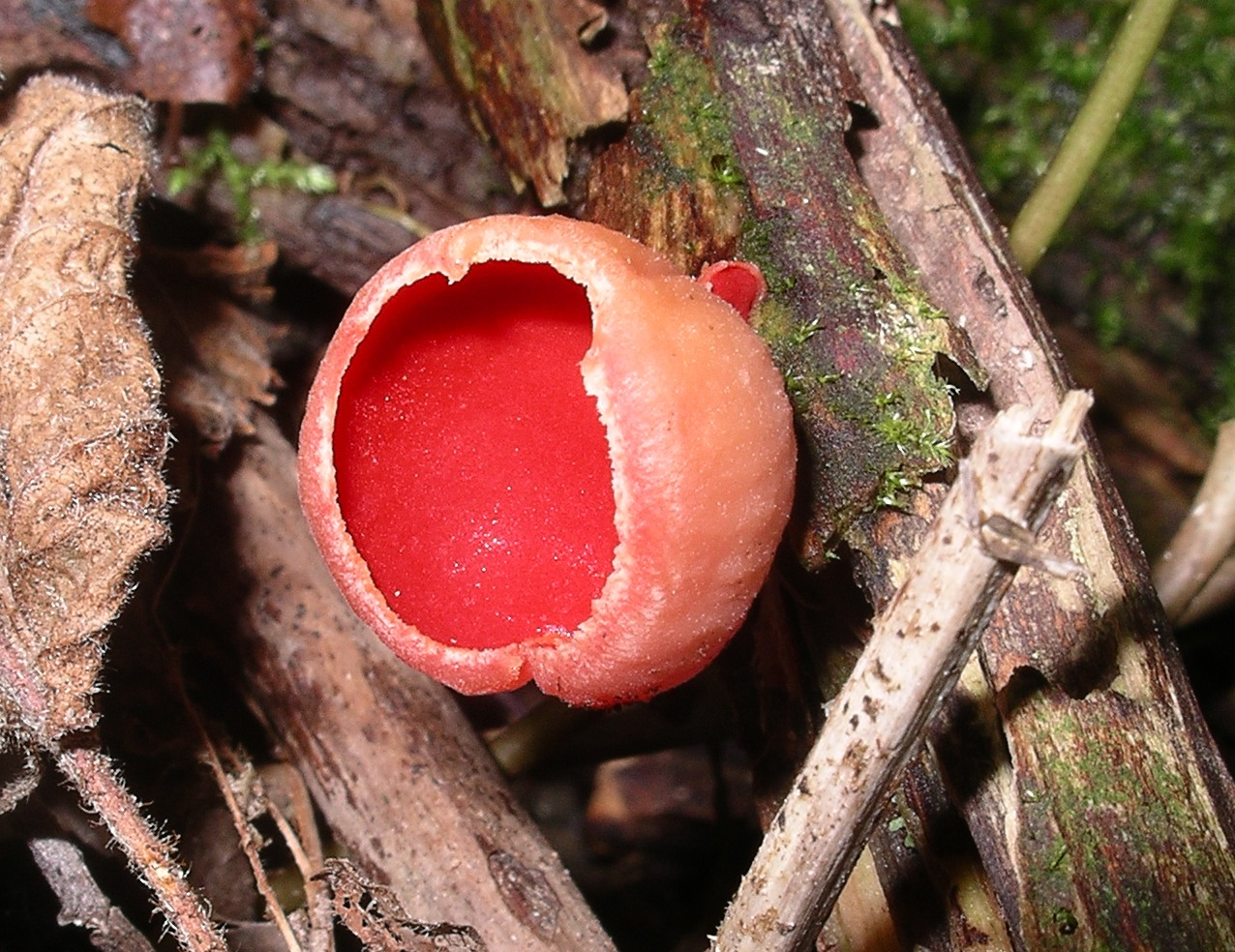
- Scarlet elf cap

Scientific classification
- Kingdom: Fungi
- Division: Ascomycota
- Class: Pezizomycetes
- Order: Pezizales
- Family: Sarcoscyphaceae
- Genus: Sarcoscypha (Fr.) Boud.

= Sarcoscypha =

Genus of fungi

Sarcoscypha is a genus of ascomycete fungus and a type genus of the family Sarcoscyphaceae. Species of Sarcoscypha are present in Europe, North America and tropical Asia. They are characterised by a cup-shaped apothecium which is often brightly coloured. They have had a range of popular uses, one of which was as a table decoration. Some members of the family such as S. coccinea and the - according to new knowledge - more common S. austriaca in western Europe and United States have bright scarlet apothecia which have given them familiar names such as the scarlet cup fungus and scarlet elf cap.

The name comes from the Greek skyphos meaning drinking bowl.

Anamorphic forms were given the genus name, Molliardiomyces, but with single name nomenclature in fungi, the latter name is considered a synonym and no longer used.

== Description ==
Species in Sarcoscypha have cup-shaped fruiting bodies (apothecia) that are typically colored bright red or yellow, although a colorless variety of S. coccinea is known. Apothecia usually have a stipe, although some individuals may appear to be attached directly (i.e., sessile) to the growing surface. Asci are cylindrical in shape, thick-walled, and have an apical operculum—a cover or lid that is opened prior to spore discharge.

=== Anamorph form ===
Anamorphic or imperfect fungi are those that seem to lack a sexual stage in their life cycle, and typically reproduce by the process of mitosis in structures called conidia. In some cases, the sexual stage—or teleomorph stage—is later identified, and a teleomorph-anamorph relationship is established between the species. The International Code of Botanical Nomenclature formerly permitted recognition of two (or more) names for one and the same organisms, one based on the teleomorph, the other(s) restricted to the anamorph; this practice was stopped in 2011. The anamorphic state of S. coccinea is Molliardiomyces eucoccinea, first described by Marin Molliard in 1904. In 1972, John W. Paden again described the anamorph, but like Molliard, failed to give a complete description of the species. In 1984, Paden created a new genus Molliardiomyces to contain the anamorphic forms of several Sarcoscypha species, with Molliardiomyces eucoccinea as the type species. This form produces colorless conidiophores (specialized stalks that bear conidia) that are usually irregularly branched, measuring 30–110 by 3.2–4.7 μm. The conidia are ellipsoidal to egg-shaped, smooth, translucent (hyaline), and 4.8–16.0 by 2.3–5.8 μm; they tend to accumulate in "mucilaginous masses".

== Habitat ==
Members of the Sarcoscyphaceae grow as saprotrophs on dead wood, and especially in the case of Sarcoscypha, on mostly damp branches or twigs of hard-wood species often in association with damp loving mosses. There is a strong association with damp places and north facing slopes. Typical locations include woods in damp stream valleys. Fruiting in most species tends to be in late winter or early spring with fruiting bodies produced on the dead wood within which the mycelium grows, although in some cases the apothecium appears to arise from amongst moss or from the leaf-litter. Because of their brilliant colour, many species are very easy to see in damp woodlands before spring growth has started.

In areas with a continental climate, fruiting bodies may be developed underneath snow and are only revealed at the thaw.

== Phylogeny ==
- - - - - - S. coccinea
          - S. macaronesica
        - S. austriaca
        - S. humberiana
      - S. knixoniana
    - - - - S. korfiana
          - - S. occidentalis
            - S. mesocyatha
        - - - S. dudleyi
            - S. emarginata
          - S. hosoyae

Phylogeny and relationships of Sarcoscypha coccinea and related species based on ITS sequences and morphological characteristics.

The phylogenetic relationships in the genus Sarcoscypha were analyzed by Francis Harrington in the late 1990s. The cladistic analysis combined comparison of sequences from the internal transcribed spacer in the non-functional RNA in addition to fifteen traditional morphological characters, such as spore features, fruit body shape, and degree of hair curliness. Based on this analysis, one major clade includes the species S. austriaca, S. macaronesica, S. knixoniana and S. humberiana, while another has S. korfiana, S. occidentalis, S. mesocyatha, S. dudleyi, S. emarginata, and S. hosoyae. S. jarvensis is sister to all these species.

== Species ==
According to the 10th edition of the Dictionary of the Fungi (2008), there are about 28 species in the genus. An incomplete list follows:

- S. austriaca
- S. coccinea
- S. dudleyi
- S. emarginata
- S. excelsa
- S. hosoyae
- S. humberiana
- S. javensis
- S. jurana
- S. knixoniana
- S. korfiana
- S. lilliputiana
- S. macaronesica
- S. mesocyatha
- S. occidentalis
- S. serrata
- S. shennongjiana
- S. vassiljevae

The species Nanoscypha striatispora, formerly included in this list as S. striatispora, was transferred to the genus Nanoscypha to support a monophyly for Sarcoscypha.
