= S. occidentalis =

S. occidentalis may refer to:

- Sarcoscypha occidentalis, the stalked scarlet cup or western scarlet cup, a mushroom species
- Sceloporus occidentalis, the Western fence lizard, a reptile species common in California
- Senna occidentalis, a pantropical plant species
- Simosthenurus occidentalis, the short-faced kangaroo, an extinct marsupial species
- Sorbus occidentalis, a tree species in the genus Sorbus found in Western North America

== See also ==
- List of Latin and Greek words commonly used in systematic names#O
