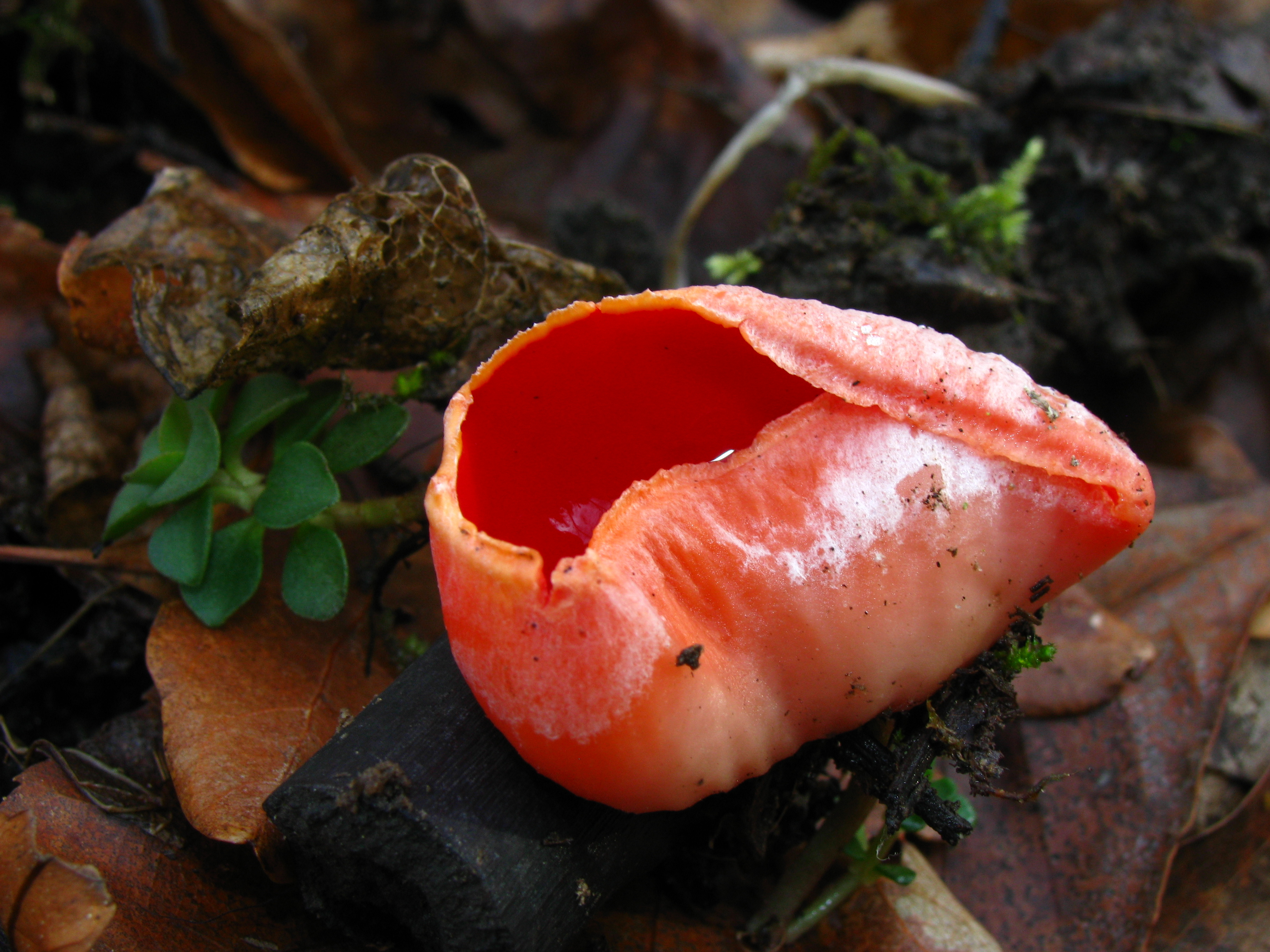

Scientific classification
- Domain: Eukaryota
- Kingdom: Fungi
- Division: Ascomycota
- Class: Pezizomycetes
- Order: Pezizales
- Family: Sarcoscyphaceae
- Genus: Sarcoscypha
- Species: S. dudleyi

Binomial name
- Sarcoscypha dudleyi (Peck) Baral (1984)

Synonyms
- Peziza dudleyi Peck (1894); Molliardiomyces dudleyi F.A.Harr. (1990)

= Sarcoscypha dudleyi =

Species of fungus

Sarcoscypha dudleyi Mycological characteristics
- Smooth hymenium
- No distinct cap
- Hymenium attachment is irregular or not applicable
- Stipe is bare
- Ecology is saprotrophic
- Edibility is unknown

Sarcoscypha dudleyi, commonly known as the crimson cup or the scarlet cup, is a species of fungus in the family Sarcoscyphaceae of the order Pezizales. It has been frequently confused with Sarcoscypha coccinea, but can be distinguished from this and other related species in Sarcoscypha by differences in microscopic characteristics, such as the presence and number of oil droplets in the spores. An imperfect form of the fungus, lacking a sexually reproductive stage in its life cycle, is classified as the species Molliardiomyces dudleyi.

In addition to its main distribution in the central to eastern United States, the fungus has also been recorded once in Bulgaria.

== Taxonomy ==
The species was first collected by the botanist William Russell Dudley in October 1888, in Tompkins County, New York. American mycologist Charles Horton Peck, who described it in the 1894 Annual Report of the New York State Botanist, named it Peziza Dudleyi after its discoverer. Peck noted a physical resemblance to P. aurantia (now known as Aleuria aurantia) and P. inaequalis, and said that it could be distinguished from those species by its yellow hymenium and larger spores. Several mycologists have considered the species to be synonymous with S. coccinea. However, as was later pointed out by Harrington (1990), "the importance of fresh material for species diagnosis, especially for noting ascospore guttulation, cannot be overstated. Although I had examined material (dried herbarium specimens) from western North America I was not prepared to recognize that group as a species distinct from the two, large eastern North American species until I saw fresh (living) material." As is the case with many fungi, microscopic differences between similar species can only be accurately determined by examining fresh material. Harrington analyzed herbarium specimens and fresh material of North American specimens of "S. coccinea", and found that both S. dudleyi and S. austriaca were commonly misidentified. These results echoed a similar 1984 analysis of European specimens, performed by Hans-Otto Baral.

- - S. coccinea and four other Sarcoscypha spp.
  - - - - S. korfiana
        - - S. occidentalis
          - S. mesocyatha
      - - - S. dudleyi
          - S. emarginata
        - S. hosoyae

Phylogeny and relationships of S. dudleyi and related species based on ITS sequences and morphological characteristics.

The phylogenetic relationships in the genus Sarcoscypha were analyzed by Francis Harrington in the late 1990s. The cladistic analysis combined comparison of sequences from the internal transcribed spacer in the non-functional RNA with fifteen traditional morphological characters, such as spore features, fruit body shape, and degree of hair curliness. Based on this analysis, S. dudleyi is part of a clade of evolutionarily related taxa that includes the species S. occidentalis, S. emarginata, S. hosoyae, S. korfiana and S. mesocyatha. All of these species contain large oil droplets in their spores, in contrast to the other major clade of Sarcoscypha (containing the type species S. coccinea), characterized by having smaller, more numerous droplets.

Sarcoscypha dudleyi is commonly known as the "crimson cup" or the "scarlet cup", sharing the latter name with S. coccinea.

== Description ==
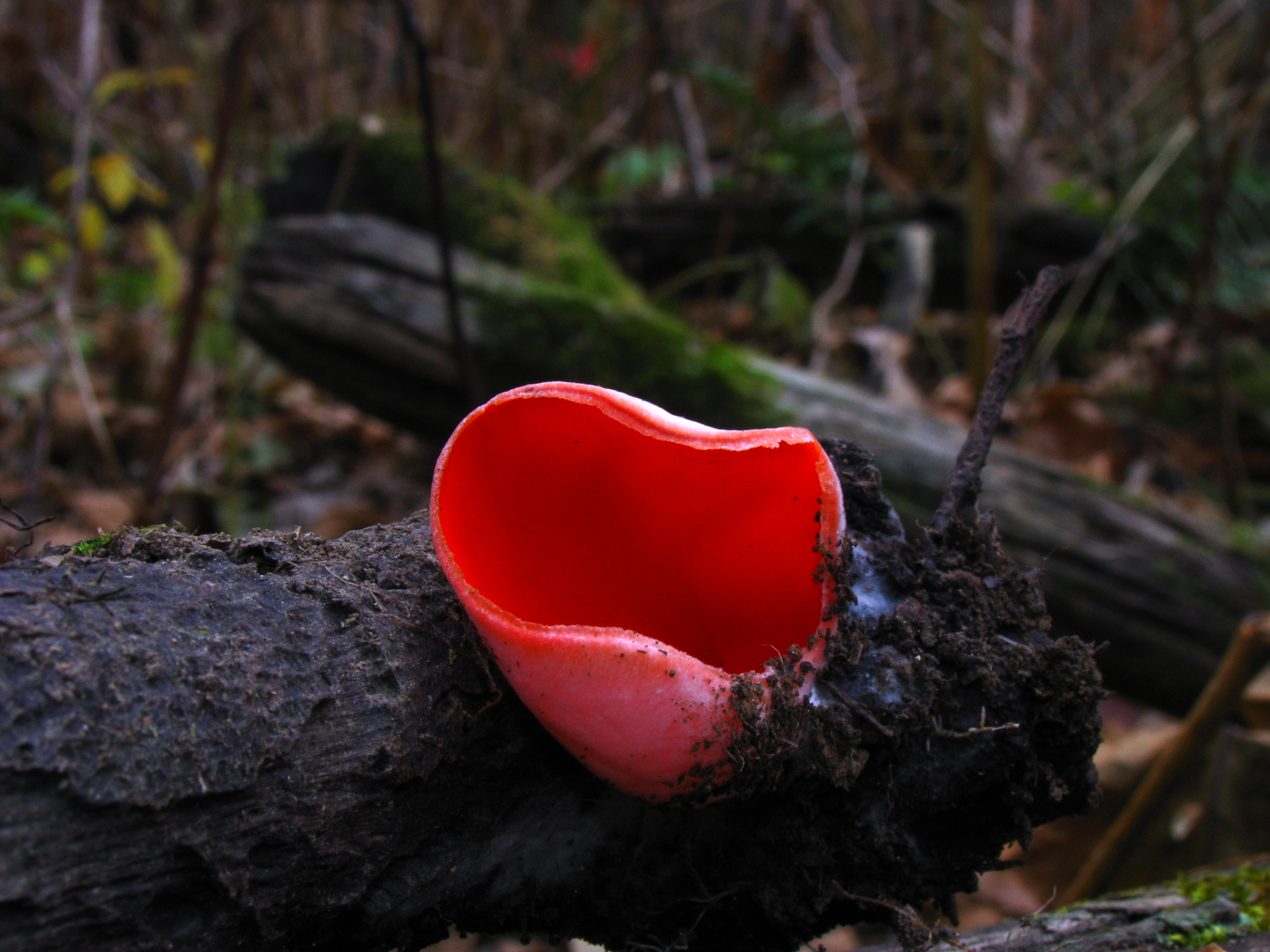
Fruit body growing on wood

The fruit body is 2–6 cm (3/4–2 1/4 in) broad and shallowly to deeply cup-shaped. The exterior surface of the fruit body is covered with whitish, matted "hairs", while the interior fertile surface of the cup (the hymenium) is scarlet- to orange-red. The edge of the cup (or margin) is curved inwards in young fruit bodies. The stem, if present at all, is short.

The asci are 400–500 by 12–14 μm, cylindrical, and operculate. The ascospores are elliptical to cylindrical with rounded ends, uniseriate, hyaline, and measure 26–40 by 10–12 μm. They contain two large oil drops at either end; the oil drops are useful taxonomic characters that may be used to help distinguish S. dudleyi from some other Sarcoscypha species. The spores are covered with a sheath of mucilage, which typically causes the eight spores of the ascus to be ejected together. The paraphyses (sterile filamentous hyphal end cells in the hymenium) are slender, slightly enlarged above, and contain numerous red granules. The granules contain carotenoid pigments such as plectaniaxanthine or beta carotene, and give the fruit body its color.

=== Anamorph form ===
Anamorphic or imperfect fungi are those that seem to lack a sexual stage in their life cycle, and typically reproduce by the process of mitosis in structures called conidia. In some cases, the sexual stage—or teleomorph stage—is later identified, and a teleomorph-anamorph relationship is established between the species. The International Code of Botanical Nomenclature permits the recognition of two (or more) names for one and the same organisms, one based on the teleomorph, the other(s) restricted to the anamorph. The anamorphic state of S. dudleyi is Molliardiomyces dudleyi.

== Habitat and distribution ==
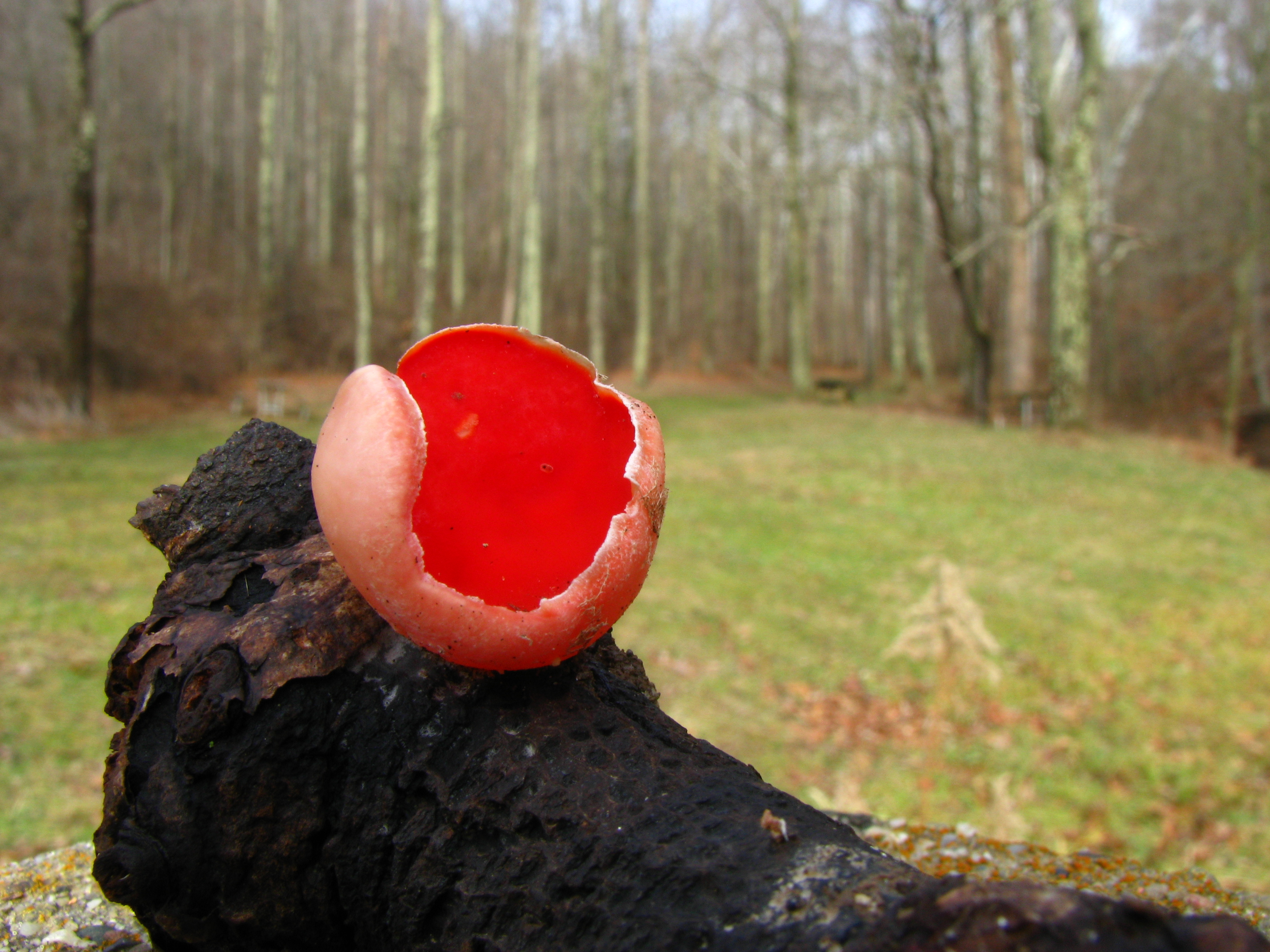
In Strouds Run State Park, Ohio

Sarcoscypha dudleyi is a saprobic species, and derives nutrients by breaking down the complex insoluble polysaccharides found in woody material, such as cellulose and lignin. Fruit bodies are found growing singly or in very small groups, and are attached to buried or partially buried sticks in forests. Basswood has been noted to be a preferred wood type for the species. Fruit bodies typically appear during early spring, but may occasionally also in late fall. Although the distribution appears to be largely restricted to the eastern United States, it was once reported in Bulgaria in 1994, representing the first European collection.
