= Neopyrenochaeta annellidica =

Scientific classification
- Domain: Eukaryota
- Kingdom: Fungi
- Division: Ascomycota
- Class: Dothideomycetes
- Order: Pleosporales
- Family: Neopyrenochaetaceae
- Genus: Neopyrenochaeta
- Species: N. annellidica

Binomial name
- Neopyrenochaeta annellidica W.J. Li, Z.H. Zhang & K.D. Hyde

Species of fungus

Neopyrenochaeta annellidica is a species of saprobic, hyaline-spored coelomycetes found on submerged decaying wood in freshwater habitats.

== Taxonomy ==
The species was first described in 2020 in a study revising coelomycete classification based on morphology and phylogeny.

== Description ==
The sexual morph of N. annellidica is undetermined.

The asexual morph features conidiomata, the fruiting structures of coelomycetes. The conidiomata are black when dry, dark brown when moist, and feature a white conidial mass surrounding the ostiole. The primary identifying feature of N. annellidica is the presence of pycnidial ("flask-like") conidiomata. The setae are pale brown to black, unbranched, and septate.

PDA cultures range from white to pale gray with white, undulate margins, with a dark brown center and white margins on the reverse side.

== Distribution ==
N. annellidica has been described in Thailand, Vietnam and Spain.

== Etymology ==
The species epithet, "annelidica", refers to its annellidic conidiogenous cells, which are a type of blastic condidiogenesis cells in mycology.
