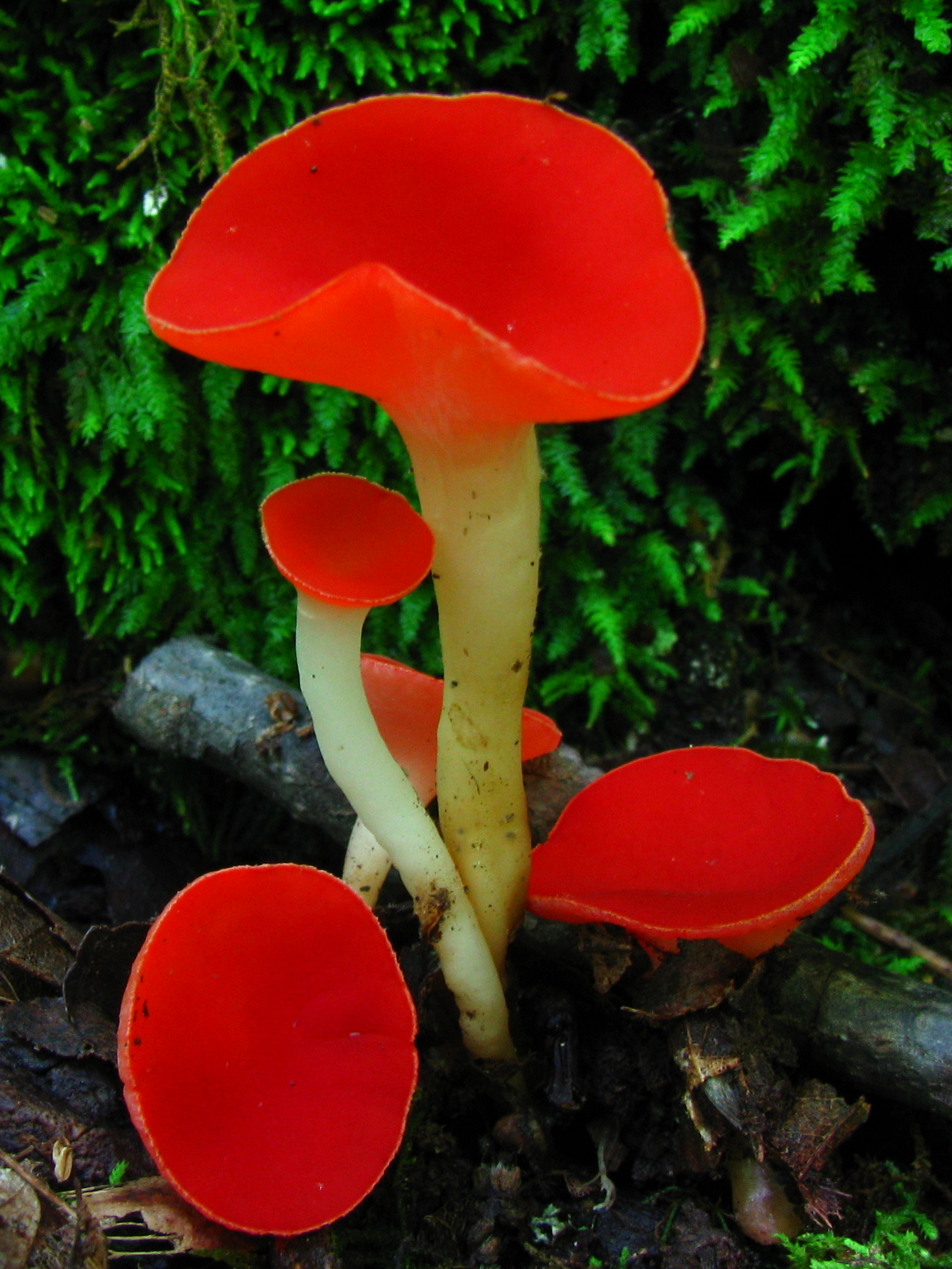

Scientific classification
- Domain: Eukaryota
- Kingdom: Fungi
- Division: Ascomycota
- Class: Pezizomycetes
- Order: Pezizales
- Family: Sarcoscyphaceae
- Genus: Sarcoscypha
- Species: S. occidentalis

Binomial name
- Sarcoscypha occidentalis (Schwein.) Sacc. (1889)

Synonyms
- Peziza occidentalis Schwein. (1832); Geopyxis occidentalis (Schwein.) Morgan (1902); Plectania occidentalis (Schwein.) Seaver (1928)

= Sarcoscypha occidentalis =

Species of fungus

Sarcoscypha occidentalis Mycological characteristics
- Smooth hymenium
- No distinct cap
- Hymenium attachment is irregular or not applicable
- Stipe is bare
- Ecology is saprotrophic
- Edibility is unknown

Sarcoscypha occidentalis, commonly known as the stalked scarlet cup or the western scarlet cup, is a species of fungus in the family Sarcoscyphaceae of the Pezizales order. Phylogenetic analysis has shown that it is most closely related to other Sarcoscypha species that contain large oil droplets in their spores. S. occidentalis has an imperfect form (reproducing asexually), classified as Molliardiomyces occidentalis.

The fruit bodies have small, bright red cups up to 2 cm (3/4 in) wide atop a slender whitish stem up to 1 cm (1/2 in) long. The species is distinguished from the related S. coccinea and S. austriaca by differences in distribution, fruiting season, and structure. The fungus can be found in North America and Asia. A saprobic species, it is found growing on hardwood twigs, particularly those that are partially buried in moist and shaded humus-rich soil.

== Taxonomy ==
The fungus, originally collected from Muskingum County, Ohio, was named Peziza occidentalis by Lewis David de Schweinitz in 1832. It was assigned its current name by Pier Andrea Saccardo in 1888. Andrew Price Morgan renamed the species Geopyxis occidentalis in 1902 because of a perceived similarity with Geopyxis hesperidea, but the name change was not adopted by subsequent authors. In 1928, Fred Jay Seaver overturned Saccardo's naming and applied the name Plectania to Sarcoscypha coccinea and other red cup fungi. In later taxonomic revisions, Richard P. Korf reinstated the genus name Sarcoscypha.

=== Phylogeny ===
The phylogenetic relationships in the genus Sarcoscypha were analyzed by Francis Harrington in the late 1990s. The cladistic analysis combined comparison of sequences from the internal transcribed spacer in the non-functional RNA with fifteen traditional morphological characters, such as spore features, fruit body shape, and degree of hair curliness. Based on this analysis, S. occidentalis is part of a clade of evolutionarily related taxa that includes the species S. dudleyi, S. emarginata, S. hosoyae, S. korfiana and S. mesocyatha. All of these species contain large oil droplets in their spores, in contrast to the other major clade of Sarcoscypha (containing the type species S. coccinea), characterized by having smaller, more numerous droplets. The species most closely related to S. occidentalis is S. mesocyatha, known only from Hawaii.

- - S. coccinea and four other Sarcoscypha spp.
  - - - - S. korfiana
        - - S. occidentalis
          - S. mesocyatha
      - - - S. dudleyi
          - S. emarginata
        - S. hosoyae

Phylogeny and relationships of S. occidentalis and related species based on ITS sequences and morphological characteristics.

=== Subdivision ===
A Jamaican variety has been named (as Plectania occidentalis var. jamaicensis); it has a pinker hymenium.

==== Anamorph form ====
Anamorphic or imperfect fungi are those that seem to lack a sexual stage in their life cycle, and typically reproduce by the process of mitosis in structures called conidia. In some cases, the sexual stage—or teleomorph stage—is later identified, and a teleomorph-anamorph relationship is established between the species. The International Code of Botanical Nomenclature permits the recognition of two (or more) names for one and the same organisms, one based on the teleomorph, the other(s) restricted to the anamorph.

The anamorphic state of S. occidentalis is Molliardiomyces occidentalis, described by John W. Paden. This form produces smooth, colorless conidiophores (specialized stalks that bear conidia) measuring 20–230 by 2–3.2 μm. The conidia are roughly spherical to ovoid, smooth, translucent (hyaline), and 4.6–7.0 by 3.0–3.8 μm.

=== Etymology ===
The specific epithet occidentalis, derived from the Latin word for "western", may refer to the distribution of the species in the Western Hemisphere. It is commonly known as the stalked scarlet cup or the western scarlet cup.

== Description ==
Depending on their age, the fruit bodies of S. occidentalis may range in shape from deep cups to saucers to discs in maturity, and they can reach diameters up to 2 centimetres (3/4 inch). In young specimens, the edges of the cup are curled inwards, and crenulate (with small rounded scallops); the cup edges in older specimens become laciniate (with jagged edges cut into irregular segments). The cups rest atop a stem that is small to medium-sized, up to 30 millimetres (1 1/4 in) long and 1.5–2 mm thick, and attached centrally or to the side to the underside of the cup. The base of the stem may be covered with translucent "hairs". The fertile spore-bearing inner surface of the cups, the hymenium, is bright red but fades to yellow or orange when dry. It is smooth or becomes so with time. The fruit bodies are fleshy to rubbery when fresh, but become leathery when dry. The flesh is thin and has no distinctive odor or taste, nor culinary value.

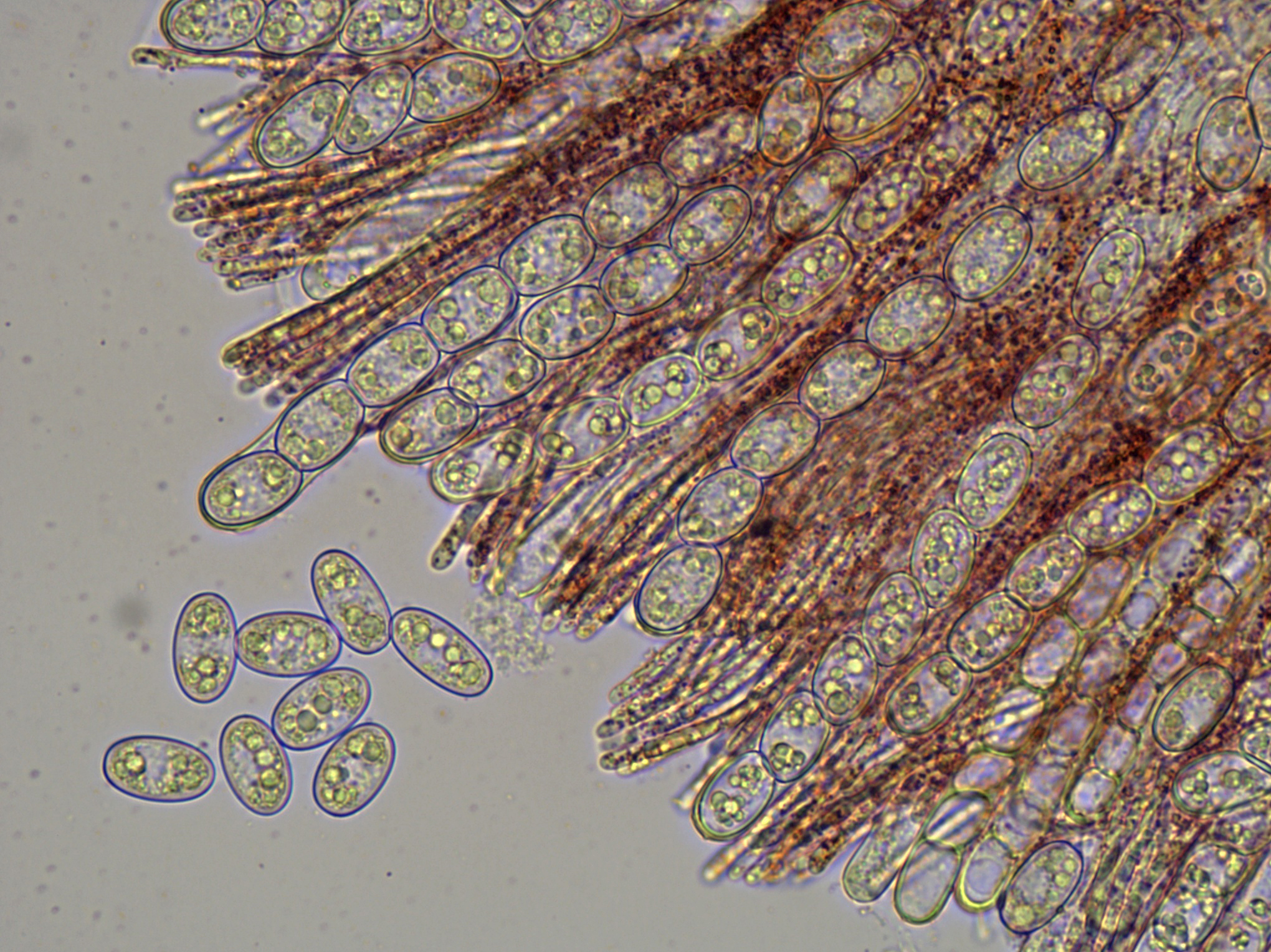
Micrograph of spores and asci

Excipulum is a term used to refer to the tissue or tissues containing the hymenium of an ascomycete fruit body. The ectal excipulum (outer tissue layer) is thin (20–30 μm thickness), made of a tissue type known as texura porrecta, consisting of more or less parallel hyphae all in one direction, with wide lumina and non-thickened walls. The medullary excipulum (middle tissue layer) is thick (200–600 μm) and made of textura intricata, a tissue layer made of irregularly interwoven hyphae with distinct spaces between the hyphae. The asci (filamentous structures in which the ascospores develop) are cylindrical with gradually tapering bases, eight-spored, and measure 240–280 by 12–15 μm. The ascospores have ellipsoidal to roughly cylindrical shapes, usually with blunt ends, and measure 19–22 by 10–12 μm. They have smooth surfaces and usually contain two large oil drops. The paraphyses (sterile, filamentous hyphae present in the hymenium) are cylindrical, 2–3 μm thick, barely enlarged at their apices, straight, and mostly unbranched above. They may sometimes anastomose, but do not form a conspicuous network. The paraphyses contain numerous red granules.

=== Similar species ===
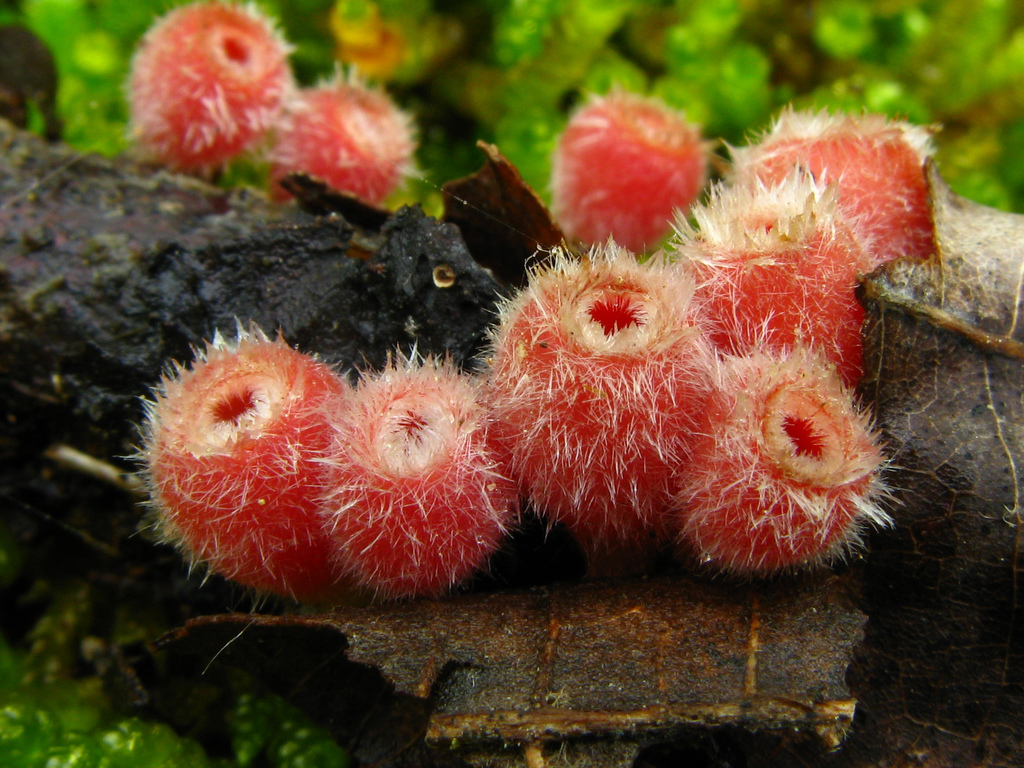
Microstoma floccosum

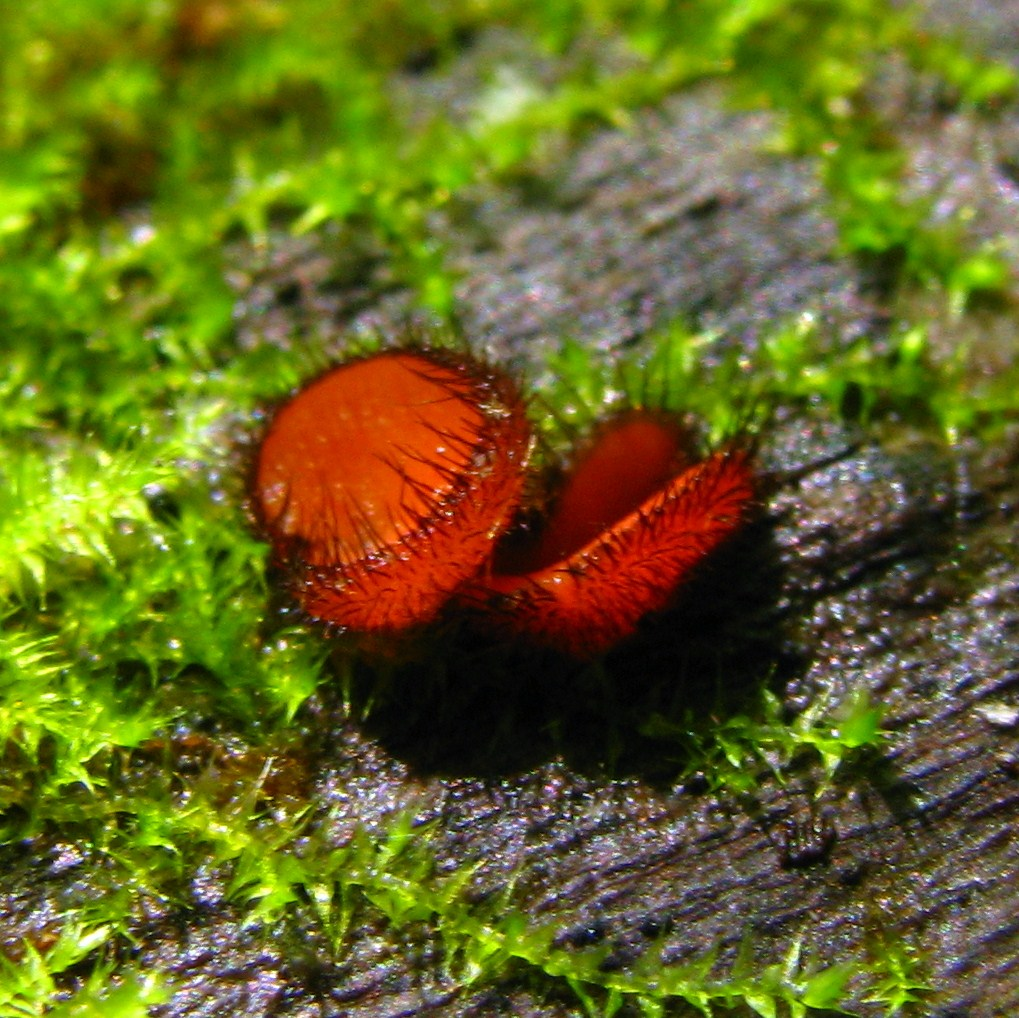
Scutellinia scutellata

S. occidentalis is frequently confused with S. coccinea, but is distinguished macroscopically from this species by its smaller fruit bodies, smaller spores, and less hairy exterior. The two also differ in seasonal and geographic distribution: S. occidentalis fruits from late spring to early autumn in the United States, while S. coccinea fruits earlier in spring, and is distributed in eastern North America, in the midwest, in the valleys between the Pacific coast and the Sierras and Cascades, as well as Europe, Africa, Australia, and India. Another eastern North American species, S. austriaca, has scarlet fruit bodies up to 6 cm (2 1/2 in) wide, and fruits in early spring.

S. occidentalis may also be mistaken for Microstoma floccosum, which occurs in the same habitat. M. floccosum, however, has taller cups and is covered with stiff white hairs. Another cup-fungus, Scutellinia scutellata, is disc-shaped without a stem, and is fringed with black hairs around its rim. Melastiza species usually lack stems and Phillipsia domingensis produces purplish or dark red cups with white undersides.

== Distribution and habitat ==
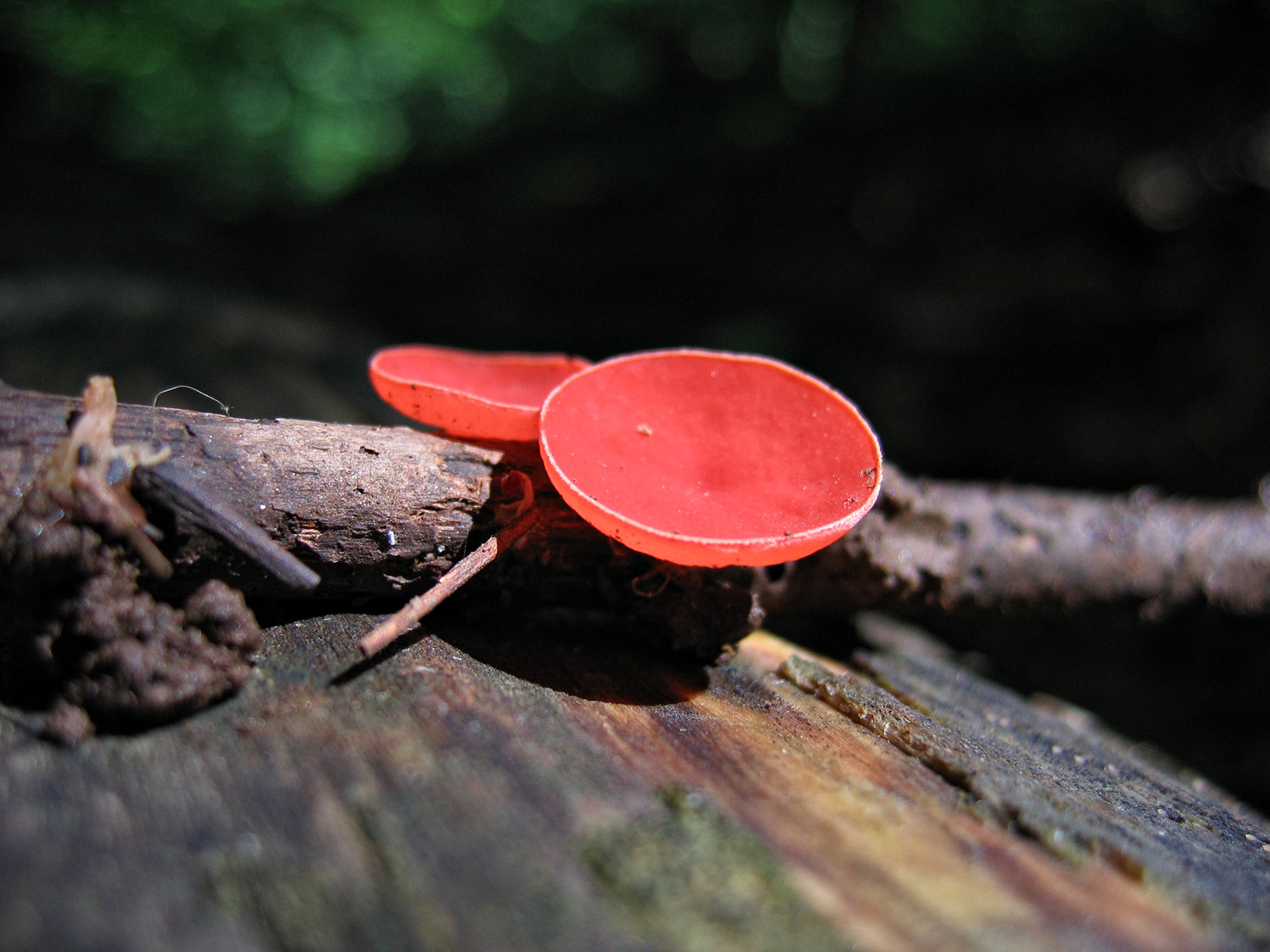
S. occidentalis grows on sticks and twigs.

The fungus is found in North America east of the Rocky Mountains, and at higher elevations in Central America and the Caribbean. It has also been collected in Japan and Taiwan.

As a saprobic fungus, S. occidentalis is part of a community of fungi that play an important role in the forest ecosystem by breaking down the complex insoluble molecules cellulose and lignin of wood and leaf litter into smaller oligosaccharides that may be used by a variety of microbes. Fruit bodies of S. coccinea may grow either solitarily, scattered or grouped together on sticks, twigs, and fragments of dead wood, usually somewhat decomposed and partially buried in the top 5 cm (2 in) of soil and forest litter. It prefers soil that is moist and shaded and has a high content of humus. Like all Sarcoscypha species, it prefers the wood of angiosperms, such as oak, maple, and basswood; one field guide notes a preference for shagbark hickory.
