= Pycnidium =

Type of fungal conidioma

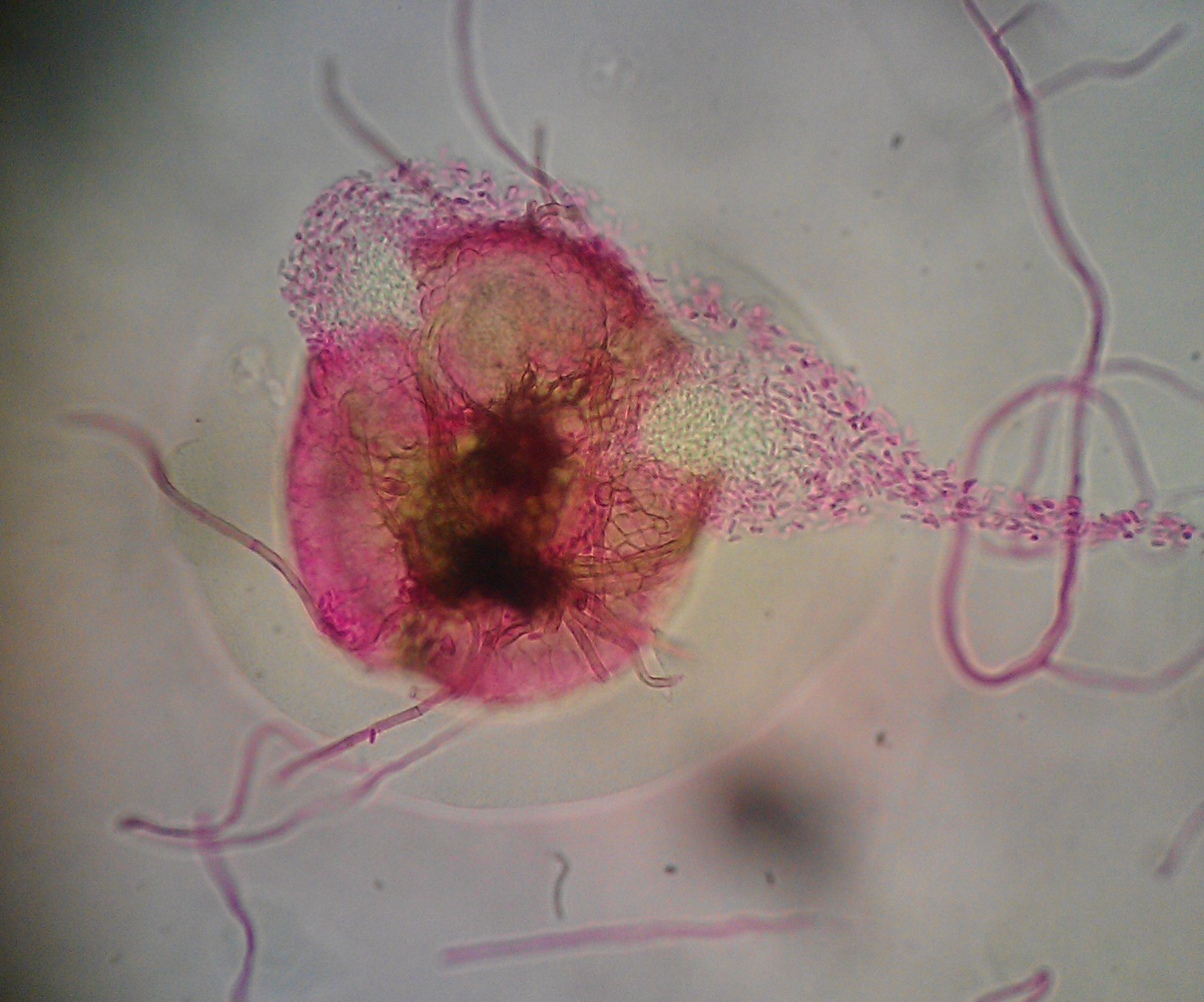
Pycnidium of a Phoma species releasing conidia

Pycnidium (plural pycnidia) is a type of conidioma, or asexual reproductive structure, found in many fungi, especially ascomycetes. It is typically globose to flask-shaped and contains spores (conidia) produced within an internal cavity. In many pycnidia the spores are released through a small opening called an ostiole.

Pycnidia are defined by their shape rather than by evolutionary relationships. Fungi producing pycnidia were historically grouped among the Coelomycetes or fungi imperfecti, but those form-groups are no longer treated as natural taxa in modern classification and nomenclature. In plant pathology, conidia formed in pycnidia are often called pycnidiospores. Pycnidia are diagnostically important in plant pathology and clinical mycology, and in lichenised fungi they may produce conidia with either dispersal or gametic functions.

== Terminology and taxonomic context ==
The word pycnidium derives from Greek pyknós, meaning 'dense', 'thick', or 'compact', with the diminutive suffix -ium. English-language use is recorded from 1857.

In older mycological literature, pycnidium-bearing fungi were commonly discussed under morphology-based groupings such as the Coelomycetes, especially when their sexual states were unknown or not emphasized. Older classification systems separated asexual fungi with pycnidia from those with acervuli, placing them in artificial form-taxa such as Sphaeropsidales and Melanconiales. These systems were practical rather than phylogenetic, and modern molecular work has shown that fungi producing pycnidia do not form a single natural group but are distributed across multiple lineages of Ascomycota. As a result, pycnidial morphology alone is no longer treated as sufficient evidence of close relationship. Modern nomenclature no longer permits separate formal names for different morphs of the same fungus; the older terms anamorph and teleomorph are still used descriptively, but no longer define separate naming systems. Pycnidium is accordingly a structural term, not the name of a natural fungal lineage.

Pycnidial fungi occur especially in orders such as Pleosporales, Botryosphaeriales, and Capnodiales within Dothideomycetes, and in Diaporthales within Sordariomycetes. Fossil pycnidia have been identified in plant material from the Cretaceous, indicating that this type of conidioma has existed for at least 90 million years.

The same Greek root pyknós appears in several related mycological terms. The term pycnidiospore remains common in plant pathology for a conidium formed in a pycnidium. Older general references also sometimes used pycnidium for the spermatia-bearing structure of rusts, but modern usage generally distinguishes the rust pycnium or spermogonium, a structure of Pucciniales in the Basidiomycota, from the pycnidium proper. Pycnidia produce mitotic spores for asexual dispersal and infection, while spermogonia produce gametic cells involved in plasmogamy. Many other compound words built on pycn- occur in mycological dictionaries, but most are specialised terms for particular structures or form-groups rather than names in broad current use for pycnidia themselves.

== Structure and morphology ==
A pycnidium is one of several conidiomatal types; others include the acervulus, sporodochium, and synnema. Pycnidia are commonly spherical, subglobose, pear-shaped, or flask-shaped structures with a central cavity. They may be solitary or aggregated, and they may be superficial, immersed in host tissue, or partly erumpent (breaking through) the surface of the substrate. Most have an apical ostiole through which conidia are discharged or exuded. Pycnidia may be unilocular or multilocular, and loculation is commonly recorded in taxonomic descriptions. Rare pycnidium-like conidiomata lacking a pre-formed ostiole have been termed cleistopycnidia; in the original proposal, these had a closed peridium and released endoconidia through one or more openings formed by degeneration of the peridial wall.

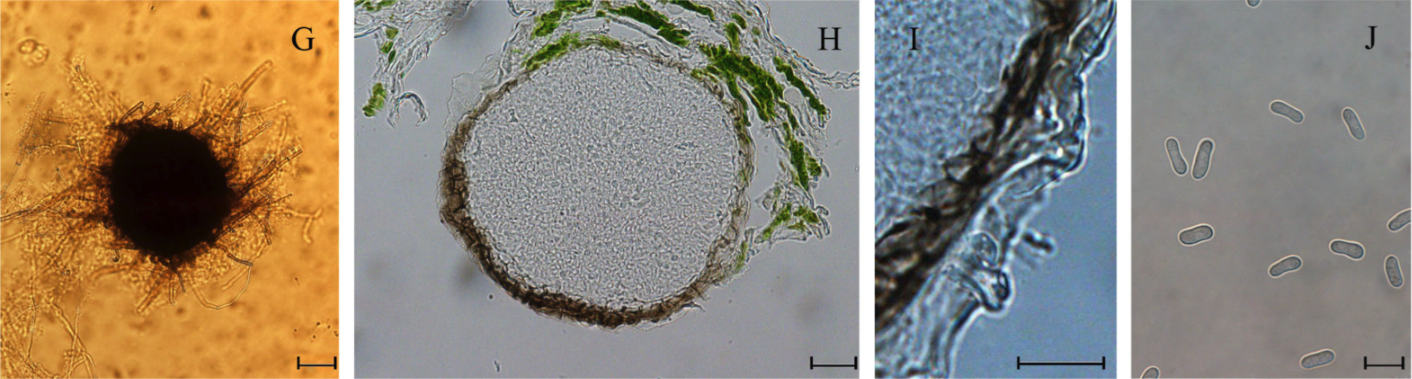
Microscopic characteristics of the plant-pathogenic fungus Sclerotiophoma versabilis: (G) pycnidium (H) section of pycnidium (I) section of pycnidial wall (J) conidia. Scale bars: (G) = 200 μm; (H) = 20 μm; (I,J) = 10 μm

The wall of a pycnidium is multicellular and commonly pseudoparenchymatous, meaning it is composed of fungal threads (hyphae) so tightly packed and interwoven that they resemble the solid, blocky tissue of a plant. The inner surface of the cavity bears conidiogenous cells (the cells that produce conidia), either directly or on short conidiophores. Conidia vary widely in size, shape, septation, pigmentation, and ornamentation depending on the fungus concerned. Pycnidia are typically microscopic, commonly ranging from roughly 100 to 500 micrometres in diameter, though the size varies considerably between species.

== Development ==
Classical studies distinguished two principal modes of pycnidial development: meristogenous and symphogenous. In meristogenous development, the structure originates from a single hyphal cell or a very small local group of cells that divide repeatedly; in symphogenous development, it arises from the interweaving or aggregation of several hyphae.

Developmental studies of Septoria showed that the pycnidial cavity may form both by cell separation (schizogeny) and by breakdown of central tissue (lysigeny). The ostiole differentiates relatively late, after the internal cavity and conidiogenous lining have formed. Classical work on pycnidial development also showed that pycnidia and acervuli can grade into one another morphologically.

== Function and spore release ==
The function of a pycnidium is to produce and release conidia. In many plant-pathogenic species, conidia are exuded from the ostiole in a mucilaginous mass or tendril, sometimes called a cirrhus, and are dispersed mainly by splashing or wind-driven rain. This makes pycnidia important in disease cycles that depend on repeated short-range dispersal during wet weather.

Because the spores develop within an enclosed cavity, the pycnidium also protects them during maturation. In some fungi, a single pycnidium may continue to produce successive crops of conidia rather than functioning only once. In a three-dimensional modelling study of the lichenicolous (lichen-dwelling) fungus Lichenoconium pyxidatae, a mature pycnidium was estimated to contain about 3,200 conidia when full, even though the internal cavity made up less than one-third of the total pycnidial volume, suggesting that the pycnidium is a highly efficient 'packaging' system for reproductive biomass.

== Pycnidia in lichens ==
In lichen-forming fungi, pycnidia commonly occur as minute dots or papillae on the thallus and are often useful diagnostic characters. They may produce larger conidia that function in asexual propagation of the fungal partner, or much smaller conidia often termed microconidia or spermatia.

Lichenological sources note that the exact function of these small conidia is not always known. Although they are widely interpreted as male gametes in sexual reproduction, neutral terms such as microconidia are often preferred when that role has not been demonstrated directly.

Pycnidia in the lichen Thamnolia vermicularis received particular attention after being rediscovered in modern material, following long neglect in later English-language literature. That study proposed that pycnidial conidia may help explain the lichen's broad distribution and low genetic differentiation.

== Comparison with similar structures ==
Pycnidia are often confused with perithecia because both are commonly flask-shaped and ostiolate. The critical difference is that a perithecium is a sexual ascoma containing asci and ascospores, whereas a pycnidium is an asexual conidioma containing conidia.

They also differ from acervuli, which are more open or erumpent conidiomata and do not enclose their fertile tissue in the same way as a typical pycnidium. Historical and developmental studies have noted that pycnidia and acervuli can grade into one another morphologically, which was one reason older form-taxonomic divisions later fell out of favour.

A separate source of confusion is the rust-fungal pycnium. Although pycnia are also flask-like, they belong to the sexual cycle of rust fungi and produce spermatia rather than asexual conidia.

== Importance in applied mycology ==
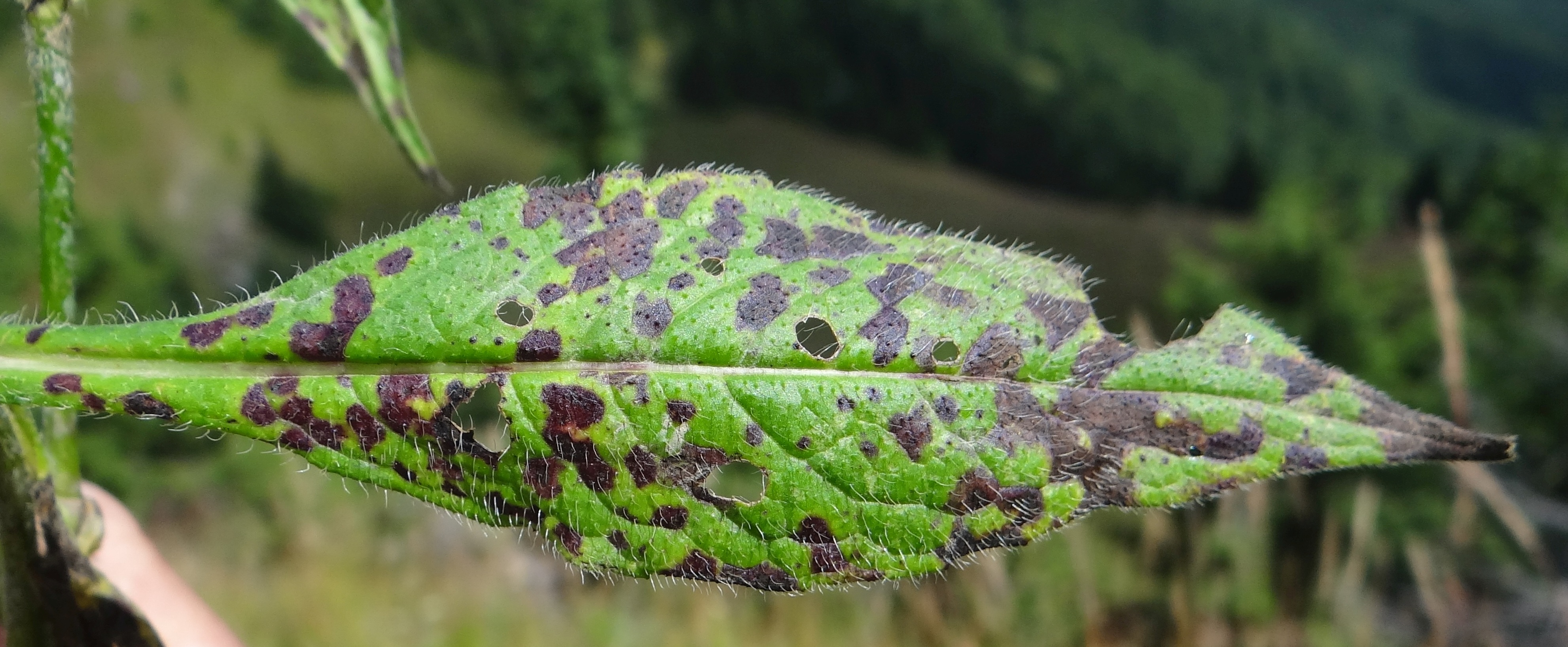
Leaf of Knautia arvensis with dark leaf-spot lesions caused by Septoria scabiosicola

Pycnidia are important in plant pathology because they often provide a readily visible diagnostic sign. In diseases such as septoria tritici blotch and other Septoria leaf spots, pycnidia appear as small dark specks embedded in lesions. Under moist conditions, conidia may ooze from the ostiole in gelatinous or hygroscopic cirrhi (spore tendrils), from which they are dispersed by rain splash. In some plant diseases, pycnidia also act as survival structures between growing seasons, allowing the fungus to persist on infected plants or crop debris; in Septoria diseases, for example, pycnidia protect conidia from desiccation and later give rise to conidia that serve as primary inoculum. Their presence is therefore useful both in field diagnosis and in understanding disease cycles.

They are also important in medical mycology. Reviews of human coelomycete infections note that these fungi are increasingly recognised in cutaneous, subcutaneous, ocular, and occasionally systemic disease, and that laboratory identification may depend on observing pycnidial or other conidiomatal structures in culture. Because unrelated fungi can converge on similar pycnidial forms, these reviews also stress the increasing importance of molecular methods alongside morphology.

Beyond their role in disease, the chemical environment within the pycnidium has attracted interest in biotechnology. The extracellular metabolites produced by these structures has been proposed for use in the eco-friendly biosynthesis of metal nanoparticles, especially silver and gold nanoparticles, for proposed applications in medicine, agriculture, environmental remediation, and catalysis.
