= Neopyrenochaeta =

Scientific classification
- Kingdom: Fungi
- Division: Ascomycota
- Class: Dothideomycetes
- Order: Pleosporales
- Family: Neopyrenochaetaceae; Valenz.-Lopez, Crous, Cano, Guarro & Stchigel
- Genus: Neopyrenochaeta; Valenz.-Lopez, Crous, Stchigel, Guarro & Cano, 2017

Genus of fungus

Neopyrenochaeta is a genus of fungi. It is the only genus in the family Neopyrenochaetaceae.

The following species are recognized in the genus:

- Neopyrenochaeta acicola (Moug. & Lév.) Valenz.-Lopez, Crous, Stchigel, Guarro & Cano
- Neopyrenochaeta annellidica W.J.Li, Z.H.Zhang & K.D.Hyde
- Neopyrenochaeta asexualis Magaña-Dueñas, Stchigel & Cano
- Neopyrenochaeta cercidis Jayasiri, E.B.G.Jones & K.D.Hyde
- Neopyrenochaeta chiangraiensis Z.L.Luo, W.J.Li & K.D.Hyde
- Neopyrenochaeta chromolaenae Mapook & K.D.Hyde
- Neopyrenochaeta fragariae Valenz.-Lopez, Crous, Stchigel, Guarro & Cano
- Neopyrenochaeta glabra Magaña-Dueñas, Stchigel & Cano
- Neopyrenochaeta inflorescentiae (Crous, Marinc. & M.J.Wingf.) Valenz.-Lopez, Crous, Stchigel, Guarro & Cano
- Neopyrenochaeta maesuayensis Z.L.Luo, W.J.Li & K.D.Hyde
- Neopyrenochaeta shaoguanica Y.R.Xiong, B.Xu, K.D.Hyde & Manawas.
- Neopyrenochaeta submersa Magaña-Dueñas, Cano & Stchigel
- Neopyrenochaeta telephoni (Roh.Sharma, Kurli, Sonawane, Shouche & Rahi) Valenz.-Lopez, Crous, Stchigel, Guarro & Cano
- Neopyrenochaeta thailandica Mapook & K.D.Hyde
- Neopyrenochaeta triseptatispora Mapook & K.D.Hyde
