= William Russel Dudley =

American botanist

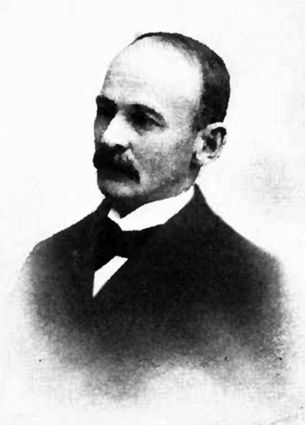
- Born: March 1, 1849; North Guilford, Connecticut
- Died: June 4, 1911 (aged 62); Los Altos, California
- Scientific career
- Fields: Botany
- Author abbrev. (botany): Dudley

William Russel Dudley (March 1, 1849 – June 4, 1911) was an American botanist. He headed the botany department at Stanford University from 1892 to 1911. His collection built at Stanford is considered to be one of the most important contributions to knowledge of the flora of California. This became the nucleus of what was known as the Dudley Herbarium.

== Early life ==
He was born in Guilford, Connecticut. He grew up on a farm, where he developed an interest in plants. He became a student at the new Cornell University in 1870, graduating in 1874, and paying his way by milking cows at the university's farm. His college roommate and future first president of Stanford University, David Starr Jordan (who later wrote an obituary for him in the journal Science), wrote of his demeanor, saying that Dudley was "a tall, well-built, handsome and refined young man, older and more mature than most freshmen, and with more serious and definite purposes." He studied natural history under Louis Agassiz on Penikese Island in 1875, and in the Harvard Summer School in 1876. In 1873 he became instructor of botany at Cornell, and in 1884 assistant professor of cryptogamic botany, and also professor of botany in the Martha's Vineyard summer institute during its sessions in 1878–79. He was appointed botanical collector for the university, received his master's degree in 1876, and was promoted to assistant professor of botany. In 1892 he took a position as head of the Stanford department of systematic botany.

His important published works include The Cayuga Flora (1886), A Catalogue of the Flowering Plants and Vascular Cryptograms found in and near Lackawanna and Wyoming (1892), The Genus Phyllospadix, and Vitality of the Sequoia gigantea.

He was an early forest preservationist, often consulting for US forester Gifford Pinchot, regarding developing national forests in California. He became an activist in the Sempervirens Club, devoted to protecting the coast redwood (Sequoia sempervirens), and was key to establishment of what is now Big Basin Redwoods State Park in the Santa Cruz Mountains. In 1901 the California Legislature passed an enabling act whereby 3,800 acres (1,500 ha) of land were purchased by the state in the next year to preserve the coastal redwood forest throughout the Santa Cruz Foothills area. Dudley was one of four men appointed to the first state board of commissioners. Big Basin Redwoods State Park was established in 1902, the first of many in that state created since then.

Dudley contracted an illness while studying trees in Persia. He contracted a severe cold or bronchitis in Egypt, and later died of tuberculosis in 1911, in Los Altos, CA.

In 1913, Stanford University published a "Dudley Memorial Volume" containing a paper by the then late Professor and appreciations, and contributions by friends and colleagues.

== Selected publications ==
- 1886. "The Cayuga Flora, Part I. : A Catalogue of the Phaenogamia growing without Cultivation in the Cayuga Lake Basin". (Ithaca, 1886).
- 1886. "Sketch of Curtis". The Journal of Mycology 2(5): 54–59. JSTOR 3752390
- 1886. "Elias Magnus Fries". The Journal of Mycology 2(8): 91–94. JSTOR 3753020
- 1886. "Charles Christopher Frost". The Journal of Mycology 2(10): 114–18. JSTOR 3752694

== See also ==
- William Russell Dudley Papers

== Eponymous taxa ==
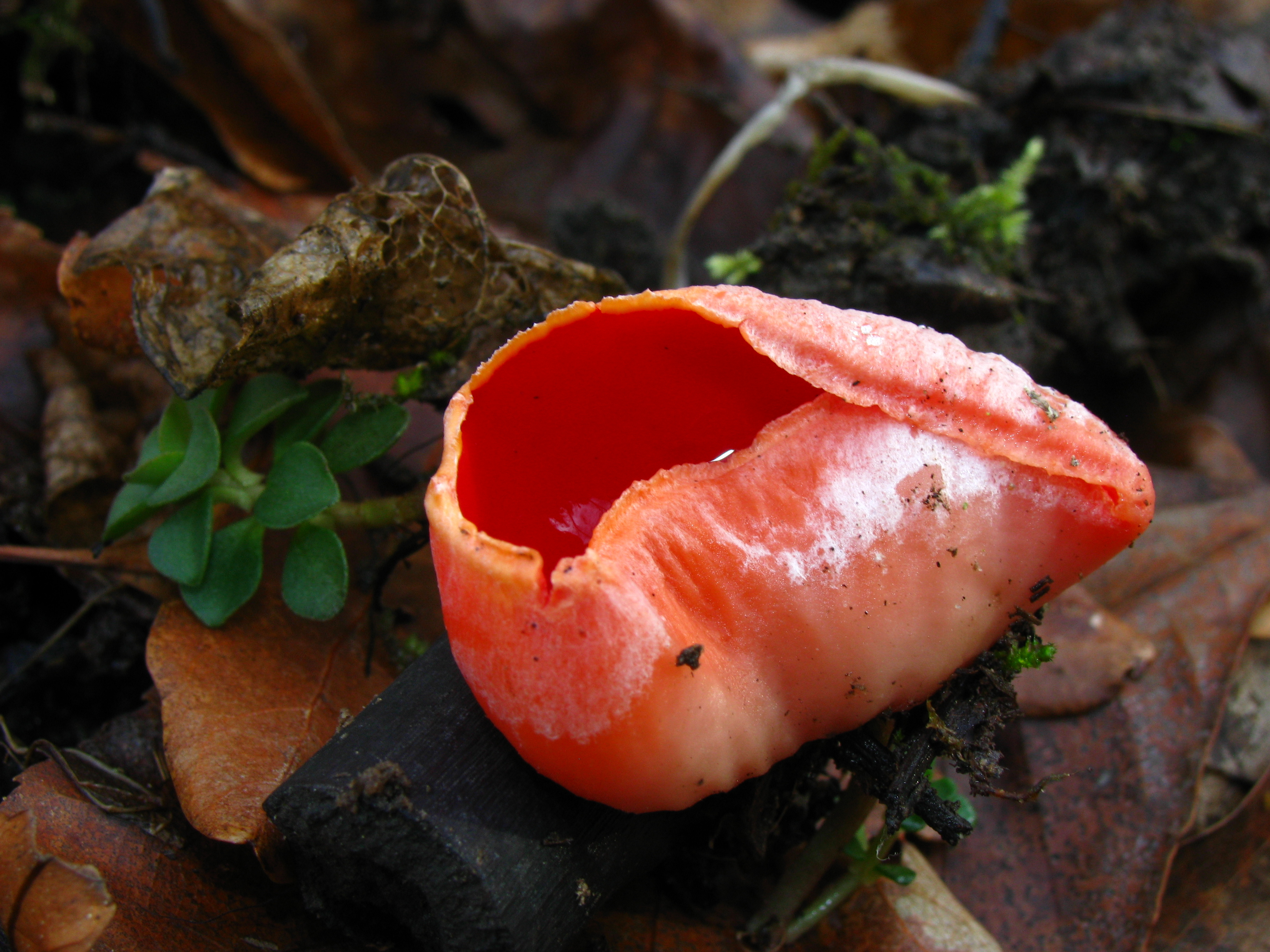
Sarcoscypha dudleyi

- Carex dudleyi Mack.

"Dudley's sedge", a monocot, is a perennial herb that is endemic to California.

- Dudleya

a genus of succulent perennials

- Juncus dudleyi Wiegand

"Dudley's rush" a rush

- Lecania dudleyi Herre

A lichen in family Ramallinaceae of the order Lecanorales.

- Lupinus latifolius Lindl. ex J. Agardh ssp. dudleyi (Rydb.) Kenney & D. Dunn
- Mimulus dudleyi A.L. Grant

"Dudley's monkeyflower", endemic to California.

- Molliardiomyces dudleyi F.A. Harr. 1990
- Pedicularis dudleyi Elmer

A dicot known as "Dudley's Lousewort"—a perennial herb that is endemic to California.

- Phacelia humilis Torr. & A. Gray var. dudleyi J.T. Howell
- Polystichum dudleyi Maxon

A species of fern known by the common name "Dudley's sword fern".

- Sarcoscypha dudleyi (Peck) Baral 1984

A species of cup-fungus in the family Sarcoscyphaceae of the orderf Pezizales.

- Triteleia dudleyi Hoover

"Dudley's triplet lily" or "Dudley's triteleia", a monocot, is a perennial herb that is endemic to California.
