= Sphaeropsidales =

Scientific classification
- Kingdom: Fungi
- Division: Deuteromycota
- Class: Coelomycetes
- Order: Sphaeropsidales; C.E. Bessey

Families
- Excipulaceae (Discellaceae); Leptostromataceae; Nectrioidaceae (Zythiaceae); Sphaeropsidaceae

Order of fungi

Sphaeropsidales is an order of Coelomycetes fungi.

These are conidial fungi where the conidia form in a growing cavity in the host's tissue. The fruiting structures are spherical with an opening at the apex (pycnidia).

Four form-families can be distinguished. Sphaeropsidaceae are fungi with pycnidia dark colored, leathery to carbonous, stromatic or non-stromatic generally provided with a circular opening. Zythiaceae are fungi with pycnidia as in the Sphaeropsidaceae but light-colored instead of dark, and soft or waxy instead of leathery. Leptostromataceae are fungi with hpycnidia shield-shaped or elongated, and flattened. Excipulaceae are fungi where mature pycnidia are somewhat deeply cup-shaped. In the family Sphaeropsidaceae, species of the genus Darluca are hyperparasitic on rusts while species of Cicinnobolus are hyperparasites of powdery mildew. Their mycelium is grown longitudinally in the mycelium of their hosts.

Members of this order can produce bisnaphthyl pigments, such as Sphaerolone and dihydrosphaerolone, or 2-hydroxyjuglone.
