= Agonomycetes =

Scientific classification
- Kingdom: Fungi
- Division: Deuteromycota
- Class: Agonomycetes; Ainsw.

Class of fungi

Agonomycetes are members of a taxonomic class within the phylum Deuteromycota and include anamorphic fungi.
