= Coelomycetes =

Scientific classification
- Kingdom: Fungi
- Division: Deuteromycota
- Class: Coelomycetes; Grove

Orders
- See text

Form-class of fungi

Coelomycetes are a form-class of fungi, part of what has often been referred to as fungi imperfecti, Deuteromycota, or anamorphic fungi.

These are conidial fungi where the conidia form in a growing cavity in the host's tissue. The fruiting structures are spherical with an opening at the apex (pycnidia) or are disc-shaped (acervuli). The formation of conidia in a fruiting body separates this group from the hyphomycetes, who have "naked" conidia.

Franz Xaver Rudolf von Höhnel (1852–1920), an Austrian bryologist, mycologist and algologist, was known for his contributions to the taxonomy of the Coelomycetes.

== Orders ==
- Melanconiales (producing spores in acervuli)
- Sphaeropsidales (producing spores in pycnidia)
