= Marin Molliard =

French botanist (1866–1944)

Marin Molliard (8 June 1866, in Châtillon-Coligny – 24 July 1944, in Paris) was a French botanist.

From 1888 he studied at the École Normale Supérieure in Paris, where he successively earned degrees in mathematics (1889), physics (1890) and natural sciences (1891). In 1892 he obtained his agrégation, and two years later became chef de travaux to the faculty of sciences at Paris. In 1922 he became a lecturer at the École Normale supérieure de Saint-Cloud, and from 1923 to 1936 served as director of the laboratory of plant biology in Avon. In 1937 he received the title of honorary professor.

In 1923 he was named president of the Société botanique de France. During the same year he was elected as a member of the Académie des sciences (section of botany).

In 1904 he was the first to describe conidia in the fungal genus Sarcoscypha. In 1984 John W. Paden introduced the generic name Molliardiomyces for the anamorphic states of Sarcoscypha and the related genus Phillipsia.

== Selected works ==
- Recherches sur les cécidies florales, 1895 – Research of floral galls.
- Nutrition de la plante (4 volumes, 1921–25) – Plant nutrition.
  - I. Echanges d'eau et de substances minérales.
  - II. Formation des substances ternaires.
  - III. Utilisation des substances ternaires.
  - IV. Cycle de l'azote.
