= Acervulus =

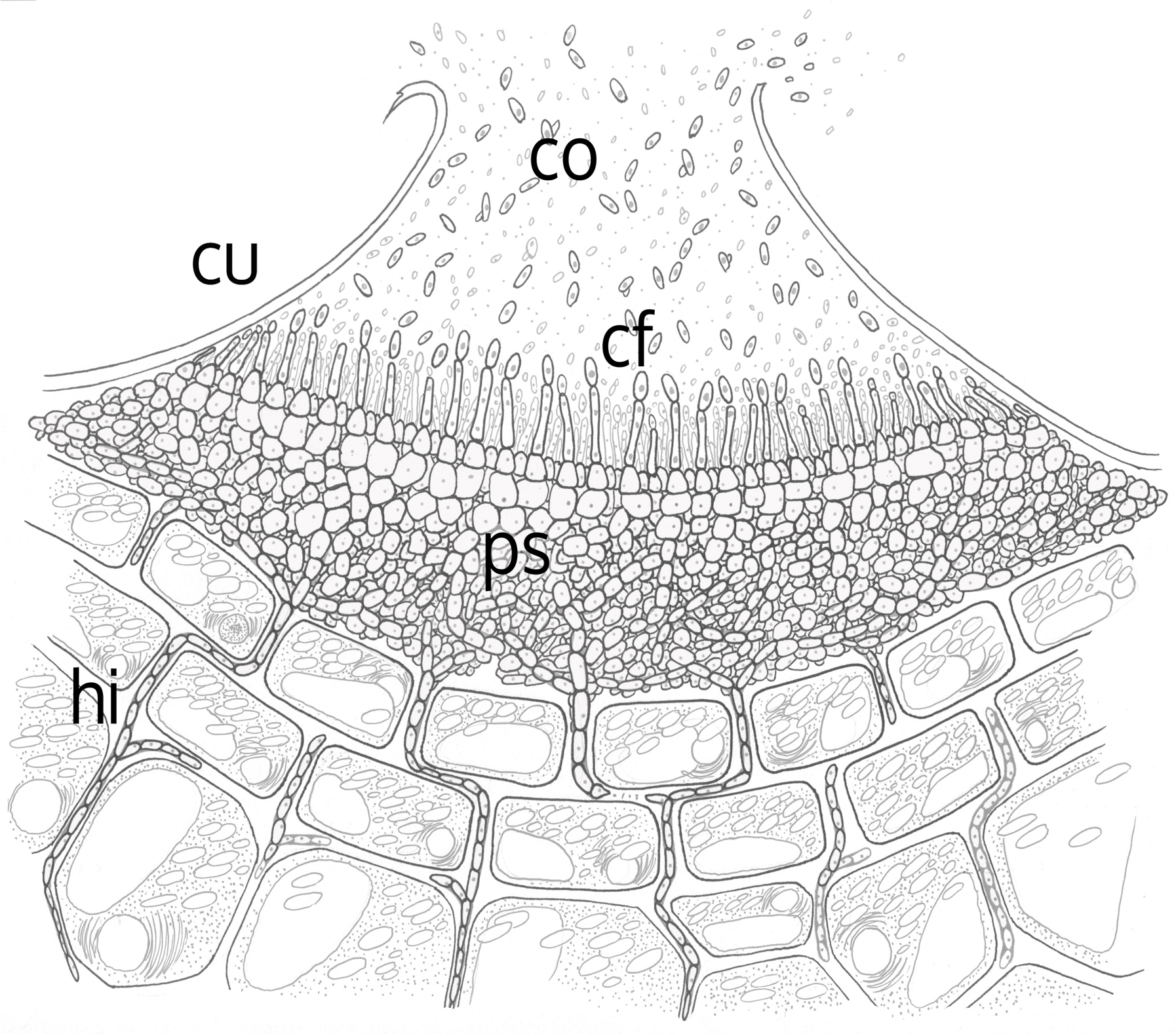
Acervulus morphology. cu: cuticle, co: conidium, cf: conidiophore, ps: pseudo-parenchymatic stroma, hi: hypha.

An acervulus (pl. acervuli) is a small asexual fruiting body that erupts through the epidermis of host plants parasitised by mitosporic fungi of the form order Melanconiales (Deuteromycota, Coelomycetes). It has the form of a small cushion at the bottom of which short crowded conidiophores are formed. The spores escape through an opening at the top.

== Sources ==
- Trigiano, Robert Nicholas, Mark Townsend Windham, Alan S. Windham. (2004) Plant Pathology: Concepts and Laboratory Exercises. CRC Press. pp. 11,129,137.
