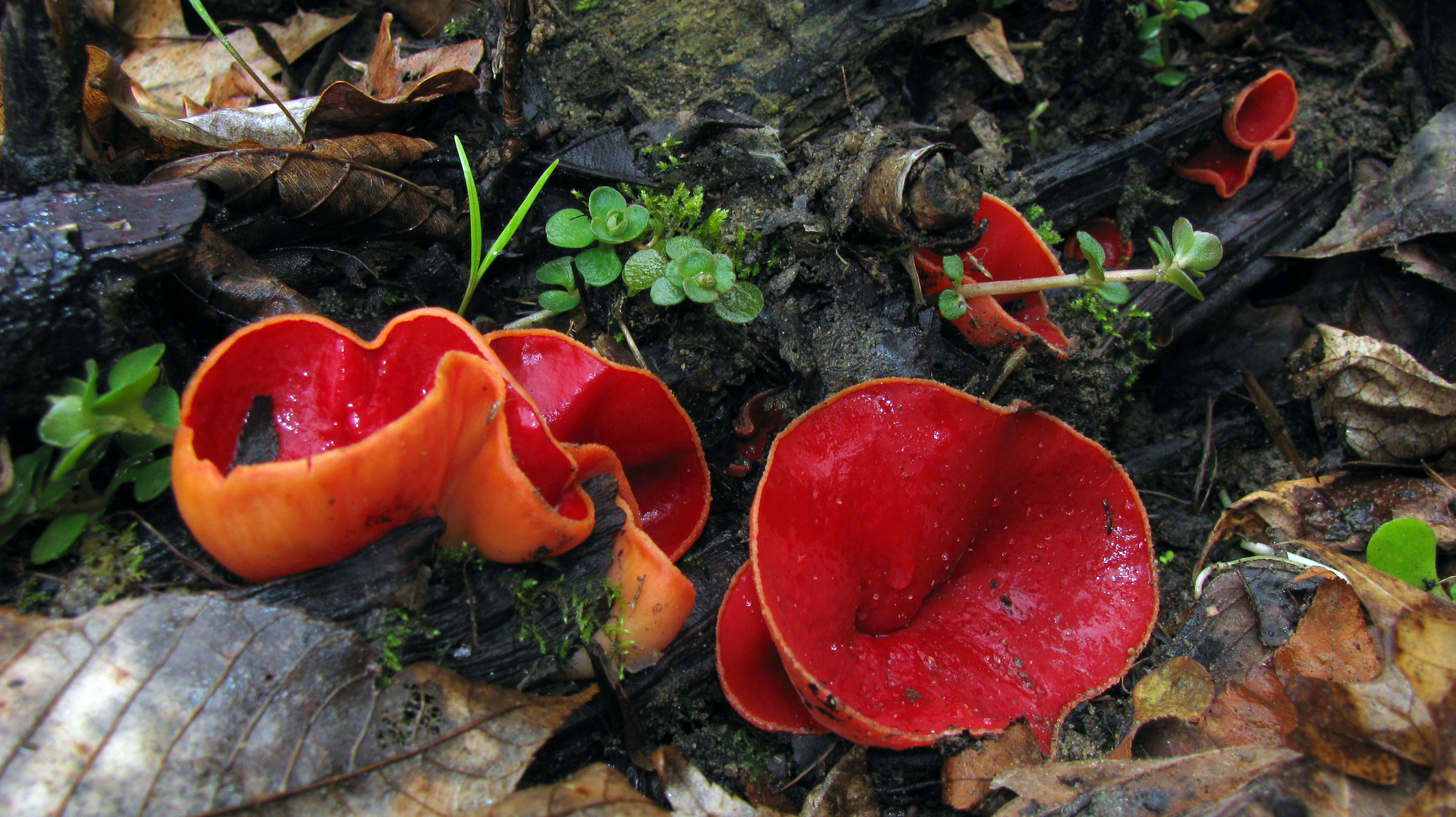

Scientific classification
- Domain: Eukaryota
- Kingdom: Fungi
- Division: Ascomycota
- Class: Pezizomycetes
- Order: Pezizales
- Family: Sarcoscyphaceae
- Genus: Sarcoscypha
- Species: S. austriaca

Binomial name
- Sarcoscypha austriaca (Beck ex Sacc.) Boud. (1907)

Synonyms
- Lachnea austriaca (Beck) Sacc. (1889); Peziza austriaca Beck ex Mussat (1901)

= Sarcoscypha austriaca =

Species of fungus

Sarcoscypha austriaca Mycological characteristics
- Smooth hymenium
- No distinct cap
- Hymenium attachment is irregular or not applicable
- Stipe is bare
- Ecology is saprotrophic
- Edibility is unknown

Sarcoscypha austriaca is a saprobic fungus in the family Sarcoscyphaceae of the order Pezizales of Ascomycota. It is commonly known as the scarlet elfcup, pézize écarlate and scharlachroter kelchbecherling. The species name means "from Austria".

== Distribution ==
This species is found in Europe and the Northeast of North America where it can be separated from Sarcoscypha dudleyi on spore characteristics.

== Description ==
This species is found growing on fallen pieces of dead hardwood among mosses and leaf litter in damp habitats in winter and early spring. The fruiting body is cup-shaped with a scarlet smooth, shiny interior. The exterior is covered with a felted mass of short hairs in varying shades of white and pink and a stubby stem. The flesh is white and rubbery with a thin red layer lining the cup. The spore print is white and the spores are ellipsoidal with flattened ends and containing several oil droplets. On the outside of the cup the hairs are curly or corkscrew shaped. These features distinguishes this species from the rather similar Sarcoscypha coccinea and Sarcoscypha jurana It is reported to grow on the dead wood of such hosts as Alnus incana, species of Salix, Acer and Robinia. It is part of a complex of species which includes Sarcoscypha coccinea and Sarcoscypha dudleyi.

Sarcoscypha austriaca is generally considered inedible, but is considered edible by the Norwegian Association for Mycology and Foraging.
