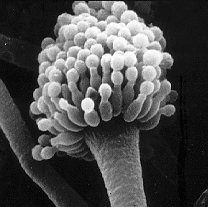
- Conidiophore of Aspergillus sp.

Scientific classification
- Kingdom: Fungi
- Division: Deuteromycota; R.T. Moore

Classes
- See below

= Fungi imperfecti =

Fungal classification based on asexual characteristics

The fungi imperfecti, also laterally called Deuteromycota, Deuteromycetes or imperfect fungi are fungi which do not fit into the commonly established taxonomic classifications of fungi that are based on biological species concepts or morphological characteristics of sexual structures because their sexual form of reproduction has never been observed. They are known as imperfect fungi because only their asexual and vegetative phases are known. They have asexual form of reproduction, meaning that these fungi produce their spores asexually, in the process called sporogenesis.

There are about 25,000 species that have been classified in the division Deuteromycota and many are Basidiomycota or Ascomycota anamorphs. Fungi producing the antibiotic penicillin and those that cause athlete's foot and yeast infections are algal fungi. In addition, there are a number of edible imperfect fungi, including the ones that provide the distinctive characteristics of Roquefort and Camembert cheese.

Other, more informal names besides division Deuteromycota (or class "Deuteromycetes") and fungi imperfecti are anamorphic fungi, or mitosporic fungi, but these are terms without taxonomic rank. The class Phycomycetes ("algal fungi") has also been used.

== Problems in taxonomic classification ==
Although Fungi imperfecti/Deuteromycota is no longer formally accepted as a taxon, many of the fungi it included have yet to find a place in modern fungal classification. This is because most fungi are classified based on characteristics of the fruiting bodies and spores produced during sexual reproduction, and members of the Deuteromycota have been observed to reproduce only asexually or produce no spores.

Mycologists formerly used a unique dual system of nomenclature in classifying fungi, which was permitted by Article 59 of the International Code of Botanical Nomenclature (the rules governing the naming of plants and fungi). However, the system of dual nomenclature for fungi was abolished in the 2011 update of the Code.

Under the former system, a name for an asexually reproducing fungus was considered a form taxon. For example, the ubiquitous and industrially important mold, Aspergillus niger, has no known sexual cycle. Thus Aspergillus niger was considered a form taxon. In contrast, isolates of its close relative, Aspergillus nidulans (Eidam) G. Winter 1884, revealed it to be the anamorphic stage of a teleomorph (the ascocarp or fruiting body of the sexual reproductive stage of a fungus), which was already named Emericella nidulans. When such a teleomorphic stage became known, that name would take priority over the name of an anamorph (which lacks a sexual reproductive stage). Hence the formerly classified Aspergillus nidulans would be properly called Emericella nidulans Vuill. 1927 – note there's no reference to the original author. The system since 2013 instead treats both as the same species typified by the anamorph, and hence the author citation would include the original author as Emericella nidulans (Eidam) Vuill. 1927

== Phylogeny and taxonomy ==
Phylogenetic classification of asexually reproducing fungi now commonly uses molecular systematics. Phylogenetic trees constructed from comparative analyses of DNA sequences (such as rRNA or multigene phylogenies) may be used to infer relationships between asexually reproducing fungi and their sexually reproducing counterparts. With these methods, many asexually reproducing fungi have now been placed in the tree of life.

However, because phylogenetic methods require sufficient quantities of biological materials (spores or fresh specimens) that are from pure (i.e., uncontaminated) fungal cultures, for many asexual species their exact relationship with other fungal species has yet to be determined. Under the current system of fungal nomenclature, teleomorph names cannot be applied to fungi that lack sexual structures. Classifying and naming asexually reproducing fungi is the subject of ongoing debate in the mycological community.

== Historical classification of the imperfect fungi ==
These groups are no longer formally accepted because they do not adhere to the principle of monophyly. The taxon names are sometimes used informally. In particular, the term 'hyphomycetes' is often used to refer to molds, and the term 'coelomycetes' is used to refer to many asexually reproducing plant pathogens that form discrete fruiting bodies.

Following, a classification of the Fungi imperfecti: Saccardo et al.(1882-1972)

- Class Hyphomycetes lacking fruiting bodies
  - Order Moniliales (producing spores on simple conidiophores)
  - Order Stilbellales (producing spores on synnemata)
  - Order Tuberculariales (producing spores in sporodochia)
- Class Coelomycetes spores produced in fruiting bodies
  - Order Melanconiales (producing spores in acervuli)
  - Order Sphaeropsidales (producing spores in pycnidia)
- Class Agonomycetes lacking spores

Other, according to Dörfelt (1989):

- Form-Klasse: Hyphomycetes
  - Form-Ordnung: Agonomycetales
    - Form-Familie: Agonomycetaceae
  - Form-Ordnung: Moniliales
    - Form-Familie: Moniliaceae
    - Form-Familie: Dematiaceae
    - Form-Familie: Stilbellaceae
    - Form-Familie: Tuberculariaceae
- Form-Klasse: Coelomycetes
  - Form-Ordnung: Melanconiales
    - Form-Familie: Melanconiaceae
  - Form-Ordnung: Sphaeropsidales
    - Form-Familie: Sphaeropsidaceae

Other systems of classification are reviewed by (Kendrick 1981).

== Common species ==
=== Industrially relevant fungi ===
- Tolypocladium inflatum → from which the immunosuppressant ciclosporin is obtained;
- Penicillium griseofulvum
- Penicillium roqueforti
- Penicillium camemberti
- Other species of Penicillium are used to improve both the taste and the texture of cheeses
- Aspergillus oryzae
- Aspergillus sojae
- Aspergillus niger
- Amorphotheca resinae
- Lecanicillium sp. → these produce conidia which may control certain species of insect pests
- Other entomopathogenic fungi, including Metarhizium and Beauveria spp.
- Pochonia spp. are under development for control of Nematode pests.

=== Important pathogens ===
- Magnaporthe oryzae, a rice pathogen

== Evolution ==
Many fungi imperfecti are unable to reproduce in a sexual way because of identified mutations that disable their ability to sexually reproduce, others may be sterile due to epigenetic changes. These kinds of changes can arise very quickly in laboratory conditions that force 10–19 generations of exclusive asexual reproduction. Female-sterile strains of Magnaporthe oryzae appear to have a selective advantage in the form of faster growth with more efficient conidia transfer.

Nieuwenhuis and James (2016) also discusses the costs and benefits for sexual and reproduction in fungi as well as mechanisms that have evolved to reduce the costs of either. They also describe the so-called "parasexual cycle" in some fungi imperfecti, which allows recombination without sex.

== See also ==
- Forest pathology
- List of mitosporic Ascomycota

== Bibliography ==
- Goos, R.D. (1956). "Classification of the Fungi lmperfecti". Proceedings of the Iowa Academy of Science. 63: 311–320 – via the Iowa Academy of Science, Inc.
- Gams, W. (1995). "How natural should anamorph genera be?". Canadian Journal of Botany. 73 (Suppl 1): S747–53. doi:10.1139/b95-318.
- Kendrick, B. (2 December 2012) [1981]. "The history of conidial fungi". In Cole, Garry T. (ed.). Biology of Conidial Fungi. Vol. 1. Elsevier. pp. 3–18. ISBN 978-0-323-13899-4.
- Seifert, K.A. (1993). "Integrating anamorphic fungi into the fungal system". In Reynolds, D.R.; Taylor, J.W. (eds.). The Fungal Holomorph: mitotic, meiotic and pleomorphic speciation in fungal systematics. CAB International. pp. 79–85. ISBN 0851988652.
- Taylor, JW (1995). "Making the Deuteromycota redundant: a practical integration of mitosporic and meiosporic fungi". Canadian Journal of Botany. 73 (Suppl 1): S754–9. doi:10.1139/b95-319.
