= List of North American boletes =

This is a list of bolete species found in North America.

Bolding of the species name, and an asterisk (*) following indicate the species is the type species of that genus.

== Aureoboletus ==
- Aureoboletus auriporus
- Aureoboletus gentilis
- Aureoboletus innixus
- Aureoboletus mirabilis
- Aureoboletus projectellus
- Aureoboletus roxanae

== Austroboletus ==
- Austroboletus betula
- Austroboletus gracilis
- Austroboletus subflavipes

== Baorangia ==
- Baorangia bicolor

== Boletinellus merulioides ==
- Boletinellus merulioides

== Boletellus ==
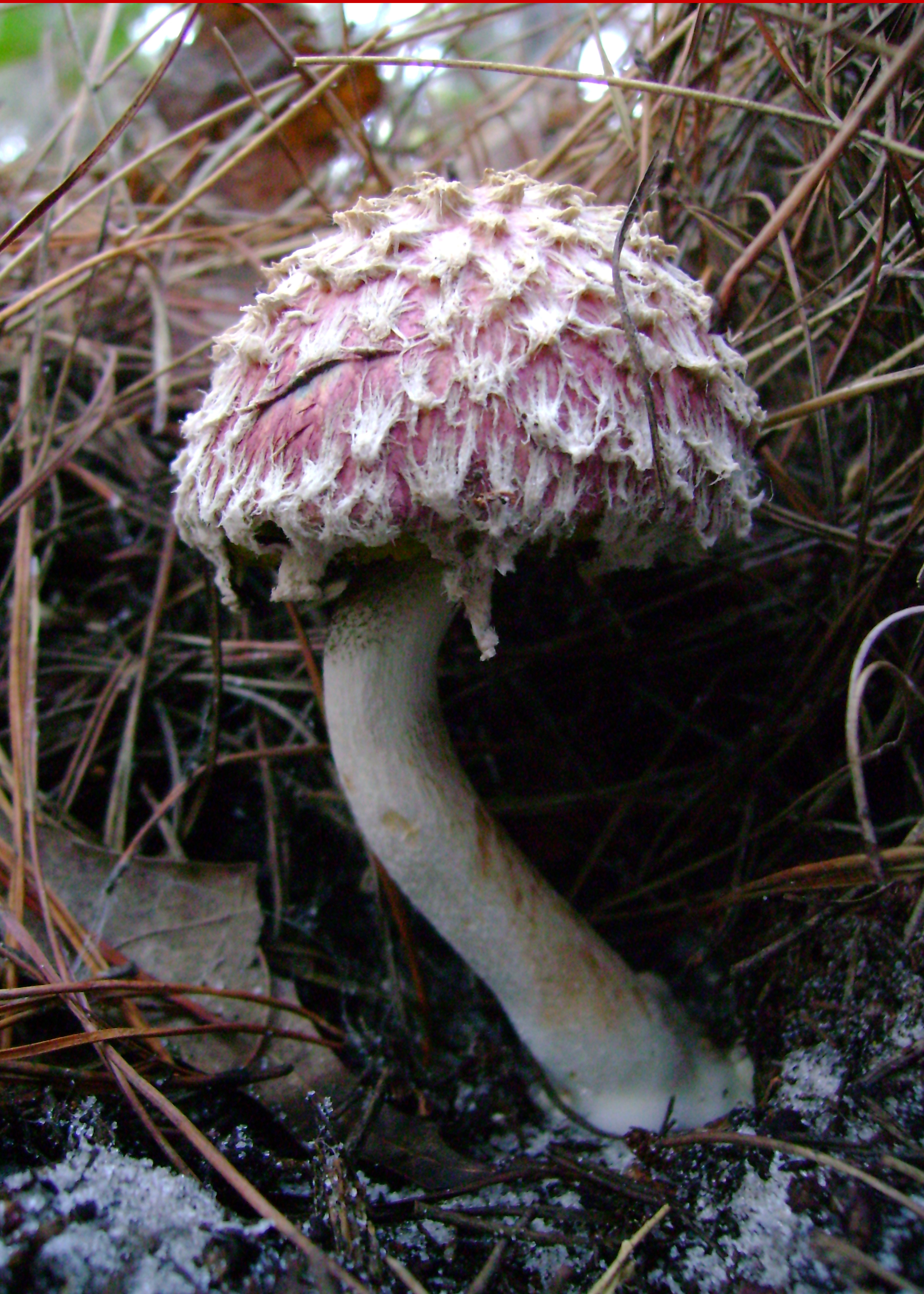
Boletellus ananas

- Boletellus ananas
- Boletellus chrysenteroides
- Boletellus flocculosipes
- Boletellus intermedius
- Boletellus pseudochrysenteroides
- Boletellus russellii

== Boletus ==
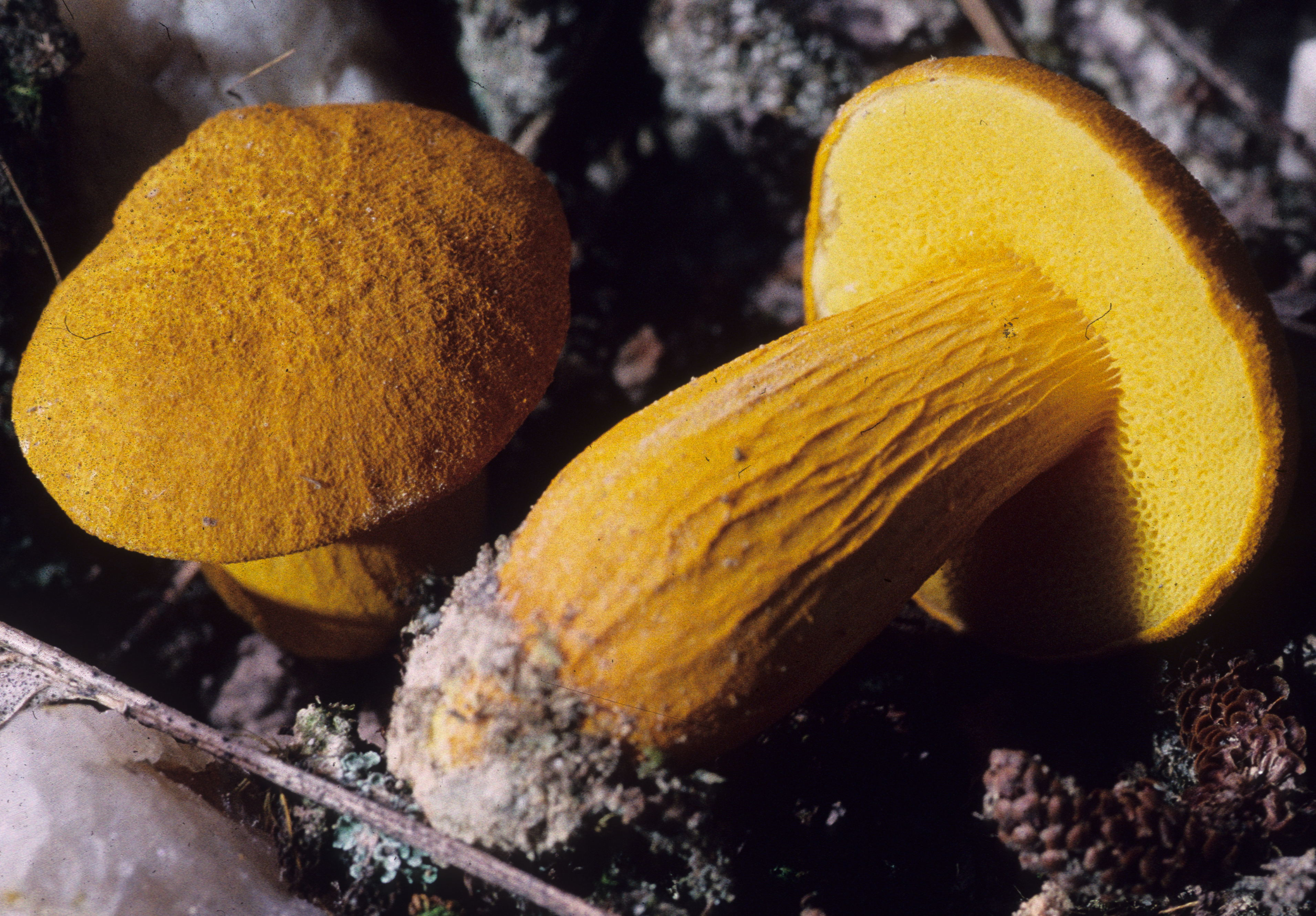
Boletus auriflammeus

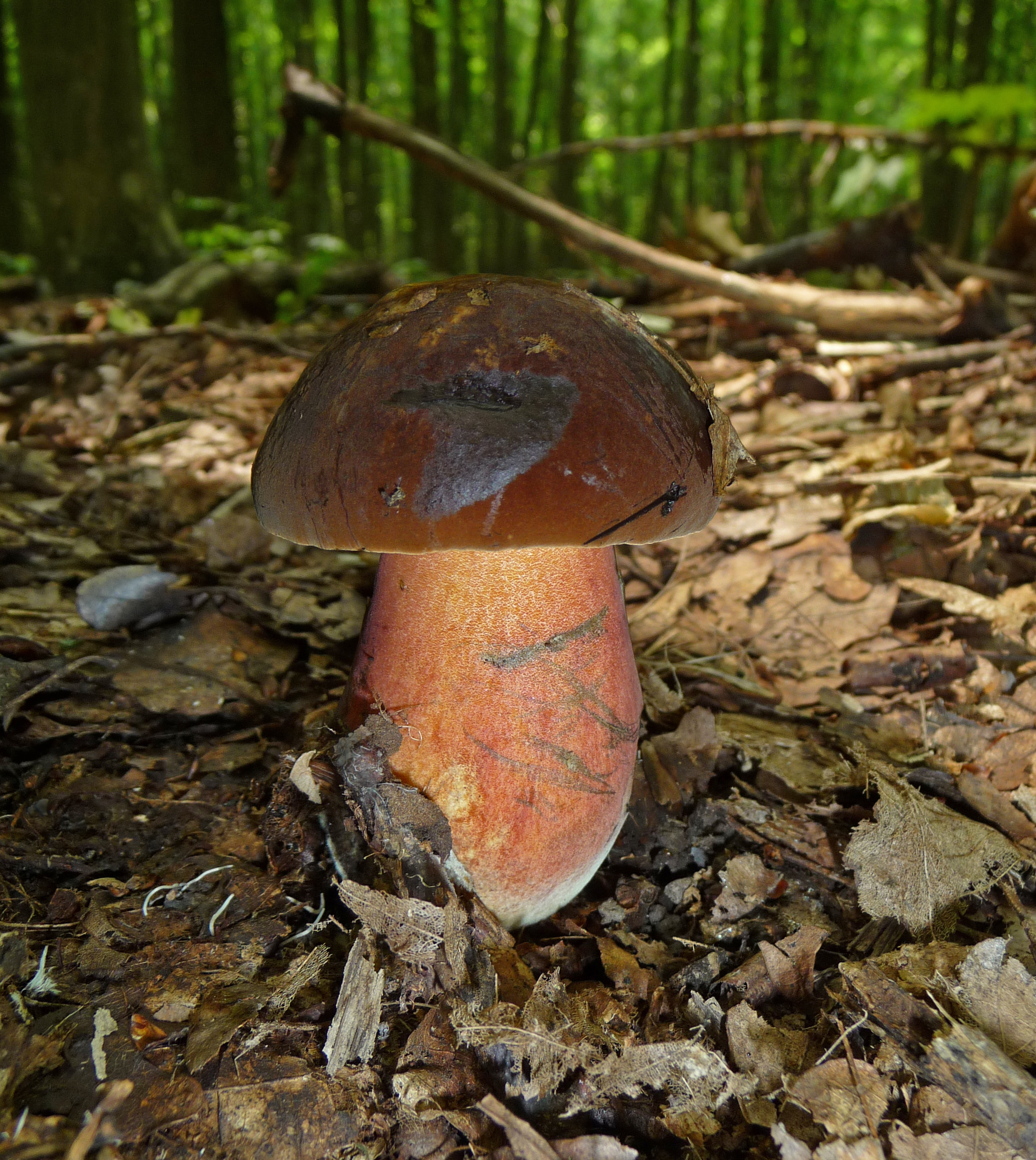
Boletus erythropus

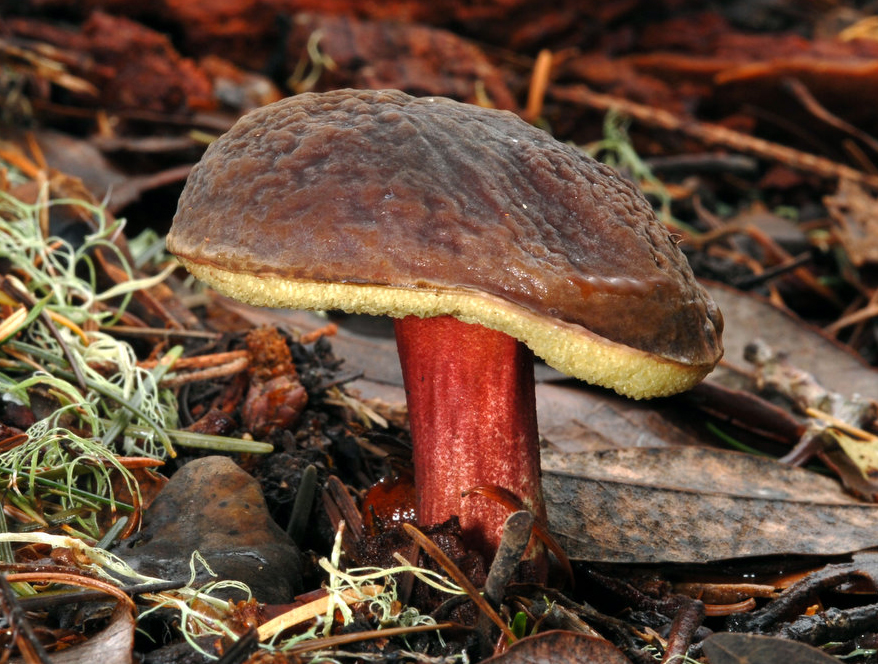
Xerocomellus zelleri

- Boletus aereus
- Boletus albisulphureus
- Boletus alutaceus
- Boletus amyloideus
- Boletus atkinsonii
- Boletus aurantiosplendens
- Boletus aureissimus
- Boletus auriflammeus
- Boletus auripes
- Boletus auriporus
- Boletus austrinus – Mexico
- Boletus barrowsii
- Boletus bicoloroides
- Boletus carminiporus
- Boletus citriniporus
- Boletus coniferarum
- Boletus curtisii
- Boletus discolor
- Boletus dryophilus
- Boletus edulis *
- Boletus fagicola
- Boletus fairchildianus
- Boletus fibrillosus
- Boletus flammans
- Boletus flaviporus
- Boletus flavissimus – Mexico
- Boletus fraternus
- Boletus gentilis
- Boletus gertrudiae
- Boletus glabellus
- Boletus griseus
- Boletus harrisonii
- Boletus hematinus
- Boletus hemichrysus
- Boletus holoxanthus
- Boletus hortonii
- Boletus huronensis
- Boletus hypocarycinus
- Boletus hypoxanthus
- Boletus insuetus
- Boletus lewisii
- Boletus lignicola
- Boletus longicurvipes
- Boletus luridellus
- Boletus mahogonicolor
- Boletus melleoluteus
- Boletus miniato-olivaceus
- Boletus miniato-pallescens
- Boletus morrisii
- Boletus mottiae
- Boletus nobilis
- Boletus nobilissimus
- Boletus ochraceoluteus
- Boletus oliveisporus
- Boletus ornatipes
- Boletus pallidoroseus
- Boletus pallidus
- Boletus patrioticus
- Boletus pinophilus
- Boletus pseudoboletinus
- Boletus pseudo-olivaceus
- Boletus pseudopeckii
- Boletus pulchriceps
- Boletus purpureorubellus
- Boletus reticulatus
- Boletus roodyi
- Boletus roseipes
- Boletus roseolateritius
- Boletus roseopurpureus
- Boletus rubriceps
- Boletus rubricitrinus
- Boletus rubroflammeus
- Boletus rubropunctus
- Boletus rufocinnamomeus
- Boletus rufomaculatus
- Boletus sensibilis
- Boletus separans
- Boletus smithii
- Boletus spadiceus
- Boletus speciosus
- Boletus sphaerocephalus
- Boletus subcaerulescens
- Boletus subdepauperatus
- Boletus subfraternus
- Boletus subgraveolens
- Boletus subluridellus
- Boletus subluridus
- Boletus subvelutipes
- Boletus truncatus
- Boletus variipes
- Boletus vermiculosoides
- Boletus vermiculosus
- Boletus viscidocurrugis

== Butyriboletus ==
- Butyriboletus abieticola
- Butyriboletus appendiculatus
- Butyriboletus autumniregius
- Butyriboletus persolidus
- Butyriboletus primiregius
- Butyriboletus querciregius
- Butyriboletus regius

== Caloboletus ==
- Caloboletus calopus
- Caloboletus conifericola
- Caloboletus firmus
- Caloboletus frustosus
- Caloboletus inedulis
- Caloboletus marshii
- Caloboletus peckii
- Caloboletus rubripes

== Chalciporus ==
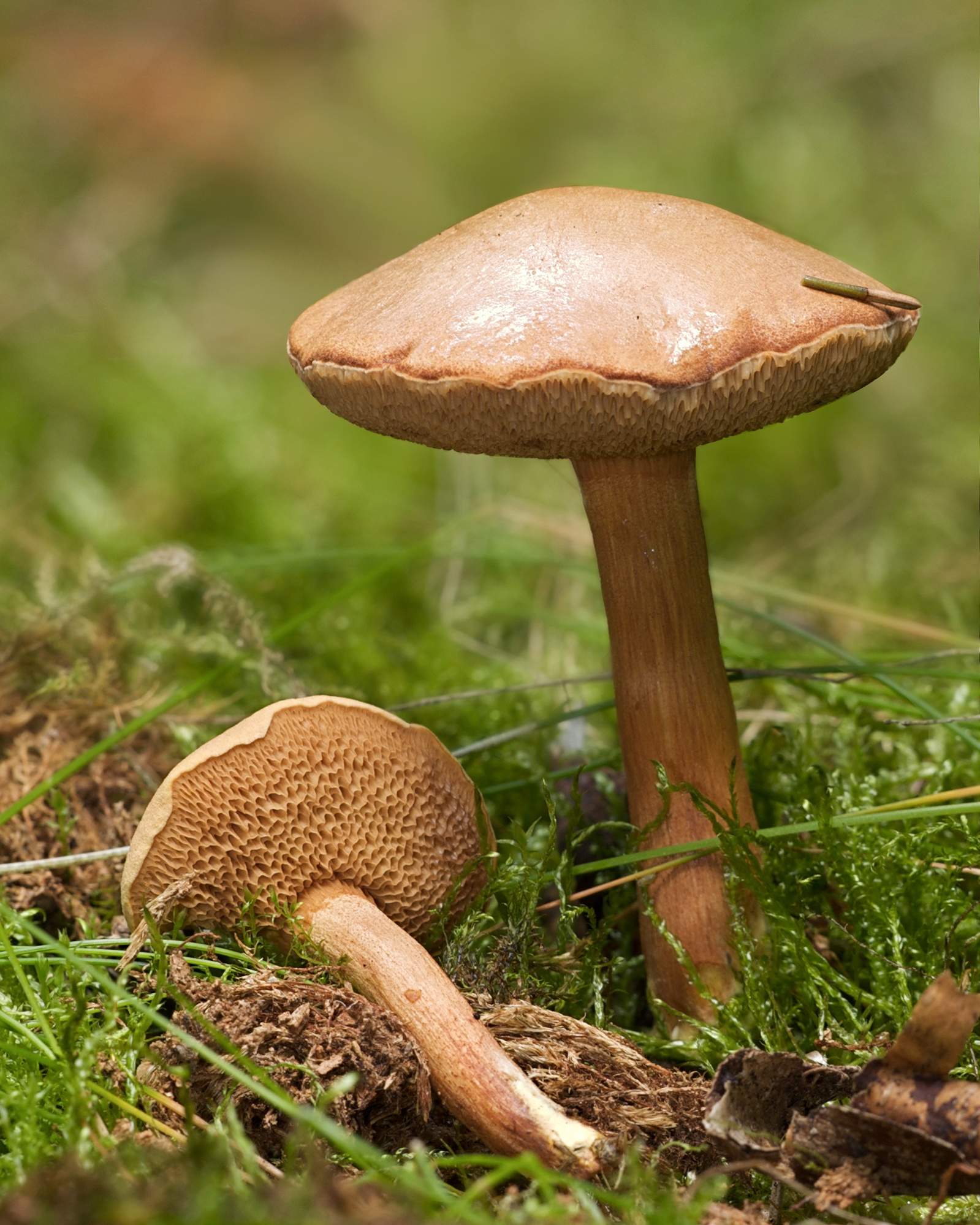
Chalciporus piperatus

- Chalciporus piperatoides
- Chalciporus piperatus
- Chalciporus pseudorubinellus
- Chalciporus rubinellus
- Chalciporus rubritubifer

== Cyanoboletus ==
- Cyanoboletus pulverulentus
- Cyanoboletus rainisii

== Exsudoporus ==
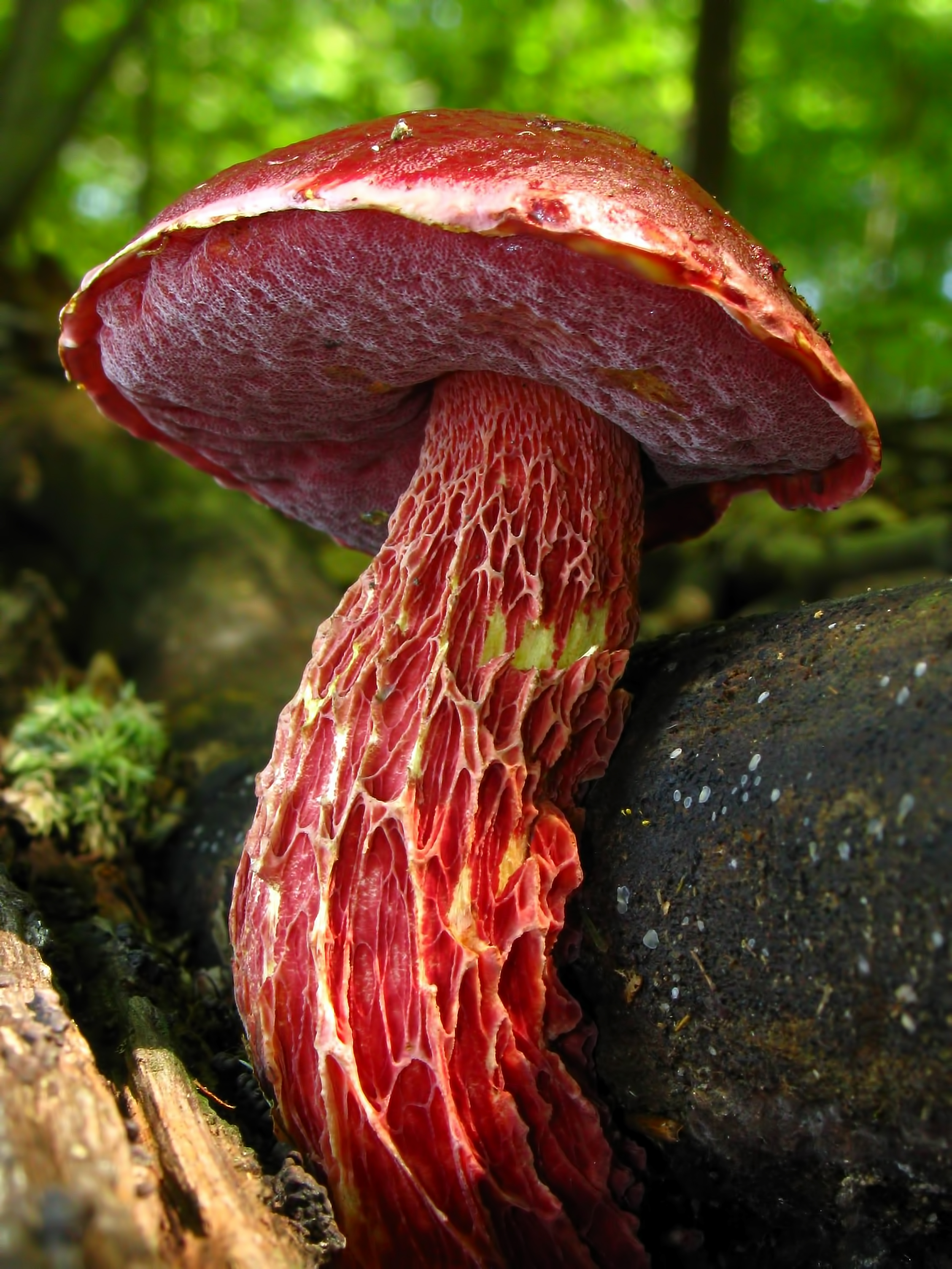
Exsudoporus frostii

- Exsudoporus floridanus
- Exsudoporus frostii

== Fistulinella ==
- Fistulinella mexicana – Mexico

== Fuscoboletinus ==
- Fuscoboletinus glandulosus
- Fuscoboletinus grisellus
- Fuscoboletinus laricinus
- Fuscoboletinus ochraceoroseus
- Fuscoboletinus paluster
- Fuscoboletinus serotinus
- Fuscoboletinus spectabilis

== Gastroboletus ==
- Gastroboletus citrinobrunneus
- Gastroboletus ruber
- Gastroboletus subalpinus
- Gastroboletus turbinatus
- Gastroboletus xerocomoides

== Gastroleccinum ==
- Gastroleccinum scabrosum

== Gastrosuillus ==
- Gastrosuillus larinius

== Gyrodon ==
- Gyrodon lividus
- Gyrodon merulioides
- Gyrodon monticola – Mexico
- Gyrodon proximus
- Gyrodon rompelii

== Gyroporus ==
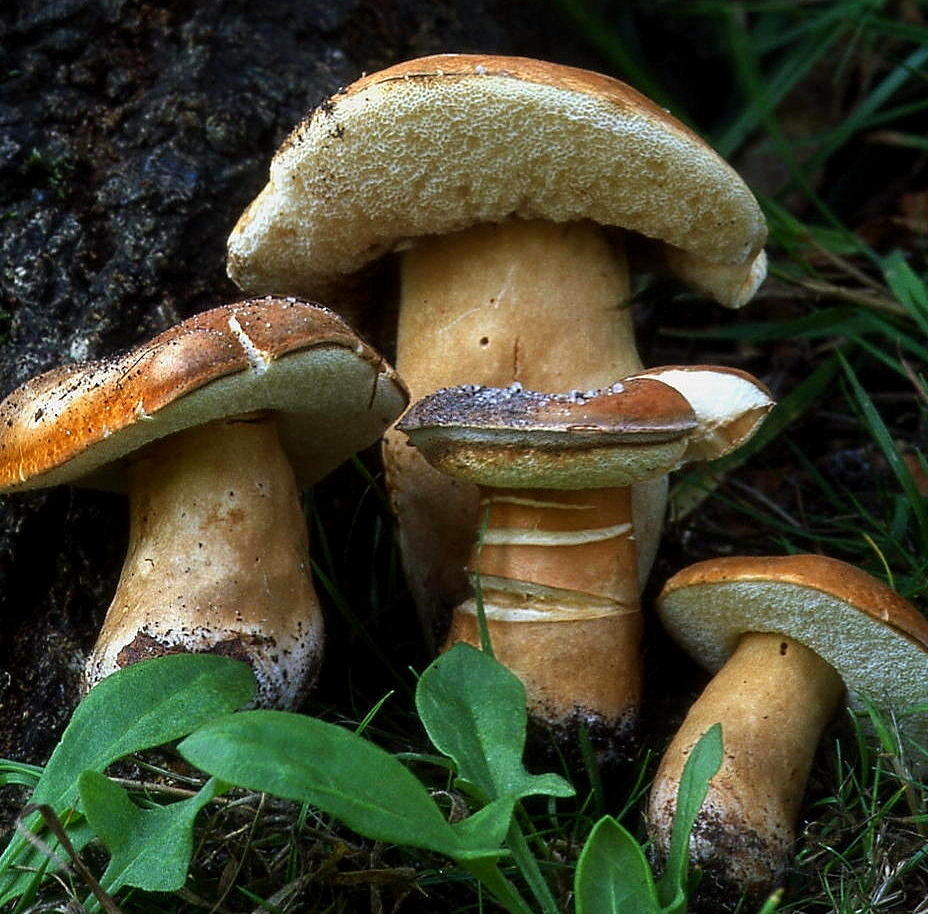
Gyroporus castaneus

- Gyroporus castaneus
- Gyroporus cyanescens
- Gyroporus phaeocyanescens
- Gyroporus purpurinus
- Gyroporus subalbellus
- Gyroporus umbrinosquamosus – Mexico

== Heimioporus ==
- Heimioporus betula

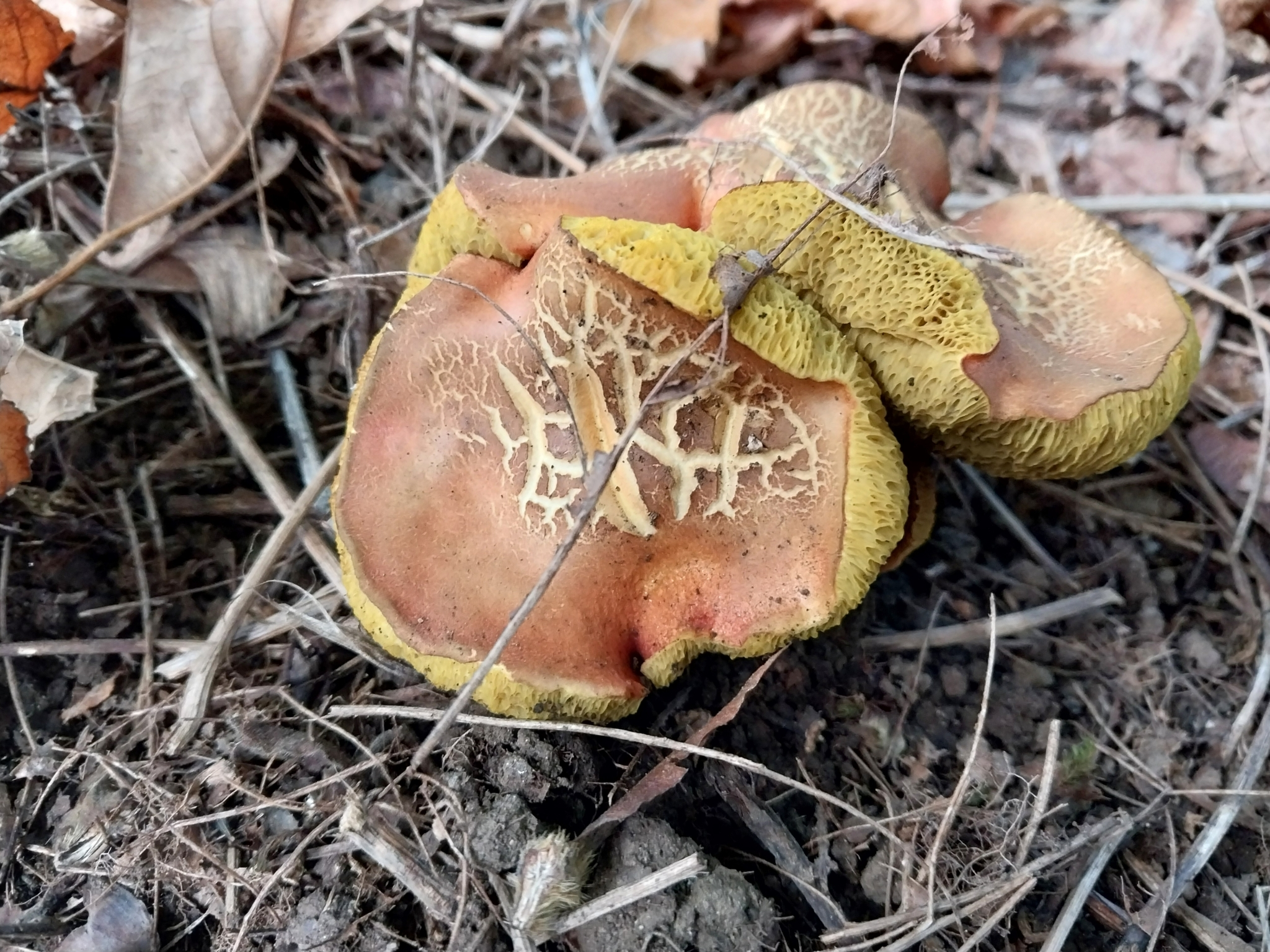
Hortiboletus coccyginus

== Hemileccinum ==
- Hemileccinum subglabripes

== Hortiboletus ==
- Hortiboletus campestris
- Hortiboletus coccyginus
- Hortiboletus rubellus

== Imleria ==
- Imleria badia

== Lanmaoa ==
- Lanmaoa borealis
- Lanmaoa carminipes
- Lanmaoa pallidorosea
- Lanmaoa pseudosensibilis
- Lanmaoa roseocrispans
- Lanmaoa sublurida

== Leccinum ==
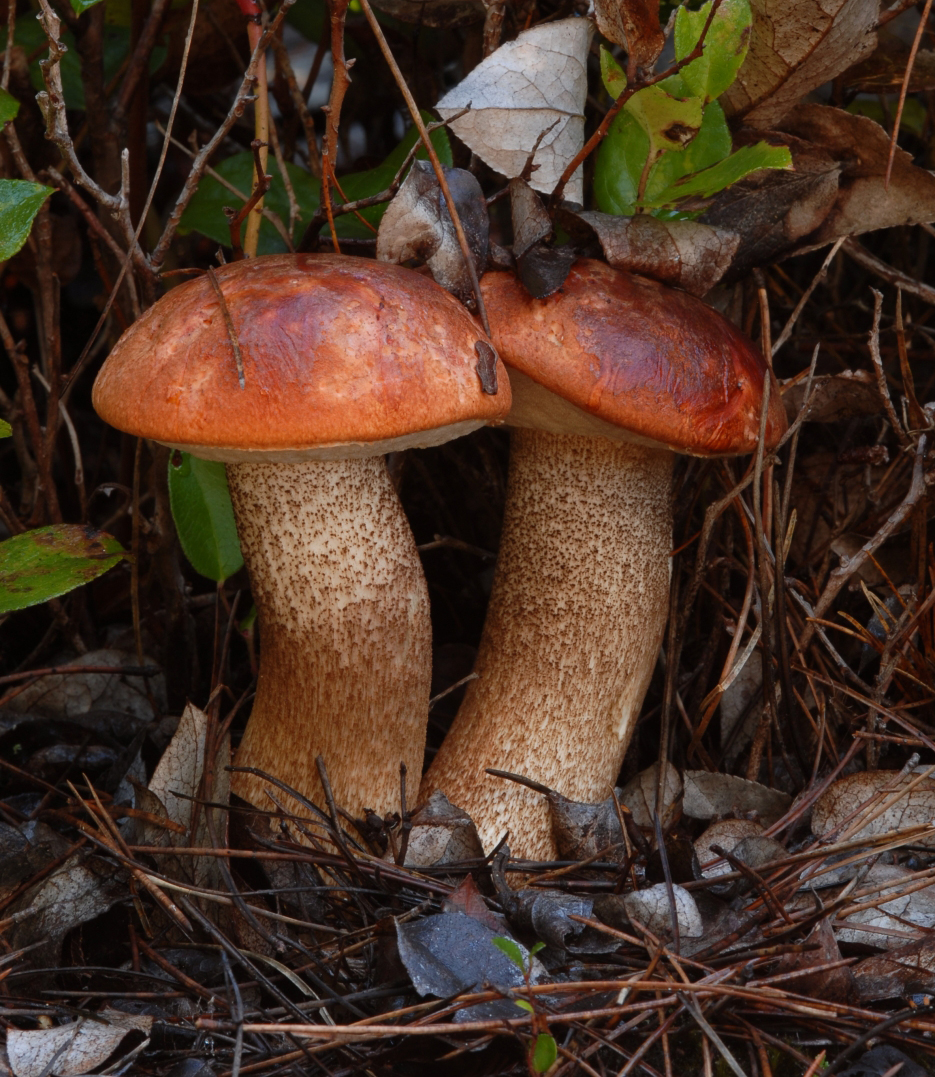
Leccinum manzanitae

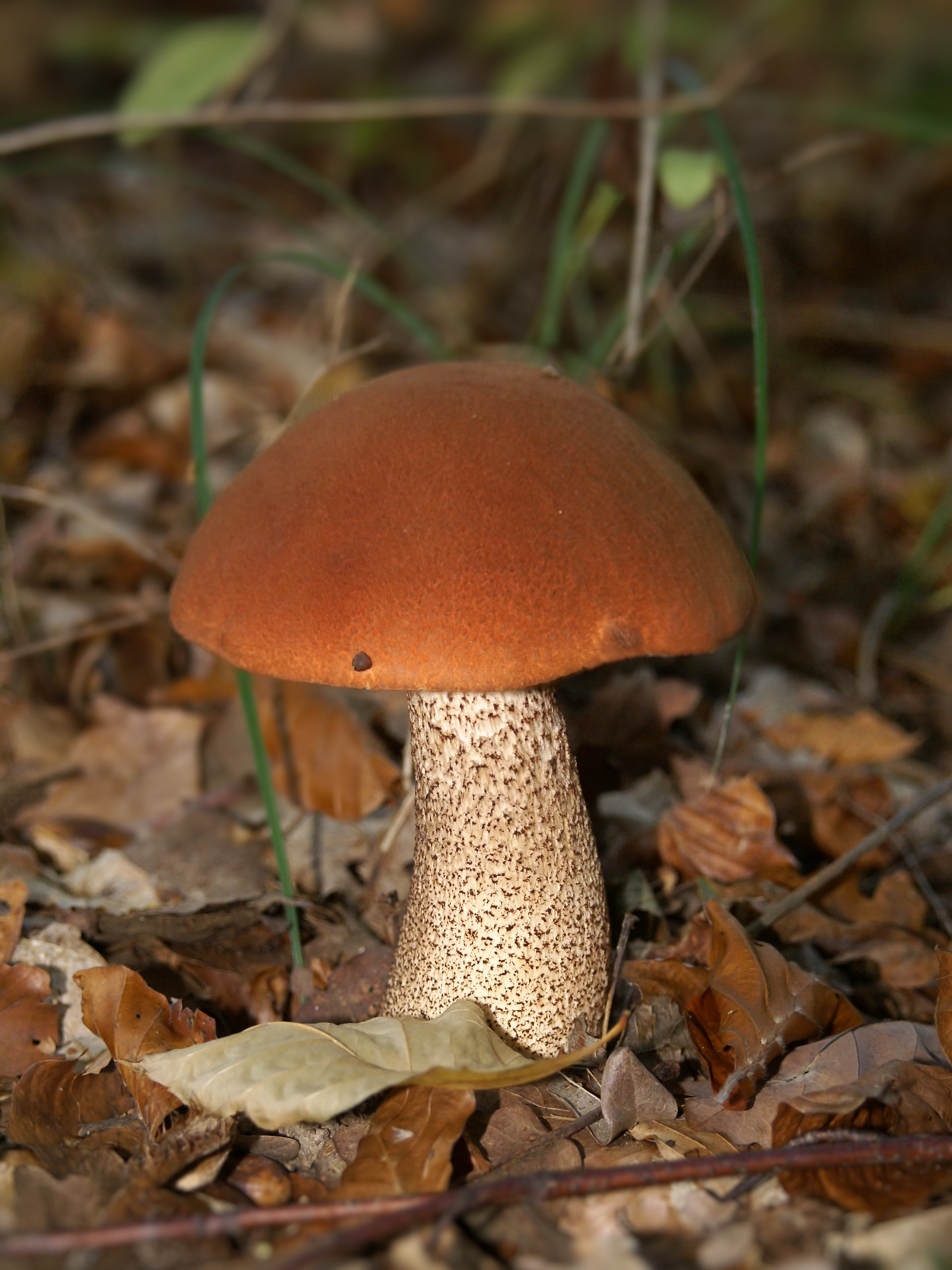
Leccinum aurantiacum

- Leccinum aeneum
- Leccinum alaskanum
- Leccinum albellum
- Leccinum arbuticola
- Leccinum arctostaphylos
- Leccinum arenicola
- Leccinum areolatum
- Leccinum armeniacum
- Leccinum atrostipitatum
- Leccinum aurantiacum *
- Leccinum barrowsii
- Leccinum californicum
- Leccinum carpini
- Leccinum chalybaeum
- Leccinum discolor
- Leccinum fibrillosum
- Leccinum flavostipitatum
- Leccinum griseonigrum
- Leccinum holopus
- Leccinum idahoense
- Leccinum insigne
- Leccinum insolens
- Leccinum largentii
- Leccinum luteum
- Leccinum manzanitae
- Leccinum montanum
- Leccinum nigrescens
- Leccinum oxydabile
- Leccinum ponderosum
- Leccinum potteri
- Leccinum pseudoinsigne
- Leccinum roseofractum
- Leccinum roseoscabrum
- Leccinum rotundifoliae
- Leccinum rugosiceps
- Leccinum scabrum
- Leccinum snellii
- Leccinum sphaerocystis – Mexico
- Leccinum subalpinum
- Leccinum subgranulosum
- Leccinum subleucophaeum
- Leccinum subtestaceum
- Leccinum tablense
- Leccinum testaceoscabrum

== Meiorganum ==
- Meiorganum curtisii

== Neoboletus ==
- Neoboletus luridiformis
- Neoboletus pseudosulphureus

== Paragyrodon ==
- Paragyrodon sphaerosporus

== Phlebopus ==
- Phlebopus brasiliensis – Mexico
- Phlebopus colossus – Mexico

== Phylloporus ==
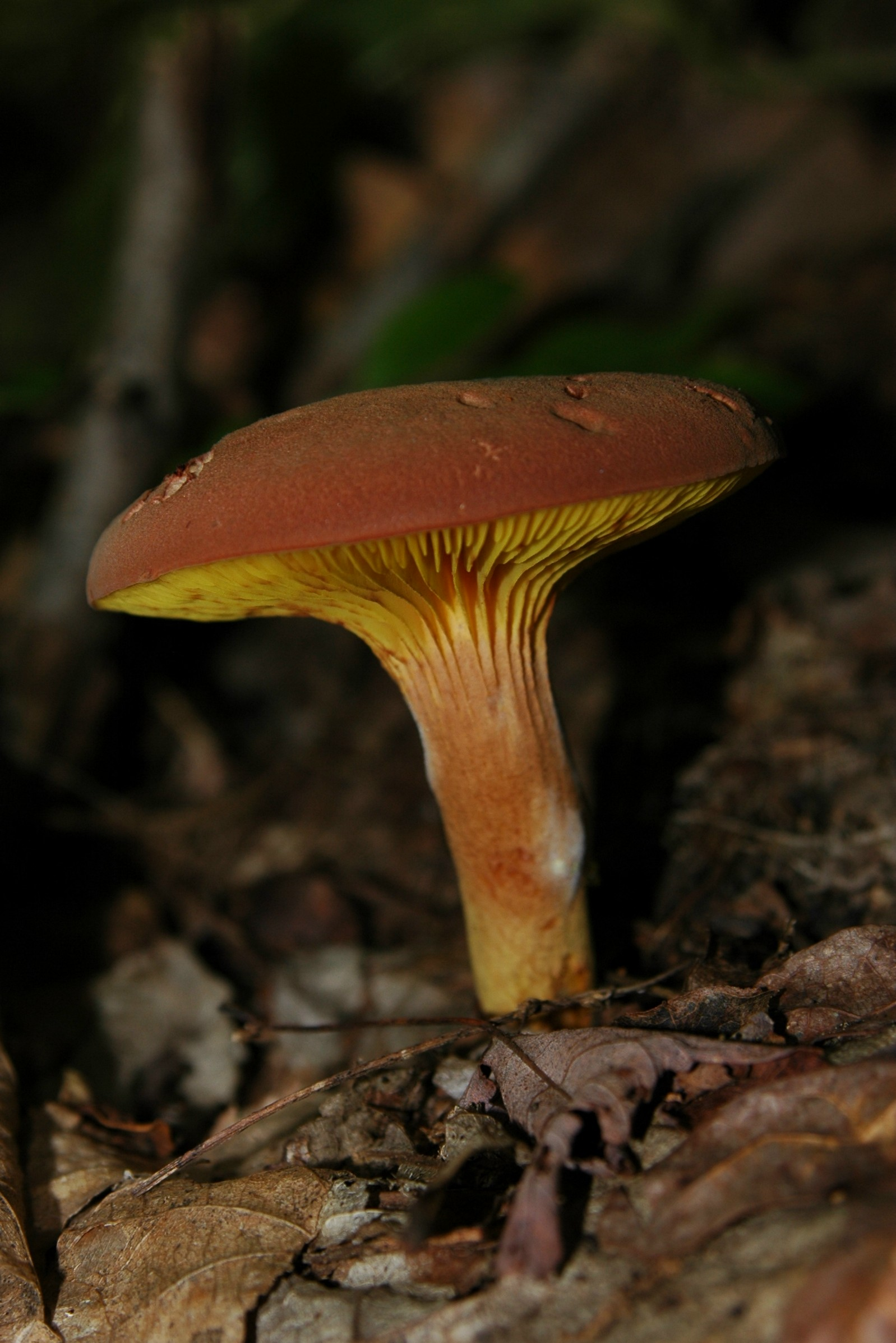
Phylloporus rhodoxanthus

- Phylloporus arenicola
- Phylloporus boletinoides
- Phylloporus foliiporus – Mexico
- Phylloporus leucomycelinus
- Phylloporus rhodoxanthus

== Porphyrellus ==
- Porphyrellus alveolatus – Mexico
- Porphyrellus heterospermus – Mexico

== Pseudoboletus ==
- Pseudoboletus parasiticus

== Pulveroboletus ==
- Pulveroboletus caespitosus
- Pulveroboletus curtisii
- Pulveroboletus melleoluteus
- Pulveroboletus ravenelii

== Retiboletus ==
- Retiboletus retipes

== Rubroboletus ==
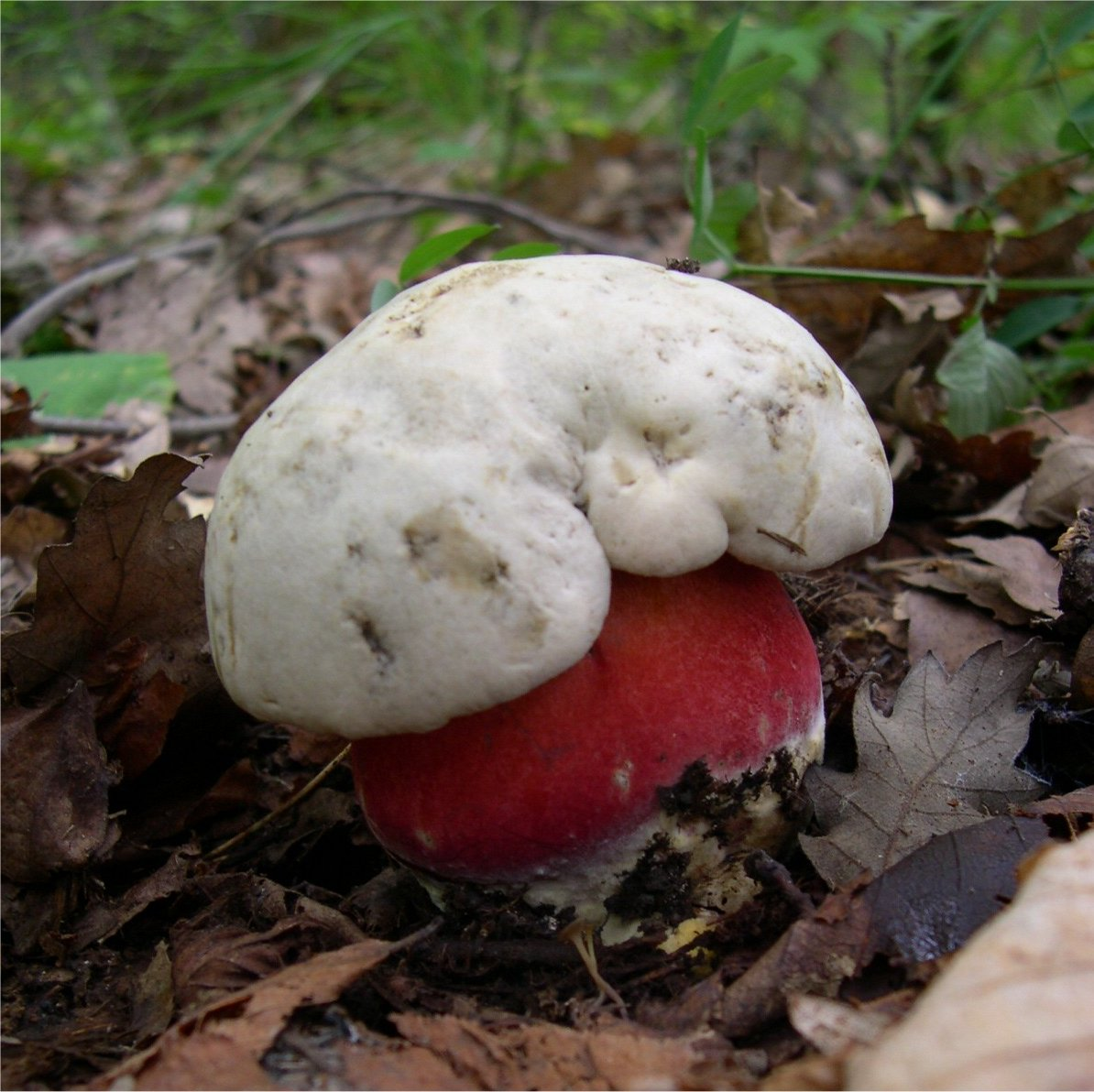
Rubroboletus satanas

- Rubroboletus haematinus
- Rubroboletus pulcherrimus
- Rubroboletus rhodosanguineus
- Rubroboletus satanas

== Strobilomyces ==
- Strobilomyces confusus
- Strobilomyces dryophilus
- Strobilomyces floccopus

== Suillellus ==
- Suillellus amygdalinus
- Suillellus floridanus
- Suillellus hypocarycinus
- Suillellus luridus
- Suillellus pictiformis

== Suillus ==
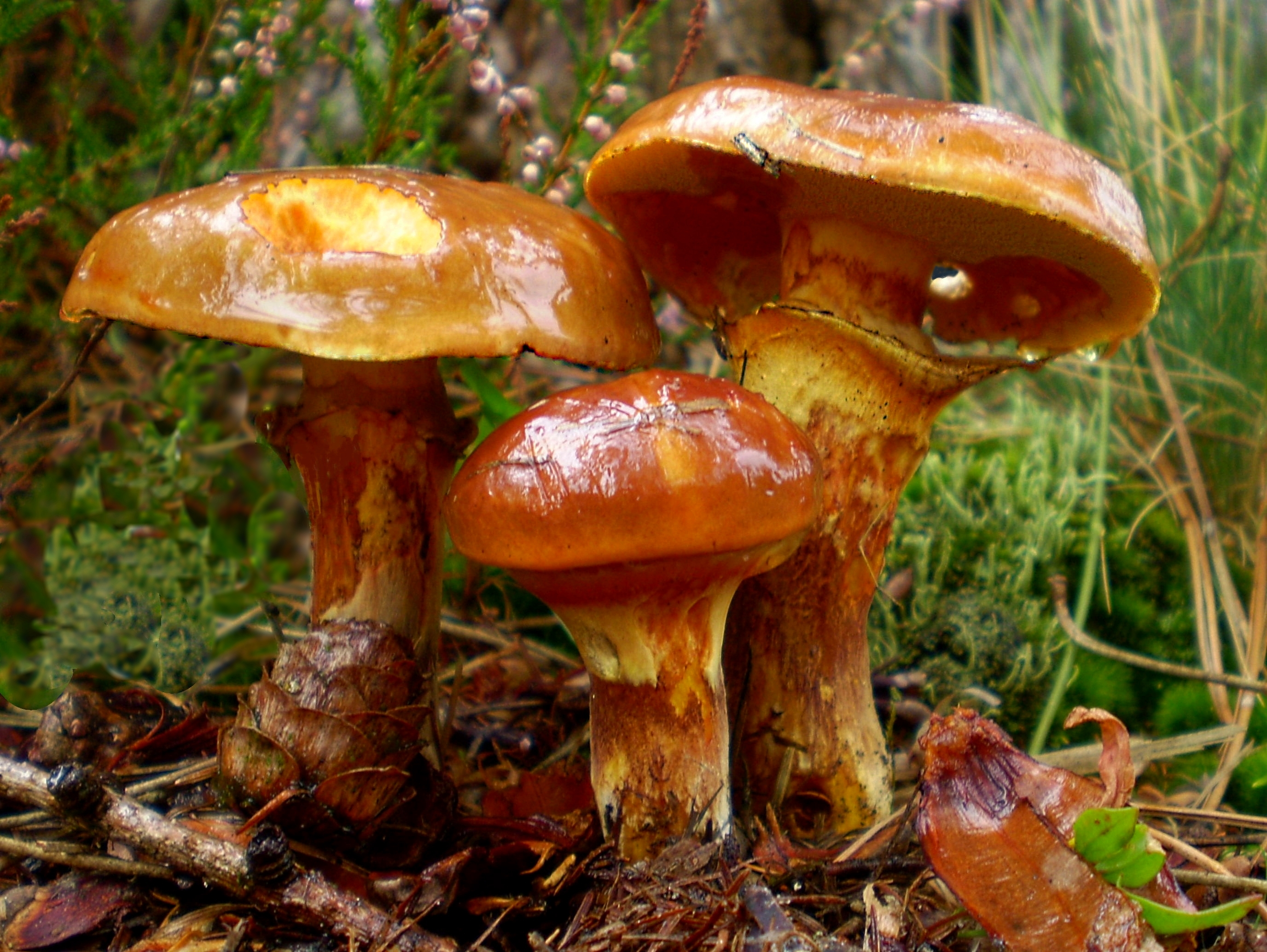
Suillus grevillei

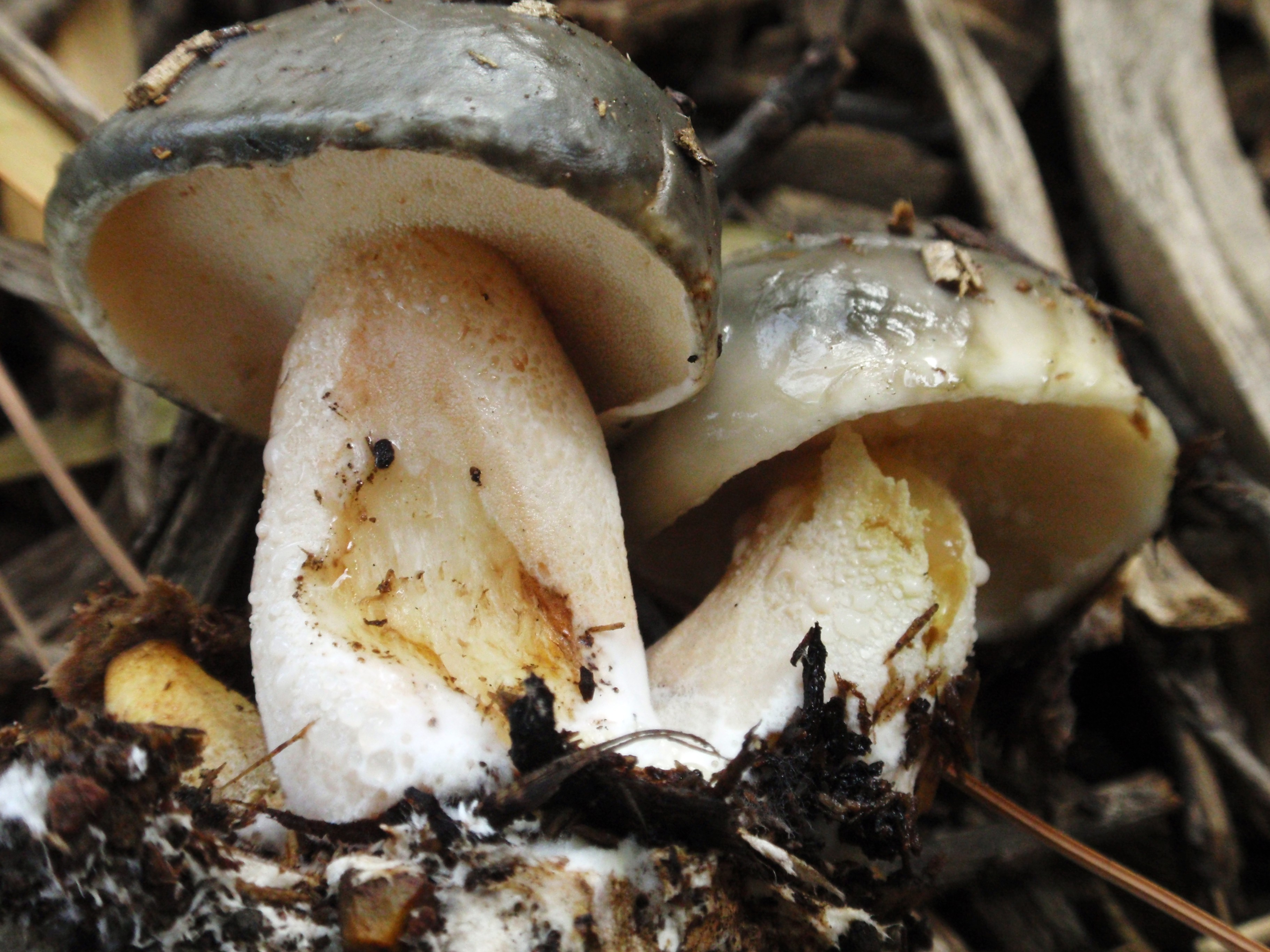
Suillus pungens

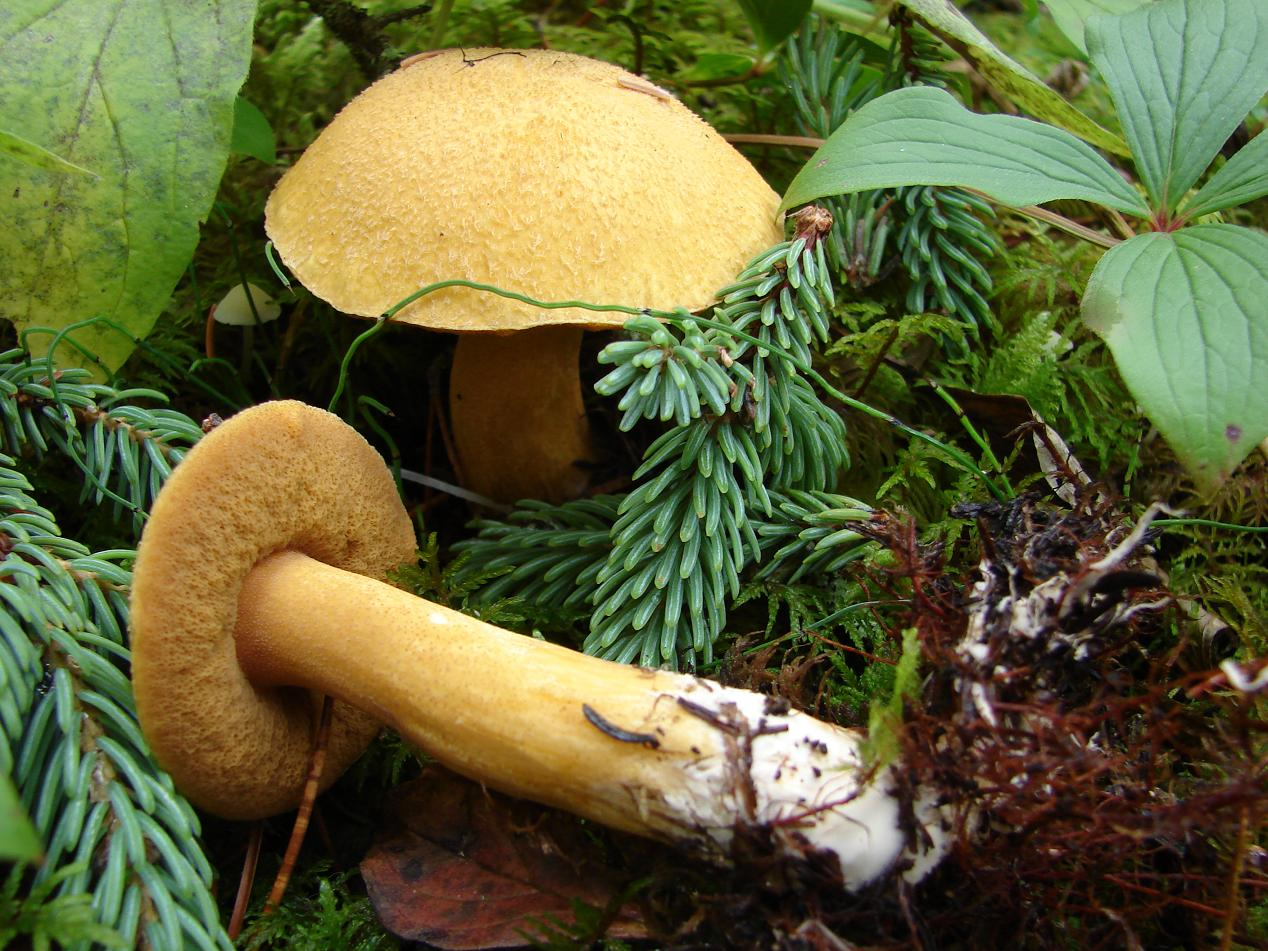
Suillus tomentosus

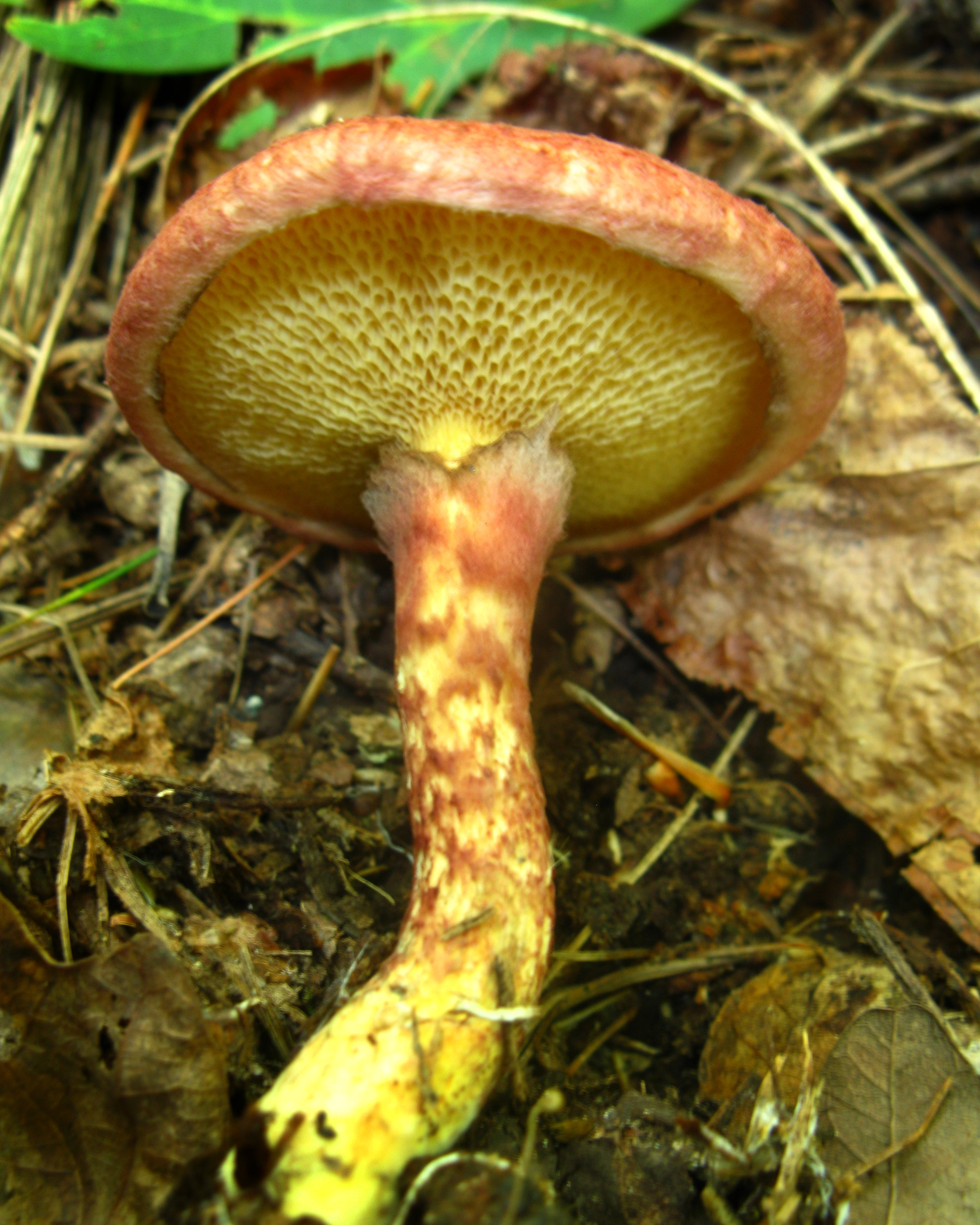
Suillus spraguei

- Suillus albivelatus
- Suillus americanus
- Suillus anomalus
- Suillus borealis
- Suillus bovinus
- Suillus brevipes
- Suillus brunnescens
- Suillus caerulescens
- Suillus castanellus
- Suillus cavipes
- Suillus chiapasensis – Mexico
- Suillus cothurnatus
- Suillus decipiens
- Suillus flavidus
- Suillus flavo-granulatus
- Suillus flavoluteus
- Suillus fuscotomentosus
- Suillus glanulosipes
- Suillus granulatus
- Suillus grevillei
- Suillus helenae
- Suillus hirtellus
- Suillus intermedius
- Suillus kaibabensis
- Suillus lactifluus
- Suillus lakei
- Suillus luteus
- Suillus neoalbidipes
- Suillus occidentalis
- Suillus pallidiceps
- Suillus placidus
- Suillus ponderosus
- Suillus pseudobrevipes
- Suillus punctatipes
- Suillus punctipes
- Suillus pungens
- Suillus salmonicolor
- Suillus sibiricus
- Suillus spraguei
- Suillus subalpinus
- Suillus subalutaceus
- Suillus subaureus
- Suillus subolivaceus
- Suillus tomentosus
- Suillus wasatchicus

== Sutorius ==
- Sutorius eximius

== Tylopilus ==
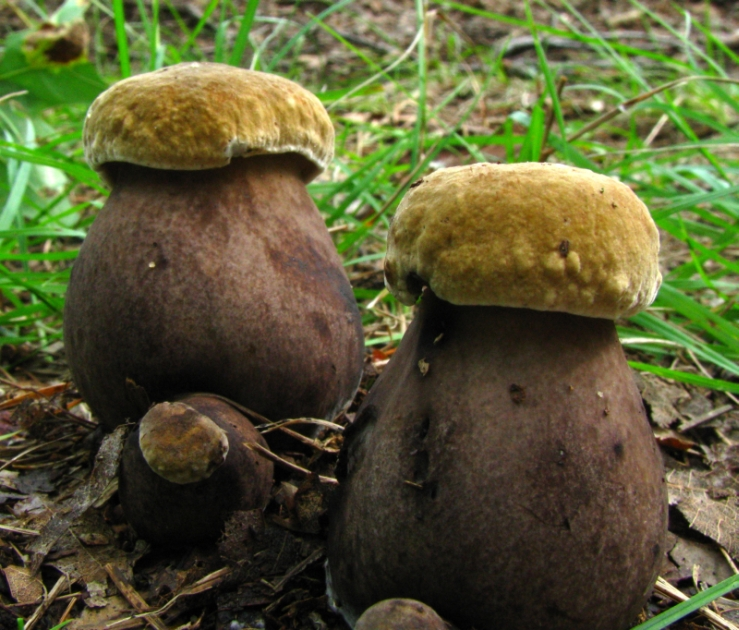
Tylopilus atronicotianus

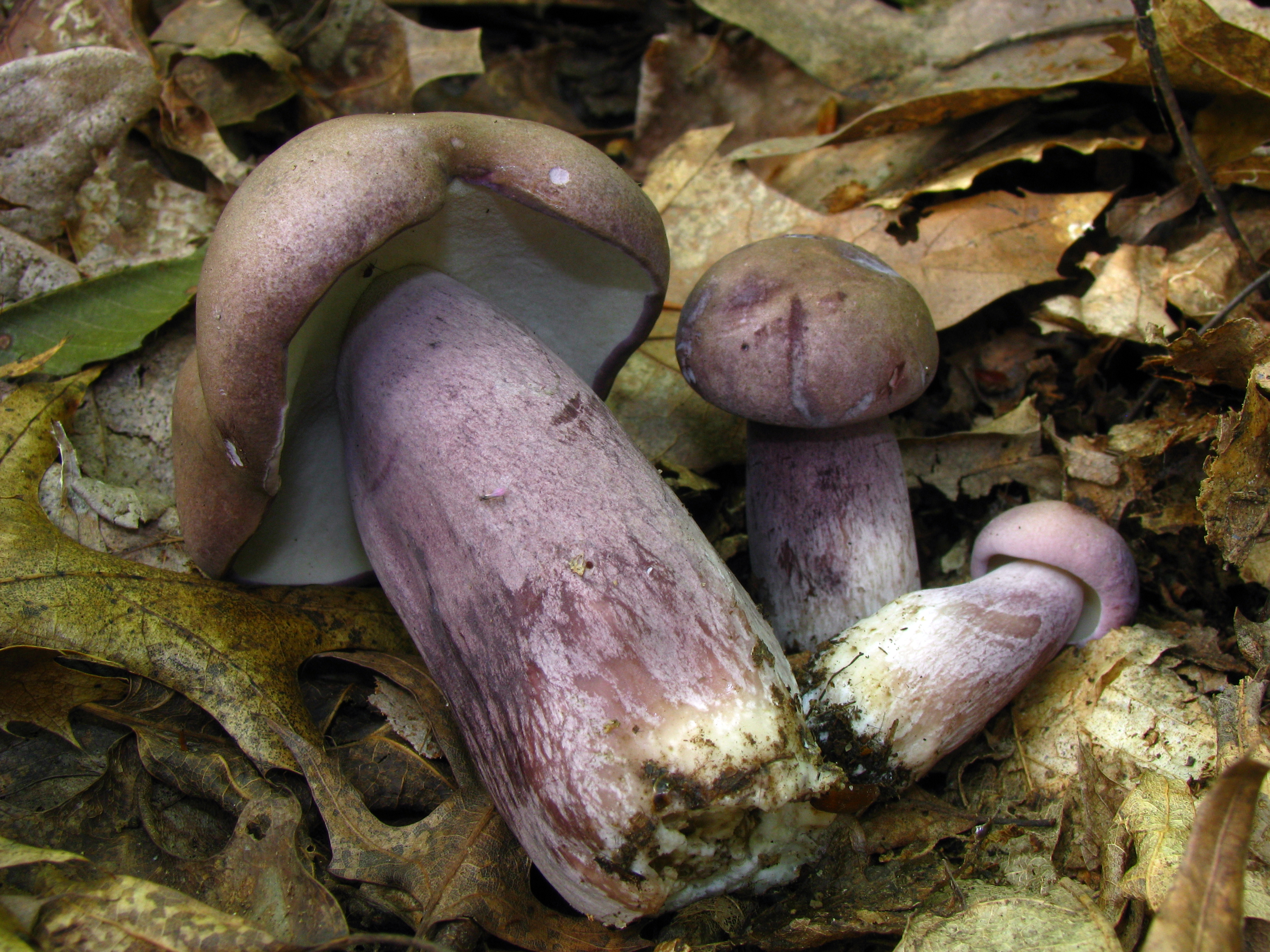
Tylopilus plumbeoviolaceus

- Tylopilus alboater
- Tylopilus ammiratii
- Tylopilus amylosporus
- Tylopilus appalachiensis
- Tylopilus atratus
- Tylopilus atronicotianus
- Tylopilus badiceps
- Tylopilus ballouii
- Tylopilus brachypus
- Tylopilus chromapes
- Tylopilus conicus
- Tylopilus felleus *
- Tylopilus ferrugineus
- Tylopilus griseocarneus
- Tylopilus humilis
- Tylopilus indecisus
- Tylopilus intermedius
- Tylopilus jalapensis
- Tylopilus leucomycelinus – Mexico
- Tylopilus minor
- Tylopilus montoyae
- Tylopilus nebulosus
- Tylopilus peralbidus
- Tylopilus plumbeoviolaceus
- Tylopilus pseudoscaber
- Tylopilus rhoadsiae
- Tylopilus rhodoconius
- Tylopilus rubrobrunneus
- Tylopilus sordidus
- Tylopilus subcellulosus
- Tylopilus tabacinus
- Tylopilus variobrunneus
- Tylopilus vinosobrunneus
- Tylopilus violatinctus
- Tylopilus williamsii

== Xanthoconium ==
- Xanthoconium affine
- Xanthoconium chattoogaense
- Xanthoconium montaltoense
- Xanthoconium purpureum
- Xanthoconium stramineum

== Xerocomellus ==
- Xerocomellus atropurpureus
- Xerocomellus chrysenteron
- Xerocomellus diffractus
- Xerocomellus zelleri

== Xerocomus ==
- Xerocomus caeruleonigrescens – Mexico
- Xerocomus coccolobae – Mexico
- Xerocomus cuneipes – Mexico
- Xerocomus illudens
- Xerocomus subtomentosus *
- Xerocomus tenax

== Citations ==
=== General references ===
- Arora D. (1986). Mushrooms Demystified: A Comprehensive Guide to the Fleshy Fungi. Berkeley, California: Ten Speed Press. ISBN 0-89815-169-4.
- Bessette AE, Roody WC, Bessette AR (2000). North American Boletes. Syracuse, New York: Syracuse University Press. ISBN 978-0-8156-0588-1.
- Grund DW, Harrison AK (1976). Nova Scotian Boletes. Lehre, Germany: J. Cramer. ISBN 3768210626.
- Jiménez JG, Ocañas FG (2001). "Conocimiento de los hongos de la familia Boletaceaede México" (PDF). Ciencia (in Spanish). 4 (3): 336–344.
- Rodríguez-Ramírez EC, Moreno CE (2010). "Bolete diversity in two relict forests of the Mexican beech (Fagus grandifolia var. mexicana; Fagaceae)". American Journal of Botany. 97 (5): 893–898. doi:10.3732/ajb.0900284. PMID 21622453.
