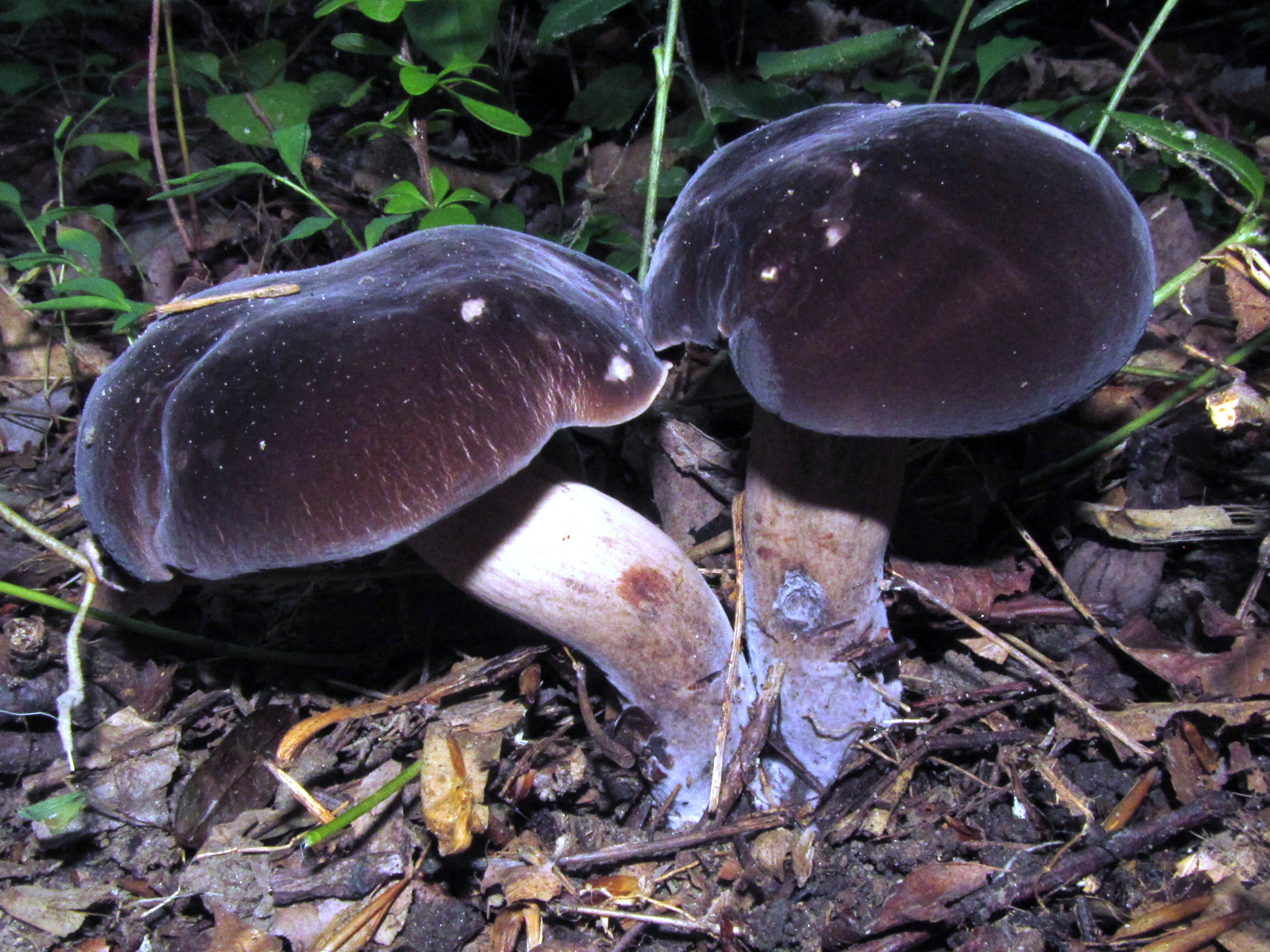

Scientific classification
- Kingdom: Fungi
- Division: Basidiomycota
- Class: Agaricomycetes
- Order: Boletales
- Family: Boletaceae
- Genus: Tylopilus
- Species: T. alboater

Binomial name
- Tylopilus alboater (Schwein.) Murrill (1909)

Synonyms
- Boletus alboater Schwein. (1822); Suillus alboater (Schwein.) Kuntze (1898); Porphyrellus alboater (Schwein.) E.-J.Gilbert (1931)

= Tylopilus alboater =

Species of fungus

Tylopilus alboater
- Mycological characteristics
- Pores on hymenium
- Cap is convex or flat
- Hymenium is adnate
- Stipe is bare
- Spore print is pink
- Ecology is mycorrhizal
- Edibility is edible

Tylopilus alboater, also known as the black velvet bolete, is a bolete fungus in the family Boletaceae.

The fruit bodies have a black to grayish-brown cap that measures up to 15 cm (6 in) in diameter. The caps of young specimens have a velvety texture and are covered with a whitish to gray powdery coating; this texture and coating is gradually lost as the mushroom matures, and the cap often develops cracks. The pores on the underside of the cap are small and pinkish. The stem is bluish purple to black, and measures up to 10 cm (4 in) long by 4 cm (1 1/2 in) thick. Both the pore surface and the whitish cap flesh will stain pink to reddish gray, and eventually turn black after being cut or injured.

The species is found in North America east of the Rocky Mountains, and in eastern Asia, including China, Japan, Taiwan, and Thailand. A mycorrhizal species, it grows solitarily, scattered, or in groups on the ground usually under deciduous trees, particularly oak, although it has been recorded from deciduous, coniferous, and mixed forests. The mushroom is edible, and generally considered one of the best edible Tylopilus species.

== Taxonomy and naming ==
The species was first described in 1822 as Boletus alboater by Lewis David de Schweinitz from specimens he collected in North Carolina. Elias Magnus Fries sanctioned this name in his 1821 Systema Mycologicum. The species was one of several Boletus species that Otto Kuntze transferred to Suillus in his 1898 Revisio Generum Plantarum. American mycologist William Alphonso Murrill transferred it to the genus Tylopilus in 1909. In 1931, French mycologist Jean-Edouard Gilbert transferred the species to his newly created genus Porphyrellus, but this name has since been subsumed into Tylopilus. In 2025, it was transferred to the novel genus Neoporphyrellus by Yan-Chun Li, Jin Li, Roy Halling, and Todd Osmundson after phylogenetic analysis showed that Tylopilus as traditionally defined was polyphyletic.

In 1875, Charles Horton Peck described Boletus nigrellus from specimens he collected in Sand Lake, New York. Murrill reduced this name to synonymy with T. alboater in 1916, and noted that Peck's description was made from young material obtained "before the white tubes had been colored by mature spores". Several later authorities have treated Peck's species as a synonym of Tylopilus alboater; this synonymy, however, is not indicated by either of the taxonomic authorities Index Fungorum or MycoBank.

The specific epithet alboater means "white and black". It is commonly known as the "black velvet bolete"; Murrill called it the "blackish bolete".

== Description ==
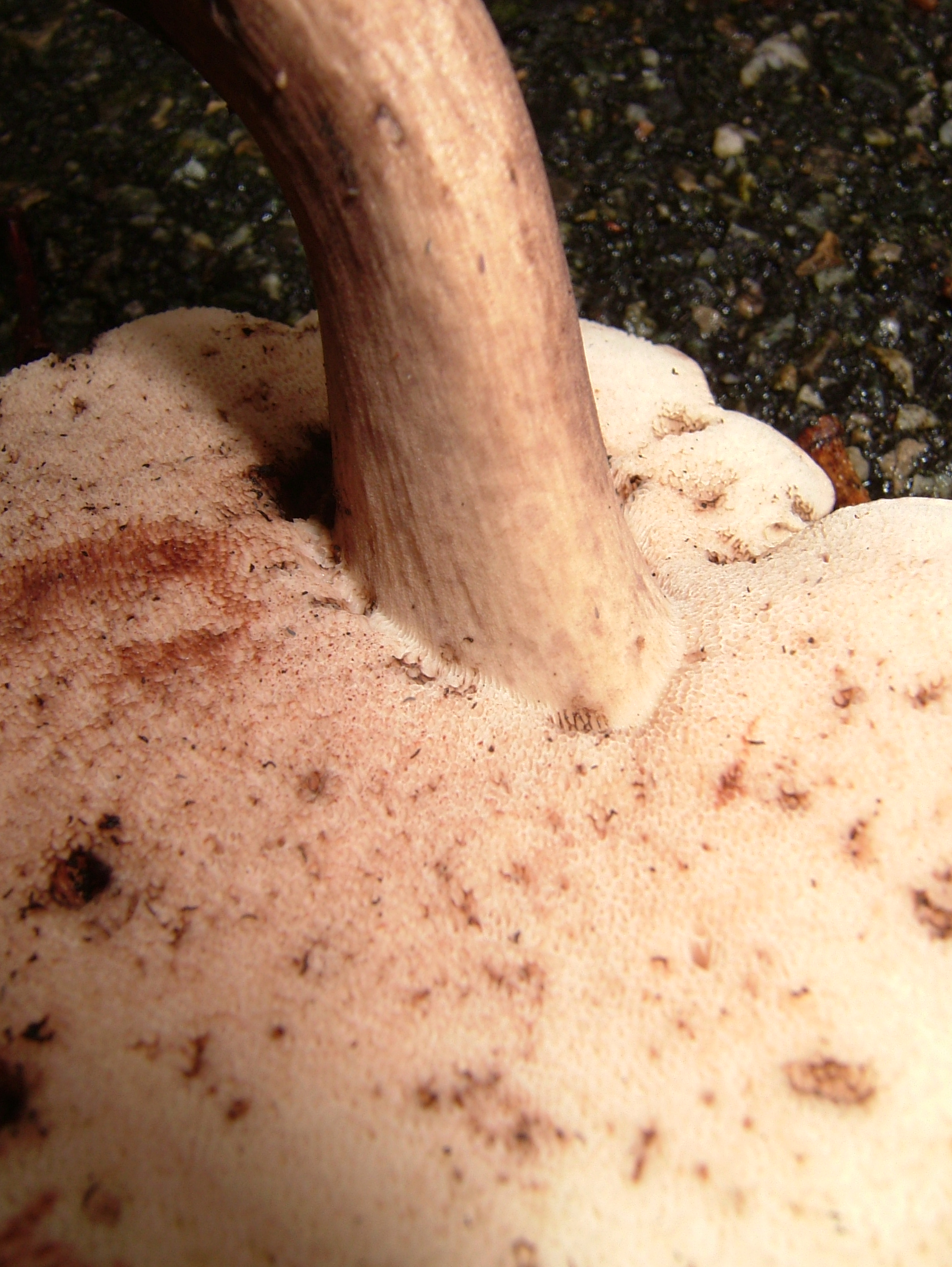
The pore surface is whitish to dull pink, and initially stains reddish with injury.

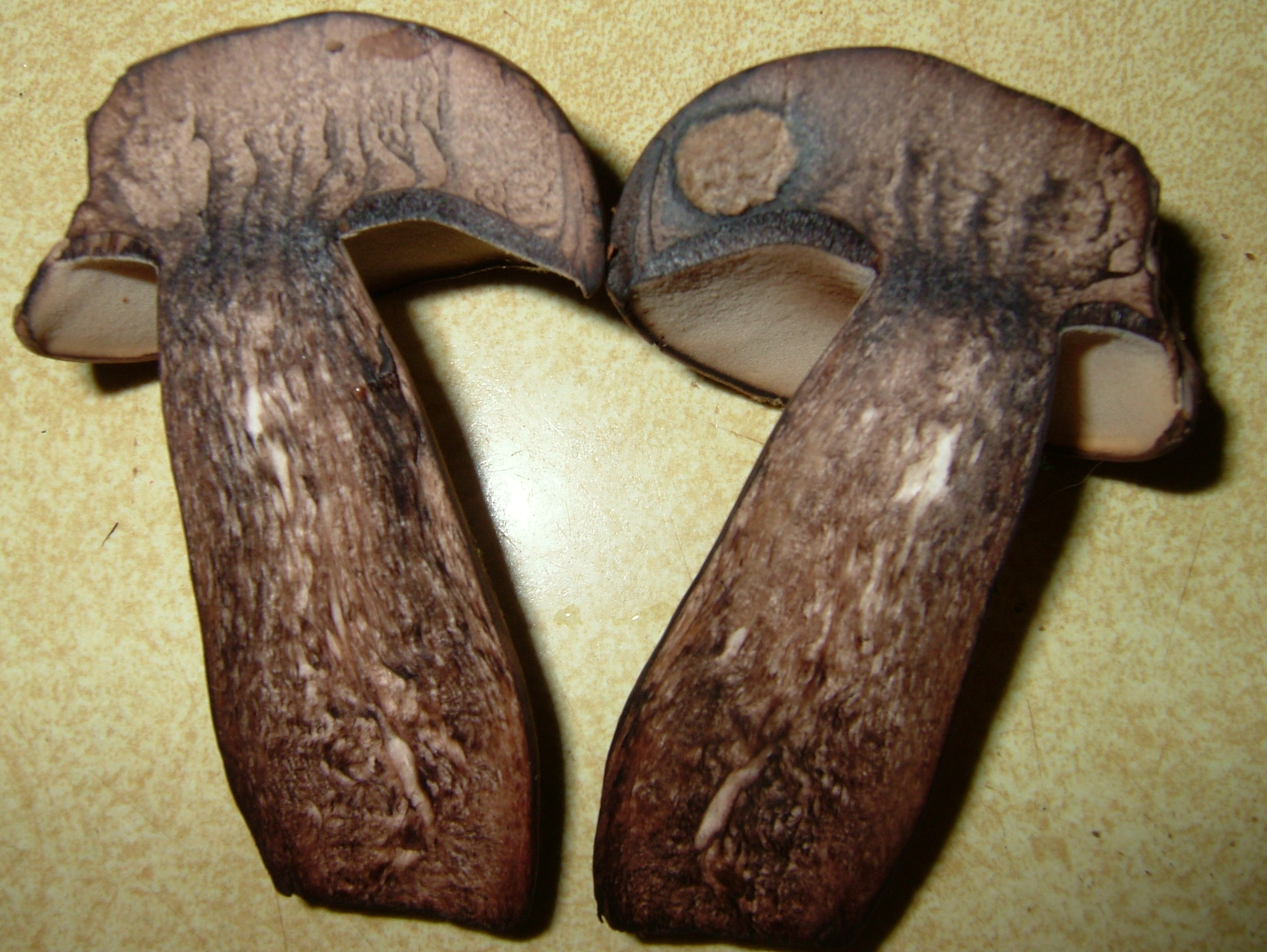
One hour after bisection, this fruit body shows the black staining that eventually develops.

The shape of the cap is initially convex before later becoming broadly convex to eventually flattened in maturity; the diameter of the cap is typically between 3 and 15 cm (1 1/4 and 6 in). The cap surface is dry, with a velvet-like texture, although in age it can become rimose (developing a network of cracks and small crevices). The cap color is initially black to dark grayish brown; young specimens can have a whitish bloom (resembling a dusting of fine powder) on the surface. Fruit bodies, especially young specimens, tend to be free of maggots and other insect larvae. As the mushroom matures, the bloom disappears and the color fades to become grayish to grayish brown. The cap flesh is whitish, but after it is cut or injured, it will stain pink to reddish gray, and eventually turn black.

Spores are produced in basidia that are arranged in a vertically arranged layer of minute tubes on the underside of the cap that create a surface of pores. This surface is whitish when young before turning dull pink or flesh-colored in maturity. When bruised, the pore surface initially stains reddish and slowly turns black. The shape of the pores is angular to irregular, and they are small, with roughly two pores per millimeter. The tubes are 5–10 mm (1/4–3/8 in) deep, and usually sunken around the area of attachment to the stem. The stem is 4–10 cm (1 1/2–4 in) long by 2–4 cm (3/4–1 1/2 in) thick, and is equal in width throughout its length, slightly thicker towards the base, or somewhat thicker in the middle. It is the same color as the cap, or paler. The surface texture of the stem is usually smooth, although some specimens may be slightly reticulated near the top. The spore print can range from pinkish to a deep flesh color.

The spores are oval to ellipsoid in shape, smooth, hyaline (translucent), and measure 7–11 by 3.5–5 μm. The basidia are club-shaped, four-spored, and measure 15–24 by 6–7.5 μm. Pleurocystidia (cystidia found on the tube faces) are irregularly club-shaped, with dimensions of 20–36 by 7–10 μm, while cheilocystidia (found on the tube edge) are club-shaped, rare, occur singly, and measure 18–32 by 7–9 μm. Although rare, there are also caulocystidia (occurring on the stem) that are arranged in groups, and which measure individually 24–30 by 6–9 μm. Clamp connections are absent from the hyphae of T. alboater.

Tylopilus alboater is an edible mushroom with a pleasant odor and a mild taste. It is considered one of the best of the edible Tylopilus—a genus that is usually associated with bitter-tasting species. Frying slices of the mushroom brings out a "delicate, earthy, nutty flavor"; longer frying times make the cap "pleasantly crisp". The mushrooms can be used in mushroom dying.

=== Similar species ===
Potential Tylopilus lookalikes

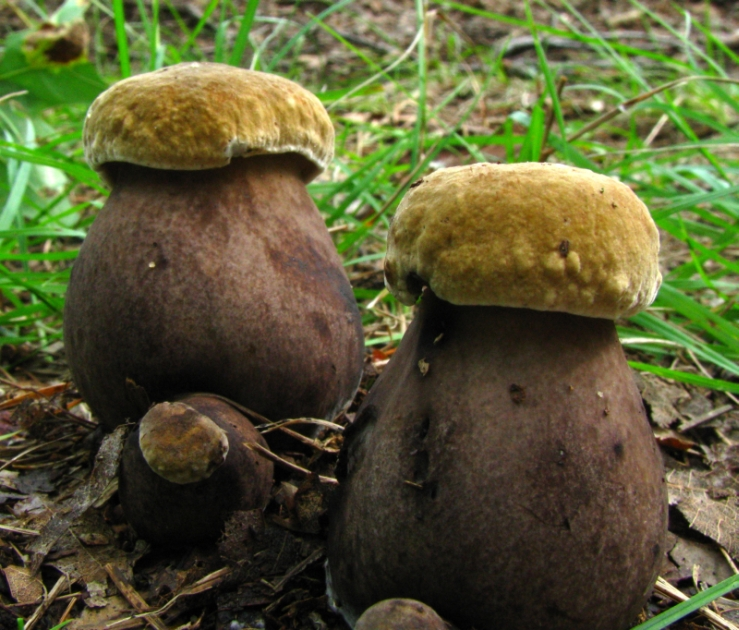
T. atronicotianus

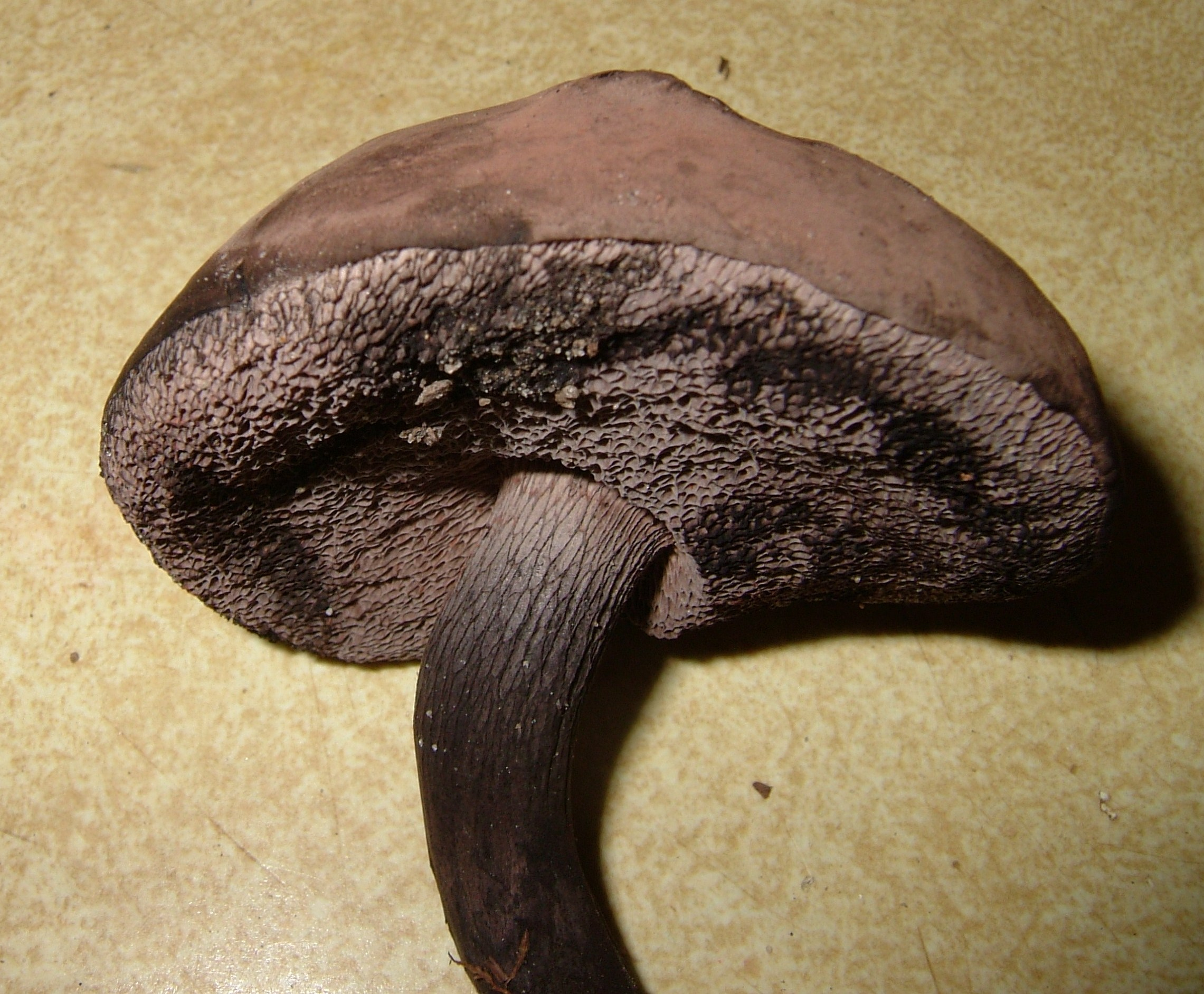
T. griseocarneus

Some Tylopilus species have a superficial resemblance to T. alboater and might be confused with it, including T. atronicotianus, T. atratus, and T. griseocarneus. T. atratus produces smaller fruit bodies with caps up to 9 cm (3.5 in) in diameter, and its whitish flesh directly stains black without any intermediate reddish phase when injured. It is known from only from western New York state. The "false black velvet bolete", T. atronicotianus, has a brownish cap that lacks the velvety texture of T. alboater, and has stems that are minutely velvety and almost black near the base. T. griseocarneus, found in the Atlantic and Gulf Coastal Plains of North America, is readily distinguished from T. alboater by the strong orange to red discoloration that results when cutting or damaging the flesh of a fresh specimen. Furthermore, T. griseocarneus lacks the whitish bloom present on young caps of T. alboater, and typically has a more prominently reticulated stem. Specimens of T. alboater that are paler than usual can be confused with T. ferrugineus, but the latter has yellow cystidia when mounted in KOH, while the cystidia of the former are brownish yellow under similar conditions.

== Distribution and habitat ==
Tylopilus alboater is a mycorrhizal species, and its fruit bodies grow on the ground solitarily, scattered, or in groups under deciduous trees, particularly oak. Fruiting occurs in deciduous, coniferous, and mixed forests. Its dark color makes it difficult to notice in the field.

It can be found from June to September in North America, where it is widely distributed east of the Rocky Mountains. Its range stretches from Quebec in Canada, south to the New England states down to Florida, extending west to Missouri, Michigan, and Texas. It is also found in Mexico. In Asia, it has been recorded from China (Anhui, Fujian, Guangdong, Guangxi, and Sichuan), Japan, Taiwan, and Thailand.

== See also ==
- List of North American boletes
