= Boletus fagicola =

Scientific classification
- Domain: Eukaryota
- Kingdom: Fungi
- Division: Basidiomycota
- Class: Agaricomycetes
- Order: Boletales
- Family: Boletaceae
- Genus: Boletus
- Species: B. fagicola

Binomial name
- Boletus fagicola A.H.Sm. & Thiers (1971)

Synonyms
- Phaeogyroporus fragicolor (Berk.) E.Horak (1980)

Species of fungus

Boletus fagicola is a fungus of the genus Boletus native to the United States. It was first described officially in 1971 by mycologists Alexander H. Smith and Harry Delbert Thiers.

== See also ==
- List of Boletus species
- List of North American boletes
