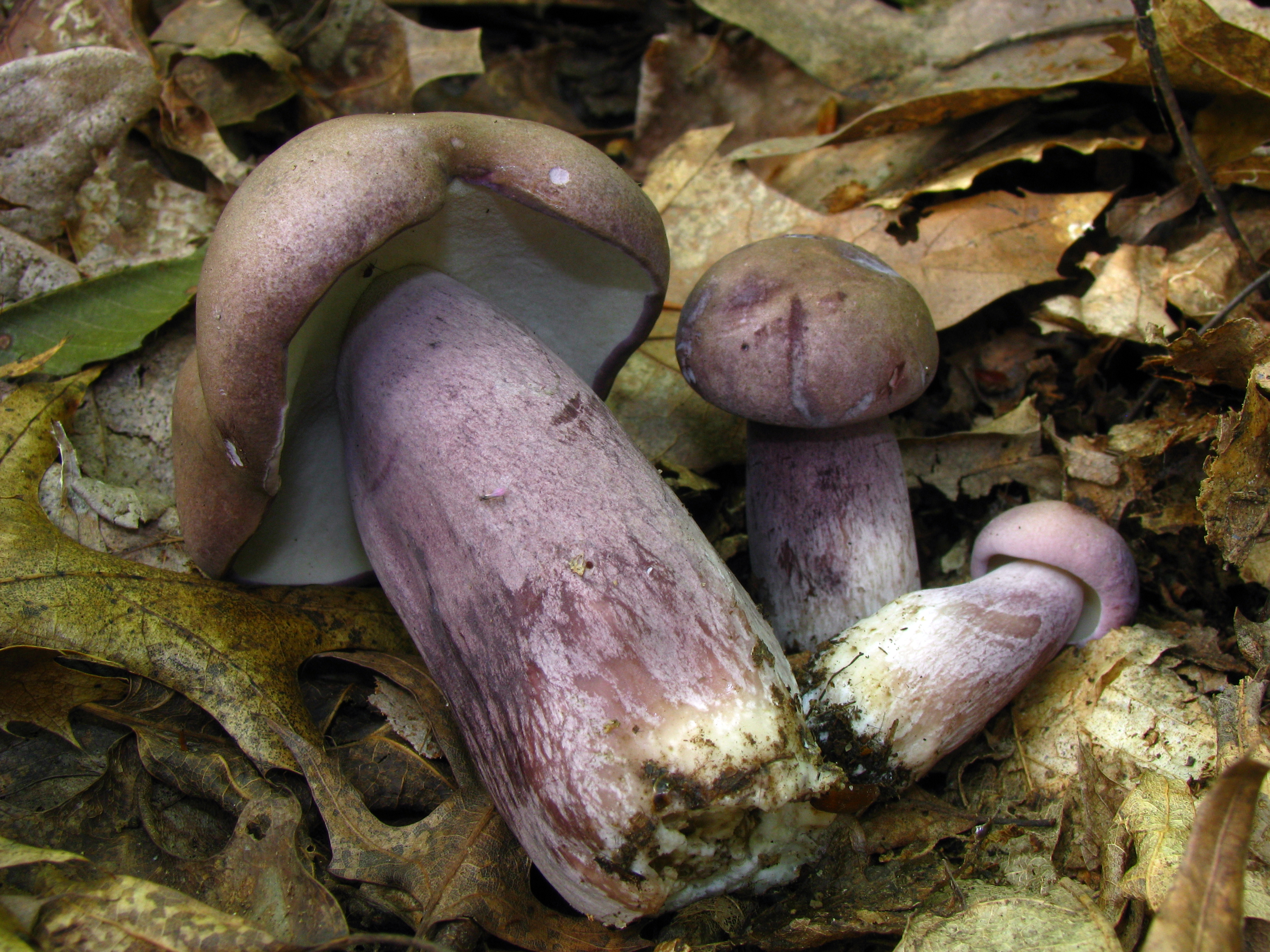
- From Strouds Run State Park, Ohio, USA

Scientific classification
- Kingdom: Fungi
- Division: Basidiomycota
- Class: Agaricomycetes
- Order: Boletales
- Family: Boletaceae
- Genus: Tylopilus
- Species: T. plumbeoviolaceus

Binomial name
- Tylopilus plumbeoviolaceus (Snell & E.A.Dick) Snell & E.A.Dick (1941)

Synonyms
- Boletus felleus f. plumbeoviolaceus Snell & E.A.Dick (1936); Boletus plumbeoviolaceus (Snell & E.A.Dick) Snell & E.A.Dick (1941)

= Tylopilus plumbeoviolaceus =

Species of fungus

Tylopilus plumbeoviolaceus Mycological characteristics
- Pores on hymenium
- Cap is convex
- Hymenium is adnate
- Stipe is bare
- Spore print is buff to pink
- Ecology is mycorrhizal
- Edibility is inedible

Tylopilus plumbeoviolaceus (formerly Boletus plumbeoviolaceus), commonly known as the violet-grey bolete, is a fungus of the bolete family. First described in 1936, the mushroom has a disjunct distribution, and is distributed in North America and Korea. The fruit bodies of the fungus are violet when young, but fade into a chocolate brown color when mature. They are solid and relatively large—cap diameter up to 15 cm (6 in), with a white pore surface that later turns pink, and a white mycelium at the base of the stem. The mushroom is inedible. A number of natural products have been identified from the fruit bodies, including unique chemical derivatives of ergosterol, a fungal sterol.

== Taxonomy ==
The species was first named 1936 as Boletus felleus forma plumbeoviolaceus by American mycologist Walter H. Snell and one of his graduate students, Esther A. Dick, based on specimens found in the Black Rock Forest near Cornwall, New York. Regarding his decision to use the taxonomic rank forma, Snell wrote:

The writer hesitates to multiply the number of forms (formae) and varieties with distinctive names, because of the ease with which one develops the habit of interpreting slight variations as definite taxonomic units... the word "form" is used instead of "variety" as making no commitment as to the actual status of the variable segregate under consideration, until further information is available.

The first collections made of the mushroom were of young, immature specimens, from which authors were unable to obtain spores for examination. It was not until a few years after that they found mature fruit bodies, which revealed that the rosy color of the pore surface took some time to develop. They concluded that this and other differences in physical characteristics, as well as differences in spore size, were enough to justify it being a species distinct from B. felleus, so in 1941 they raised the taxon to species status with the name Boletus plumbeoviolaceus. Noted Agaricales taxonomist Rolf Singer later transferred the taxon to Tylopilus in 1947, a genus characterized by a spore print that is pink, or wine red (vinaceous), rather than brown as in Boletus.

The specific name "plumbeoviolaceus" is coined from the Latin adjectives plumbeus ("leaden" or "lead-colored") and violaceus ("purple"). The mushroom is commonly known as the "violet-grey bolete".

== Description ==
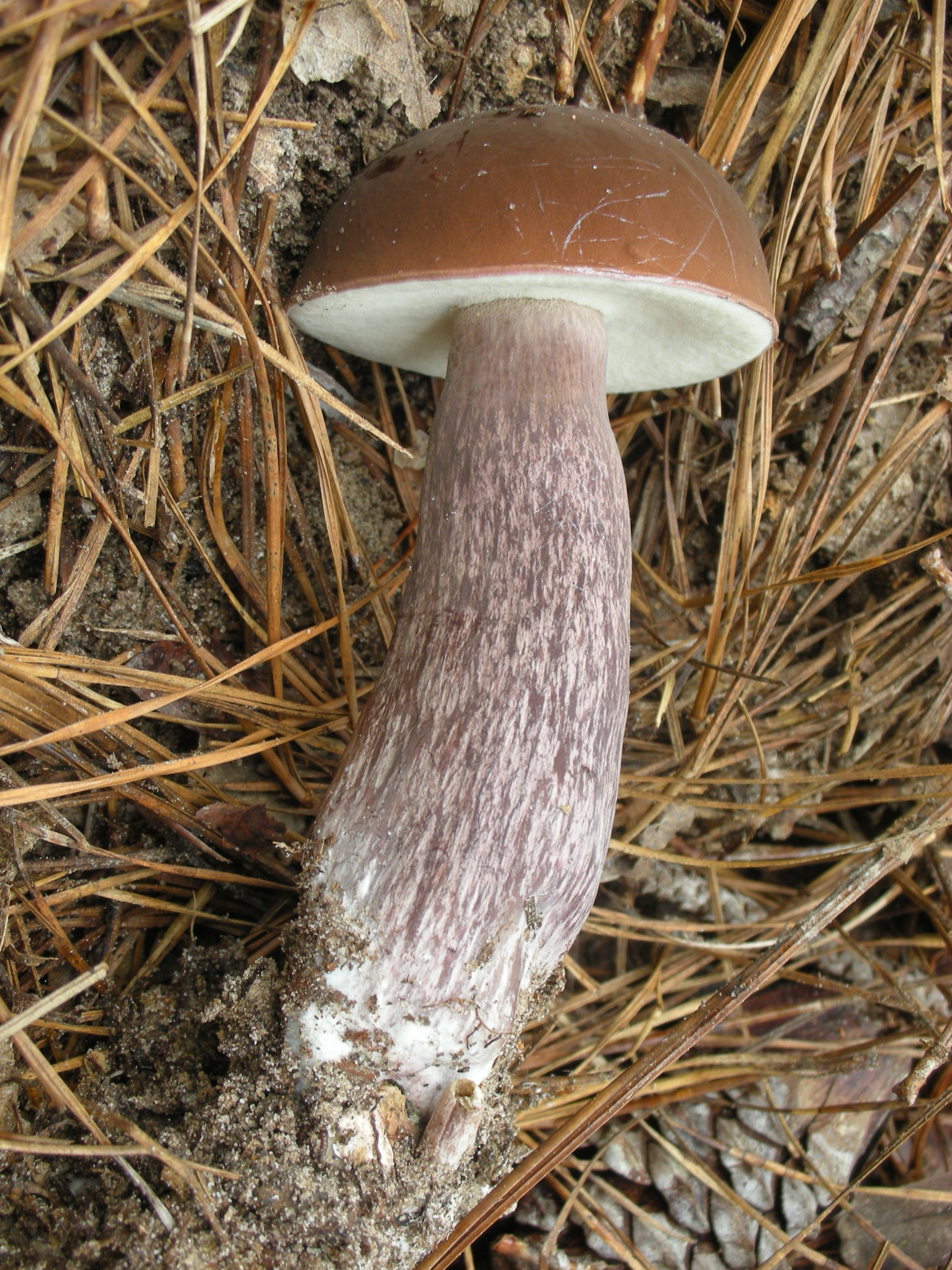
A mature specimen

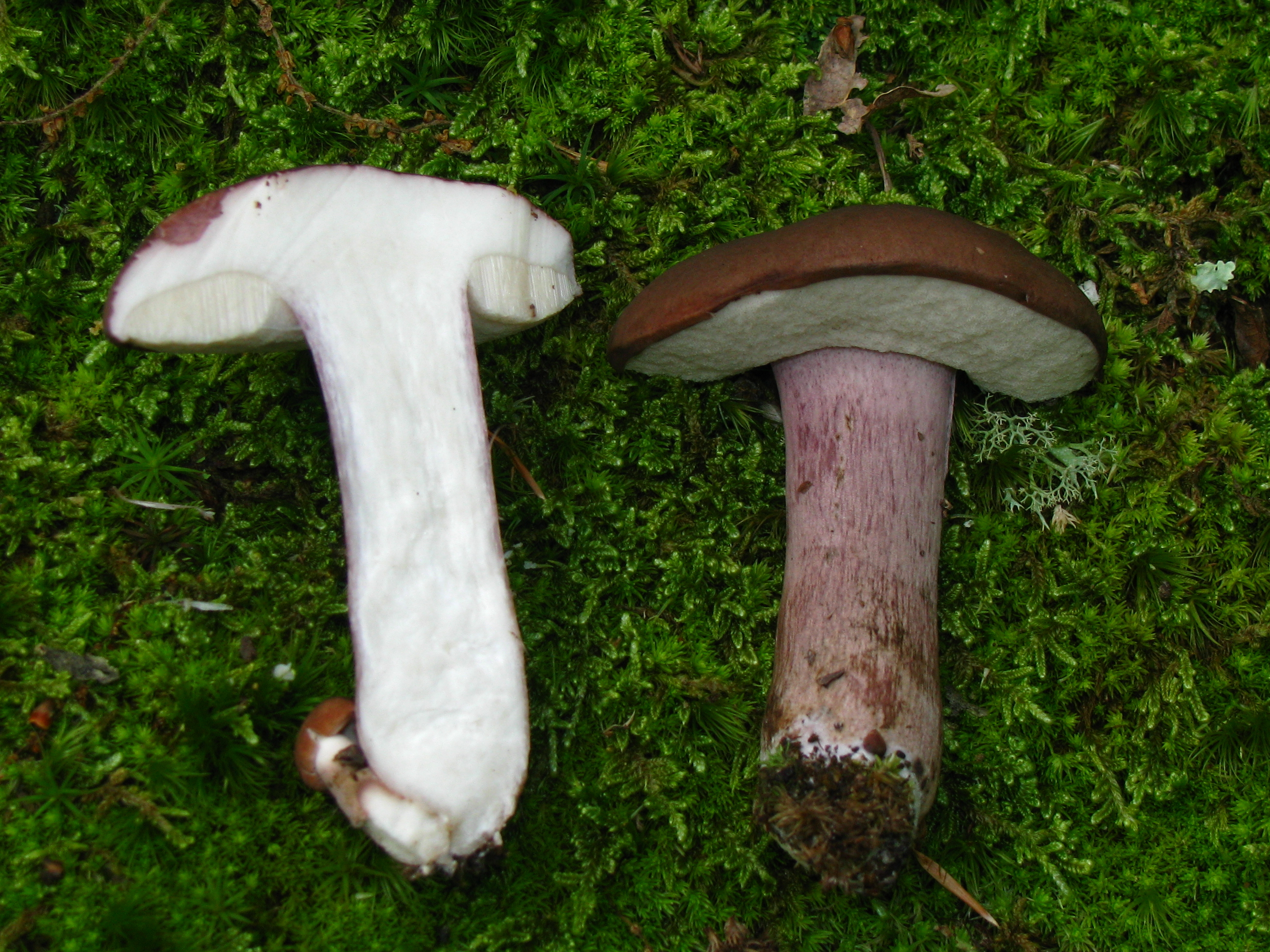
The white flesh does not stain.

The cap of the fruit body is 7 to 15 cm (2.8 to 5.9 in) in diameter, initially convex in shape but becoming centrally depressed, with a broadly arched and rounded margin. Young specimens are rather hard and firm, and the cap has a finely velvet-textured surface that soon wears off to become smooth. The color of the fruit body is violet when young, but dulls as it ages, becoming a dull violet-purplish-gray, then eventually chocolate-brown at maturity. The flesh is solid, white, and does not change color when cut or bruised. The taste is bitter, and the odor is not distinctive. Mycologist David Arora calls the mushroom "beautiful, but bitter-tasting".

The tubes on the underside of the cap are 0.4 to 1.8 cm (0.2 to 0.7 in) deep, 2 or three per millimeter, depressed at the stem (resulting in an adnate attachment). The color of the pore surface is initially white, and it remains so for a while before turning a rosy color at maturity. The stem is 8 to 13 cm (3.1 to 5.1 in) long and 2.5 to 4 cm (1.0 to 1.6 in) thick, enlarged at the base, and sometimes bulbous. The surface is slightly reticulate at the top, and smooth lower of the stem. Its color is buff to light brown, often with darker brown bruises or stains, and it has whitish mycelium at the base. The flesh of the stem is white, and it does not change color when cut or bruised.

=== Microscopic characteristics ===
Collected in deposit, like with a spore print, the spores of T. plumbeoviolaceus appear to be a light pink to flesh color. When viewed with a light microscope, they are elliptical, with smooth walls and dimensions of 9.1–12.3 by 3.4–4.5 μm. The basidia (cellular structures that produce the spores) are club-shaped, and measure about 26 by 6.5 μm. The cuticle of the cap (the pileipellis) is made of a tangle of smooth-walled, narrow, brownish hyphae. When stained in potassium hydroxide, the hyphal contents tend to form beads, while staining in Melzer's reagent causes the pigment to form globules. Cystidia are common in the hymenial tissue; they are swollen at the base and narrow at the apex (lageniform), measuring 30–40 μm long by 7–9 μm thick. Clamp connections are absent in the hyphae.

=== Edibility ===
T. plumbeoviolaceous is considered inedible, and has a strongly bitter taste. The presence of a bitter bolete may spoil a meal, as the bitter taste does not disappear with cooking.

=== Similar species ===
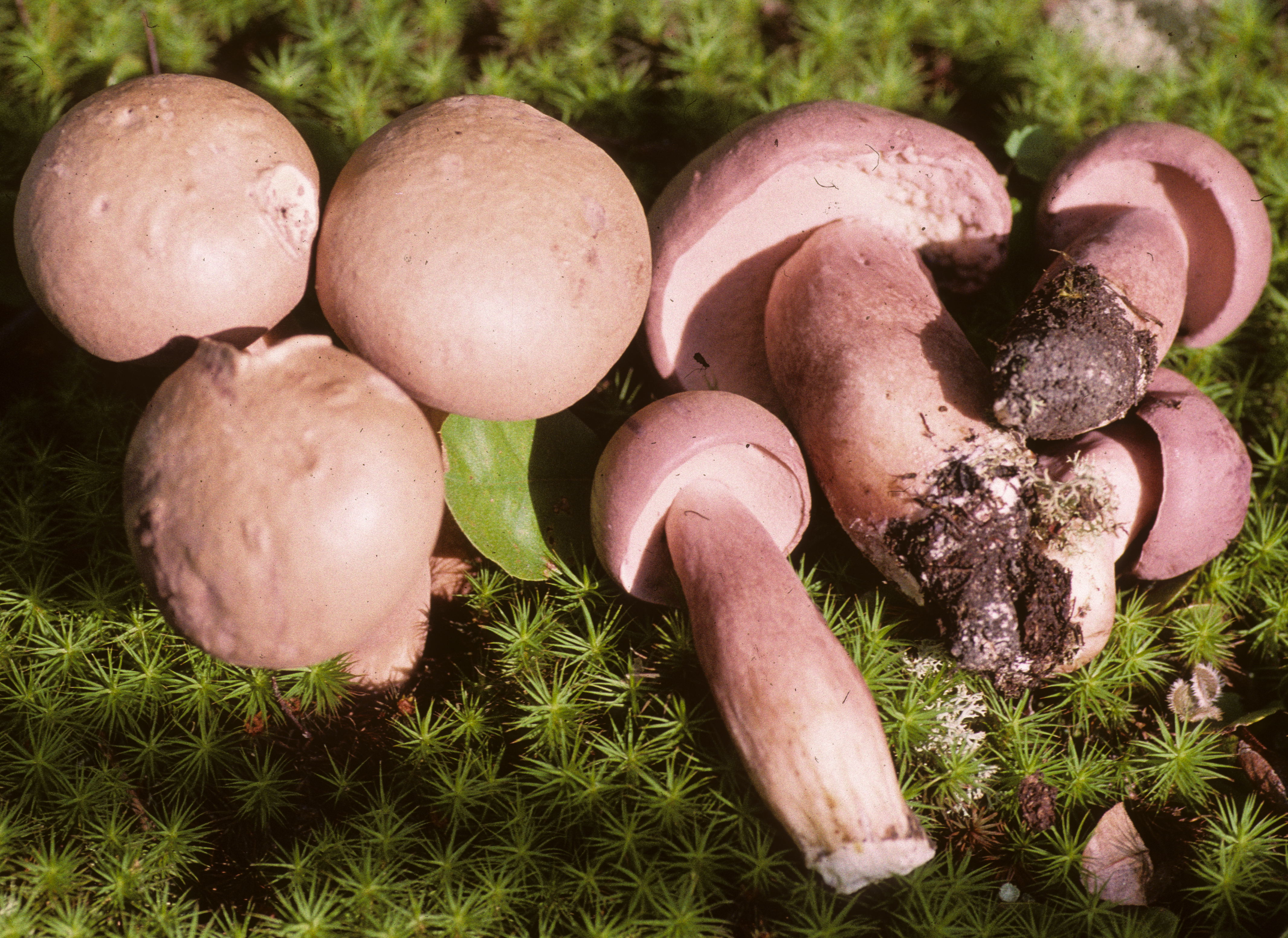
Lookalike species T. violatinctus is paler.

There are few other species that might be confused with T. plumbeoviolaceus; according to one source, it "is one of the most remarkable and easily identified boletes in the USA". Tylopilus violatinctus, found under both hardwoods and conifers and known from New York to Mississippi, has a similar appearance. It can be distinguished by a paler, lilac-colored cap that, in older specimens, is discolored rusty purple along the edge of the cap. Its spores are 7–10 by 3–4 μm. As Tylopilus violatinctus was not described until 1998, some older literature may confuse the two species.

Young specimens of Tylopilus rubrobrunneus have a purplish cap, but unlike T. plumbeoviolaceous, their stems are never purple. The species Tylopilus microsporus, known only from China, is characterized by pale violet to violet cap, paler purple to purplish brown stem, and flesh color to pale purplish red pores. In addition to its different distribution, it can be distinguished from T. plumbeoviolaceus by its smaller spores. Another similar Asian species, T. obscureviolaceus, is only known from the Yaeyama Islands in southwestern Japan. It differs from T. plumbeoviolaceous in having a cap that does not fade in color to grayish or brownish when mature, shorter spores (6–7.2 by 3.3–4 μm), and other microscopic characteristics.

== Habitat and distribution ==
Tylopilus plumbeoviolaceous is a mycorrhizal species, and the bulk of the fungus lives underground, associating in a mutualistic relationship with the roots of various tree species. The fruit bodies are found growing singly, scattered or clustered together during mid-summer to autumn in deciduous forests, often under beech or oak trees; however, it sometimes occurs in mixed hardwood-conifer forests under hemlock. A preference for sandy soil has been noted. In North America, the mushroom can be found in the west from June to September, and east of the Rocky Mountains from Canada to Mexico. The species has also been collected in North Korea.

== Ecology ==
Fruit bodies can serve as a food source for fungus-feeding Drosophila flies.

== Bioactive compounds ==
Two derivatives of ergosterol have been isolated from the fruit bodies of T. plumbeoviolaceus: tylopiol A (3β-hydroxy-8α,9α-oxido-8,9-secoergosta-7,9(11),22-triene) and tylopiol B (3β-hydroxy-8α,9α-oxido-8,9-secoergosta-7,22dien-12-one). These sterols are unique to this species. Additionally, the compounds ergosta-7,22-dien-3β-ol, uridine, allitol, ergosterol, ergosterol 5α,8α-peroside, ergothioneine, adenosine, and uracil have been identified from the mushrooms.

== See also ==
- List of North American boletes
