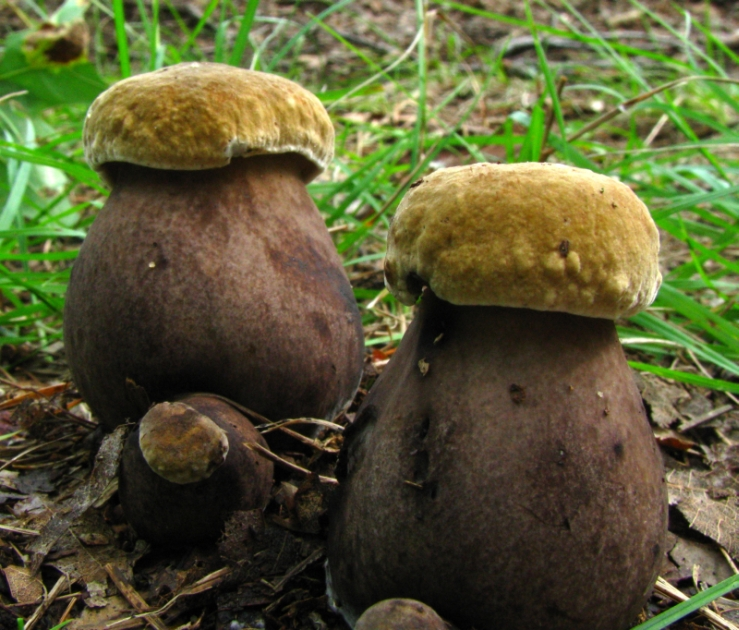

Scientific classification
- Kingdom: Fungi
- Division: Basidiomycota
- Class: Agaricomycetes
- Order: Boletales
- Family: Boletaceae
- Genus: Tylopilus
- Species: T. atronicotianus

Binomial name
- Tylopilus atronicotianus Both (1998)

= Tylopilus atronicotianus =

Species of fungus

Tylopilus atronicotianus
- Mycological characteristics
- Pores on hymenium
- Cap is convex or flat
- Hymenium is adnate
- Stipe is bare
- Spore print is reddish-brown
- Ecology is mycorrhizal
- Edibility is unknown

Tylopilus atronicotianus, commonly known as the false black velvet bolete, is a bolete fungus in the family Boletaceae. First described scientifically in 1998, it is known only from the eastern United States.

== Taxonomy ==
The species was first described scientifically by Ernst Both, curator emeritus in mycology at the Buffalo Museum of Science, based on specimens he found growing in New York state. The specific epithet atronicotianus means "dark tobacco", and refers to the color of the cap. The mushroom is commonly known as the "false black velvet bolete".

In 2025, it was transferred to the novel genus Neoporphyrellus by Yan-Chun Li, Jin Li, Roy Halling, and Todd Osmundson after phylogenetic analysis showed that Tylopilus as traditionally defined was polyphyletic.

== Description ==
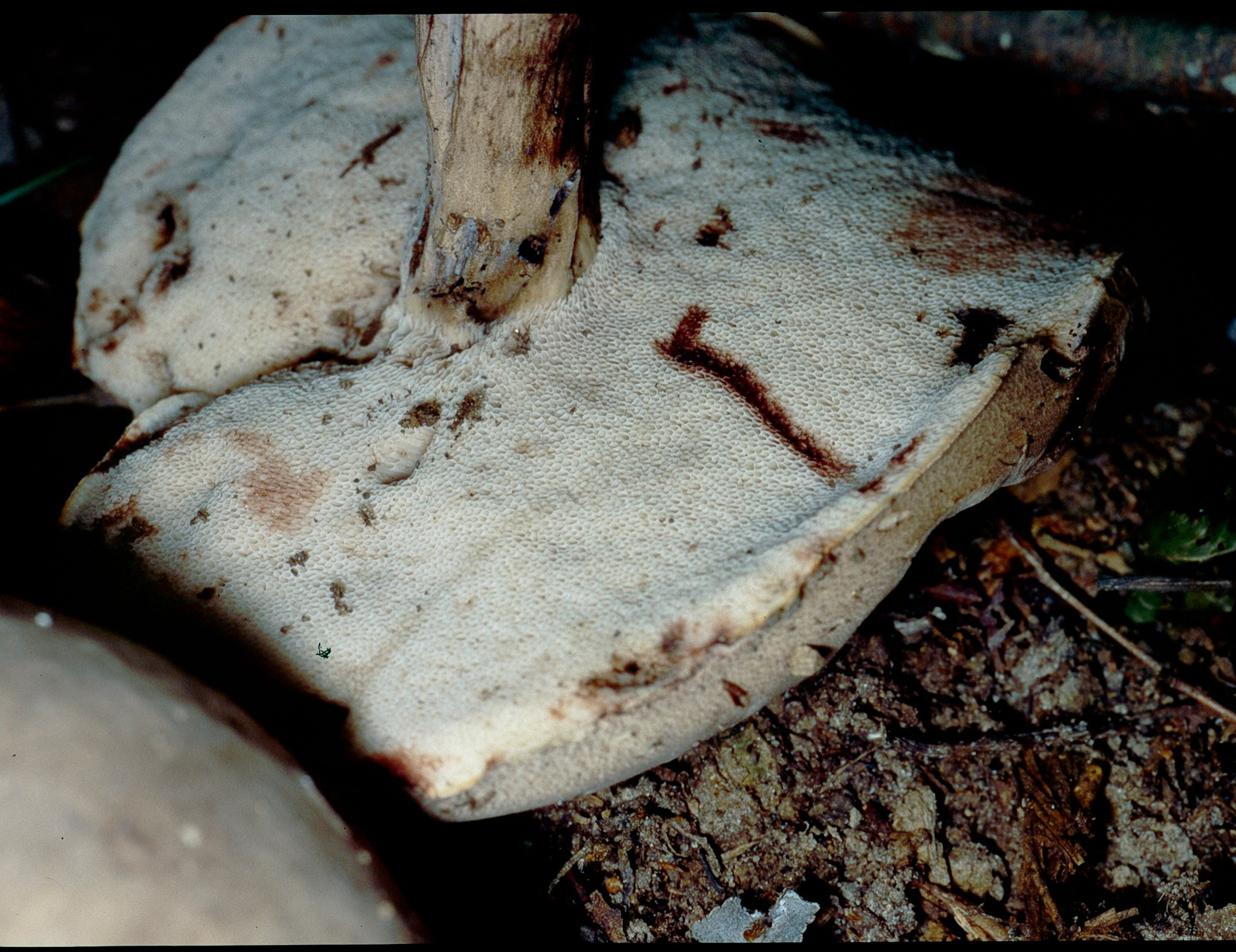
The pore surface is initially white, but will stain to a blackish color when injured.

The cap ranges in shape from hemispheric to broadly convex to flattened depending on its age, and it is usually between 7.5–20 cm (3.0–7.9 in) in diameter. The cap margin is rolled inward in young specimens and unrolls as it matures. The cap surface is dry, smooth, and slightly shiny; its color ranges from light brown to olive-brown, although it tends to be darker in age. The flesh is whitish, but after it is cut or injured, will slowly stain pink to pinkish-red, eventually becoming black. The pore surface on the underside of the cap is initially white before turning reddish-brown in age. The pores are small and angular (up to 1.5 millimeters wide), and the tubes comprising the pores are 8–22 mm (0.3–0.9 in) deep. They are a bright brown color, and will stain black when injured.

The stem is solid (not hollow), and measures 6–12 cm (2.4–4.7 in) long by 1.5–4.5 cm (0.6–1.8 in); it is roughly equal in width throughout its length or tapered on either end. The color of the stem is grayish to dark brown, and almost black at the base. The stem surface is finely tomentose (covered with short, dense, matted hairs), and usually lacks reticulations (a net-like pattern of rides present in some Tylopilus species), although it may be finely reticulated near the apex. The stem flesh is grayish to blackish in color. Mushrooms produce a reddish-brown spore print, while the spores themselves are narrowly oval, smooth, hyaline (translucent), and measure 7.5–10.5 by 4–5 μm. The edibility of the mushroom has not been determined. Fruit bodies have been used in mushroom dying to produce a variety of brownish colors.

The "black velvet bolete", Tylopilus alboater, is roughly similar in appearance, but is distinguished by a blacker cap with less brown color, and a velvety cap texture.

== Habitat and distribution ==
Tylopilus atronicotianus is a mycorrhiza species, and is found in mixed tree stands with deciduous trees such as red oak, beech, and hemlock. The fruit bodies grow on the ground solitarily, scattered, or in groups. The species is fairly common in its range, which includes western New York and West Virginia, although the true limits of its distribution have yet to be precisely determined.

== See also ==
- List of North American boletes
