= Gastroleccinum =

Scientific classification
- Kingdom: Fungi
- Division: Basidiomycota
- Class: Agaricomycetes
- Order: Boletales
- Family: Boletaceae
- Genus: Gastroleccinum; Thiers (1989)

Type species
- Gastroleccinum scabrosum (Mazzer & A.H.Sm.) Thiers (1989)

Genus of fungi

Gastroleccinum is a fungal genus in the family Boletaceae. It is a monotypic genus, represented by the single species Gastroleccinum scabrosum. The genus was circumscribed by Harry Delbert Thiers in 1989.

== See also ==
- List of North American boletes
