= Leccinum aeneum =

Scientific classification
- Domain: Eukaryota
- Kingdom: Fungi
- Division: Basidiomycota
- Class: Agaricomycetes
- Order: Boletales
- Family: Boletaceae
- Genus: Leccinum
- Species: L. aeneum

Binomial name
- Leccinum aeneum Halling (1977)

Species of fungus

Leccinum aeneum is a species of bolete fungus in the family Boletaceae. Found in the United States, it was described as new to science in 1977 by mycologist Roy Halling.
