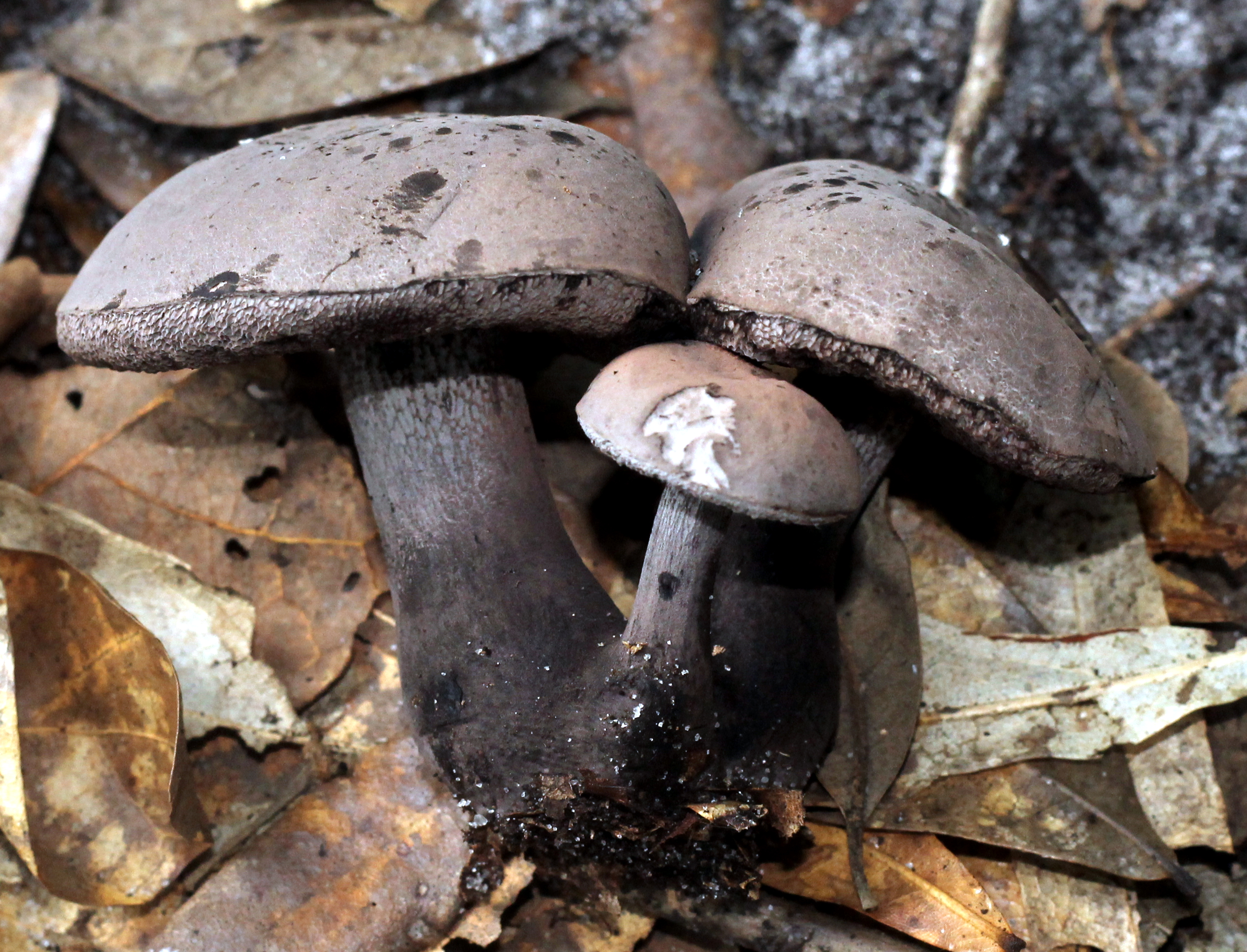

Scientific classification
- Domain: Eukaryota
- Kingdom: Fungi
- Division: Basidiomycota
- Class: Agaricomycetes
- Order: Boletales
- Family: Boletaceae
- Genus: Tylopilus
- Species: T. griseocarneus

Binomial name
- Tylopilus griseocarneus Wolfe & Halling (1989)

= Tylopilus griseocarneus =

Species of fungus

Tylopilus griseocarneus is a fungus of the family Boletaceae. Described as new to science in 1989, it is found in the coastal plains of southern New Jersey and southern Louisiana in the United States, where it grows in sandy soil under oak and pine trees. Its fruit bodies have a convex, pale charcoal-colored cap measuring 4.3–11 cm (1.7–4.3 in) and 1.5–3 cm (0.6–1.2 in) thick.

== See also ==
- List of North American boletes
