= Tylopilus atratus =

Scientific classification
- Domain: Eukaryota
- Kingdom: Fungi
- Division: Basidiomycota
- Class: Agaricomycetes
- Order: Boletales
- Family: Boletaceae
- Genus: Tylopilus
- Species: T. atratus

Binomial name
- Tylopilus atratus Both (1998)

Species of fungus

Tylopilus atratus is a fungus of the genus Tylopilus native to North America. It was described scientifically by Ernst Both in 1998.

== See also ==
- List of North American boletes
