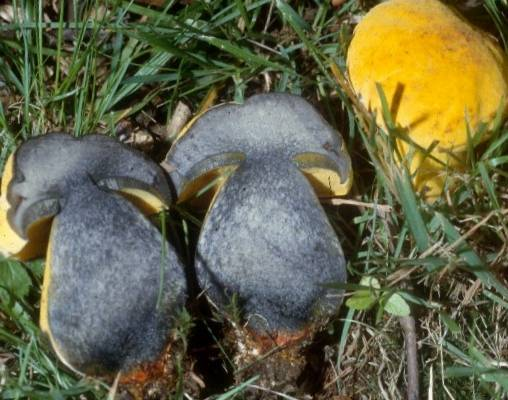

Scientific classification
- Kingdom: Fungi
- Division: Basidiomycota
- Class: Agaricomycetes
- Order: Boletales
- Family: Boletaceae
- Genus: Neoboletus
- Species: N. pseudosulphureus

Binomial name
- Neoboletus pseudosulphureus (Kallenb.) W. Klofac (2015)

Synonyms
- Boletus pseudosulphureus Kallenb.

= Neoboletus pseudosulphureus =

Species of fungus

Neoboletus pseudosulphureus is a species of bolete fungus in the family Boletaceae. It is found in Europe, Central America, North America, and India, where it grows in deciduous and mixed forests. Initially uniformly yellow in color, all external surfaces of the fruit body undergo a variety of discolorations as it matures.

== Habitat and distribution ==
The fungus is known from Europe, eastern North America, and Costa Rica, where it fruits on the ground in deciduous and mixed forests, usually in a mycorrhizal association with oak, but occasionally with pine. It was reported from Himachal Pradesh, India for the first time in 1993.

== Taxonomy ==
The fungus was first described scientifically by German mycologist Franz Joseph Kallenbach in 1923, from collections made in Germany. A year later, Kallenbach published a more thorough description. Some authors have historically considered Boletus junquilleus—a species described by Lucien Quelet in 1897—to be a synonym, including first Gilbert and Leclair in 1942, and Rolf Singer in 1947. The confusion between the two arises over the amount of red pigmentation in the pores near the stem, and on the base of the stem. Reid has suggested that differences are due only to climatic conditions, with the red colors appearing in conditions of lower temperature. It was transferred to the genus Neoboletus in 2015.

== Description ==
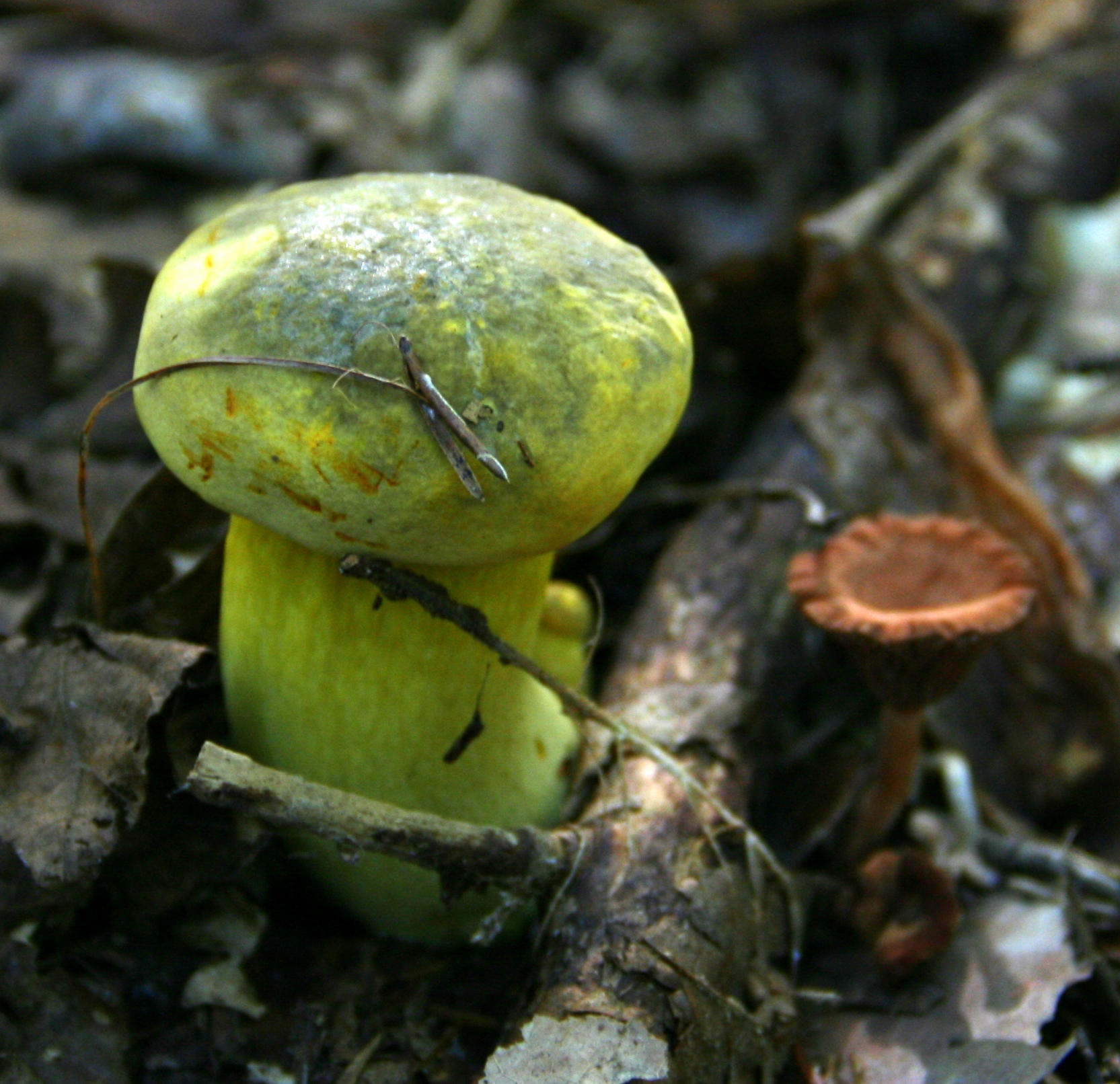
A young fruit body

The mushroom has a cushion-shaped to convex cap measuring 4–12 cm (1.6–4.7 in) wide. The cap color is bright yellow when young, fading to dull yellow or tan when mature, and usually develops orange or reddish discolorations. The pore surface is initially bright yellow before turning greenish yellow to brownish yellow. The stem is 4–12 cm (1.6–4.7 in) long by 2–5 cm (0.8–2.0 in) thick, and somewhat thicker near the base. Although it is usually not reticulate, the upper part of the stem may have reticulations. All parts of the mushroom stain blue to bluish black when injured. The stark color changes that occur over the lifespan of the fruit body led one author to suggest that "the mushroom's personal grooming skills go to hell in a handbasket". A variety N. pseudosulphureus var. pallidus, found in Nova Scotia, is pale yellow with a lighter colored olive spore print compared to the nominate variety.

=== Similar species ===
Orton compared the similar Neoboletus junquilleus, concluding that it could be distinguished from N. pseudosulphureus by the following features: red-orange pores near the stem (compared to completely yellow); red color in stem base (compared to yellow or brownish); and a red-punctate stem (compared to yellow-punctate).

== Occurrence in the UK ==
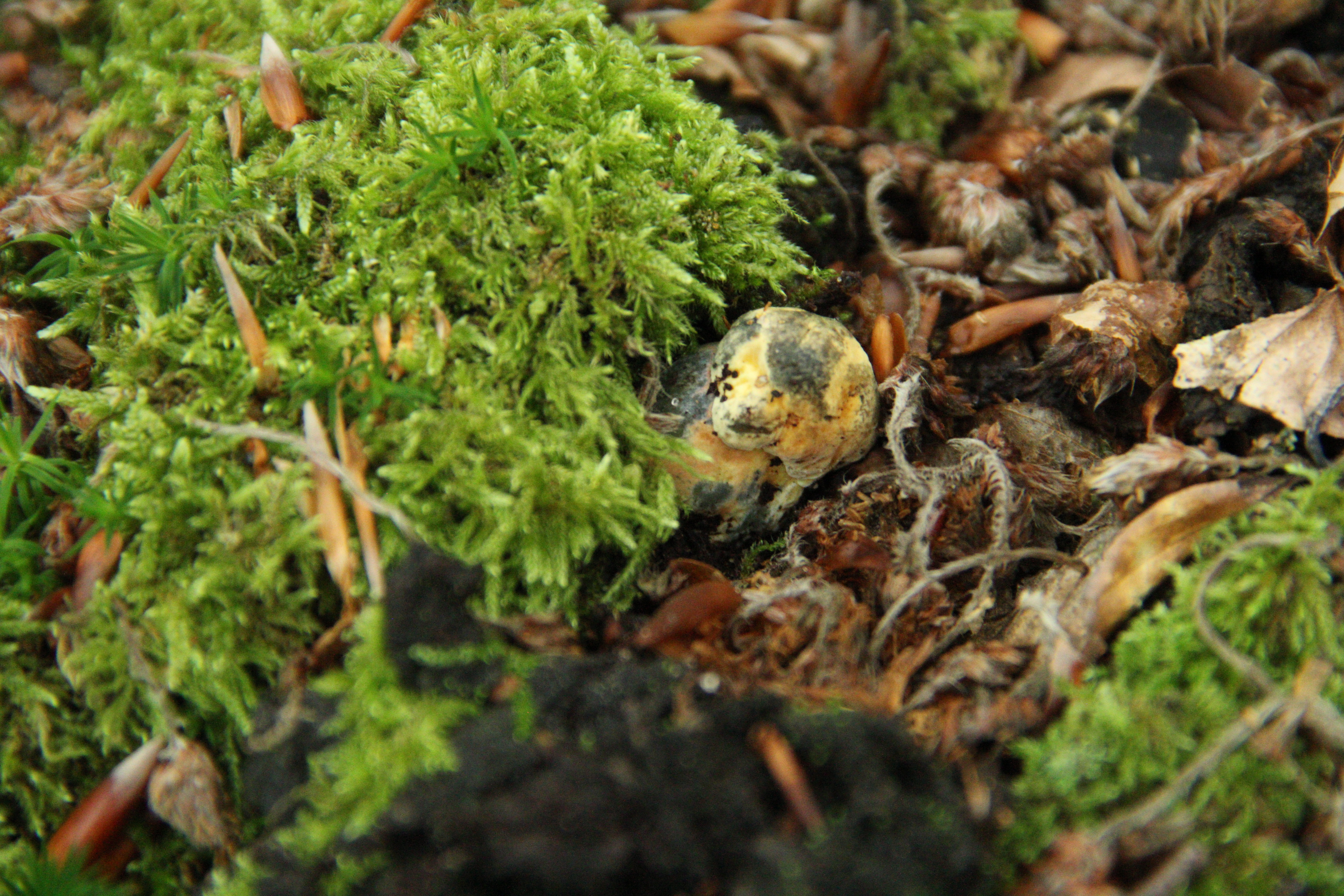
N. pseudosulphureus Thetford Forest

N. pseudosulphureus is an incredibly rare species in the UK, one of the 5 boletes assessed as "Endangered" by the JNCC, which estimate there are only 130 mature fruiting individuals in the UK.
