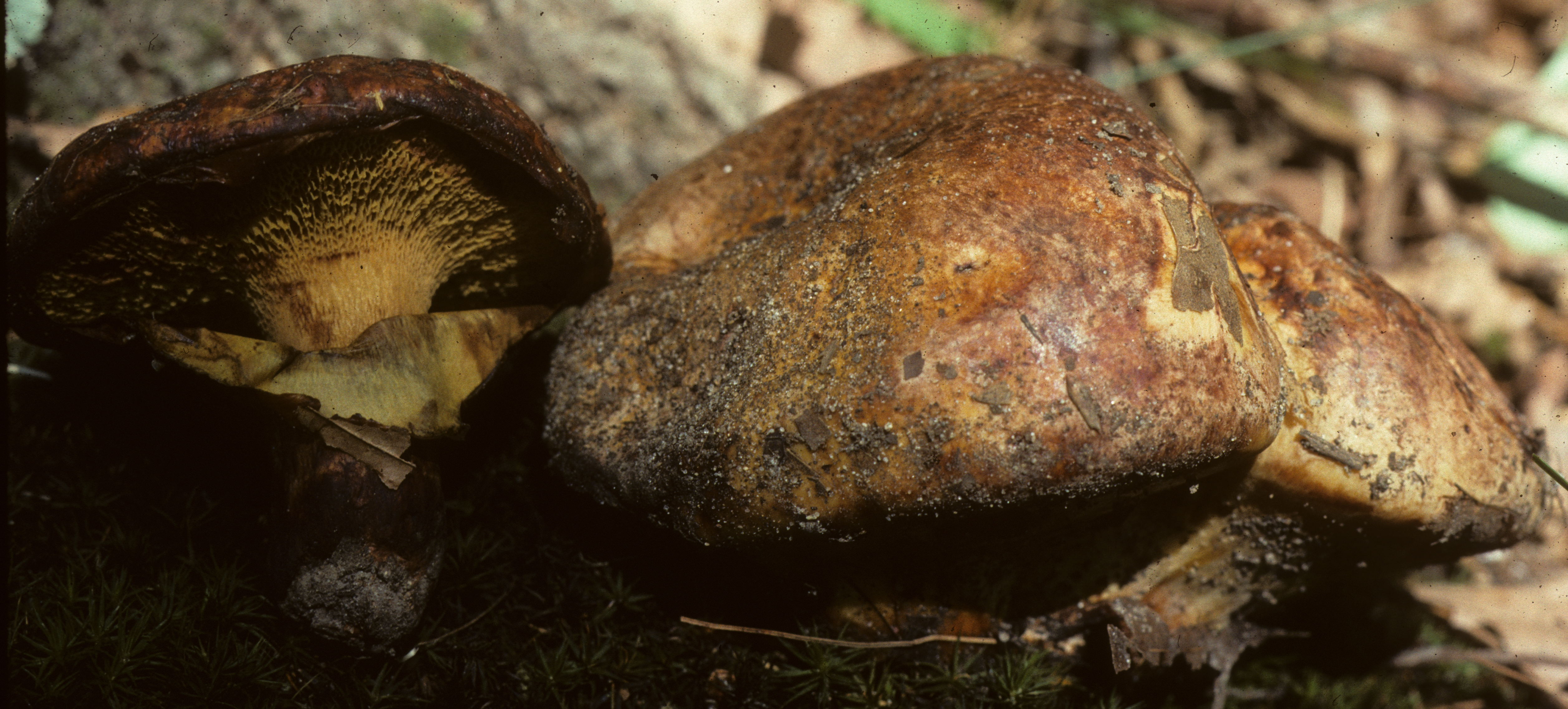
- Paragyrodon sphaerosporus

Scientific classification
- Kingdom: Fungi
- Division: Basidiomycota
- Class: Agaricomycetes
- Order: Boletales
- Family: Paxillaceae
- Genus: Paragyrodon (Singer) Singer (1942)
- Species: P. sphaerosporus

Binomial name
- Paragyrodon sphaerosporus (Peck) Singer (1942)

Synonyms
- Ixocomus sphaerosporus (Peck) E.-J.Gilbert (1931); Gyrodon sphaerosporus (Peck) Singer (1940); Suillus sphaerosporus (Peck) A.H.Sm. & Thiers (1964)

= Paragyrodon =

Genus of fungi

Paragyrodon sphaerosporus Mycological characteristics
- Pores on hymenium
- Cap is infundibuliform
- Hymenium is adnate
- Stipe has a cortina
- Spore print is yellow-brown
- Ecology is mycorrhizal
- Edibility is unknown

Paragyrodon is a genus of fungi in the family Paxillaceae. It is a monotypic genus, containing the single species Paragyrodon sphaerosporus. Paragyrodon was circumscribed by Rolf Singer in 1942.

== Description ==
The caps are 4–12 centimetres (1 1/2–4 3/4 in) wide and a blotchy combination of yellow to brown. The stem is 3–7 cm (1 1/4–2 3/4 in) tall and 1.2–3 cm (1/2–1 1/4 in) thick; it stains brown.

== Distribution and habitat ==
The species is distributed mostly around the Great Lakes Region, however, the species has also been observed further west in Kansas, Iowa and Colorado. The species has been associated with the white oak and the gambel oak in Colorado.
