= Tylopilus ammiratii =

Scientific classification
- Domain: Eukaryota
- Kingdom: Fungi
- Division: Basidiomycota
- Class: Agaricomycetes
- Order: Boletales
- Family: Boletaceae
- Genus: Tylopilus
- Species: T. ammiratii

Binomial name
- Tylopilus ammiratii Thiers (1975)

Species of fungus

Tylopilus ammiratii is a fungus of the genus Tylopilus found in California, where it fruits scattered or in groups under black oak. Fruiting occurs from October to December. It was described as new to science by mycologist Harry Delbert Thiers in 1975. The type collection was made in Shasta County in November 1971 by Joseph Ammirati, for whom the species is named.

Fruit bodies of T. ammiratii have convex, brownish caps measuring 5–10 cm (2.0–3.9 in) in diameter. The pore surface on the cap underside is initially white before turning to brown in maturity. They number about 1–2 per millimeter, and will stain vinaceous to brown when injured. The stipe measures 4–9 cm (1.6–3.5 in) long by 1.5–2.5 cm (0.6–1.0 in) thick. It has a smooth to slightly scurfy surface (i.e., covered with tiny flakes), and generally lack reticulations, although occasionally the stipe apex is slightly reticulate. Spores are smooth-walled, somewhat spindle-shaped (subfusoid) to cylindric, and typically measure 8.6–11.4 by 3.3–4 μm. Closely related Tylopilus species include T. indecisus and T. ferrugineus.

== See also ==
- List of North American boletes
