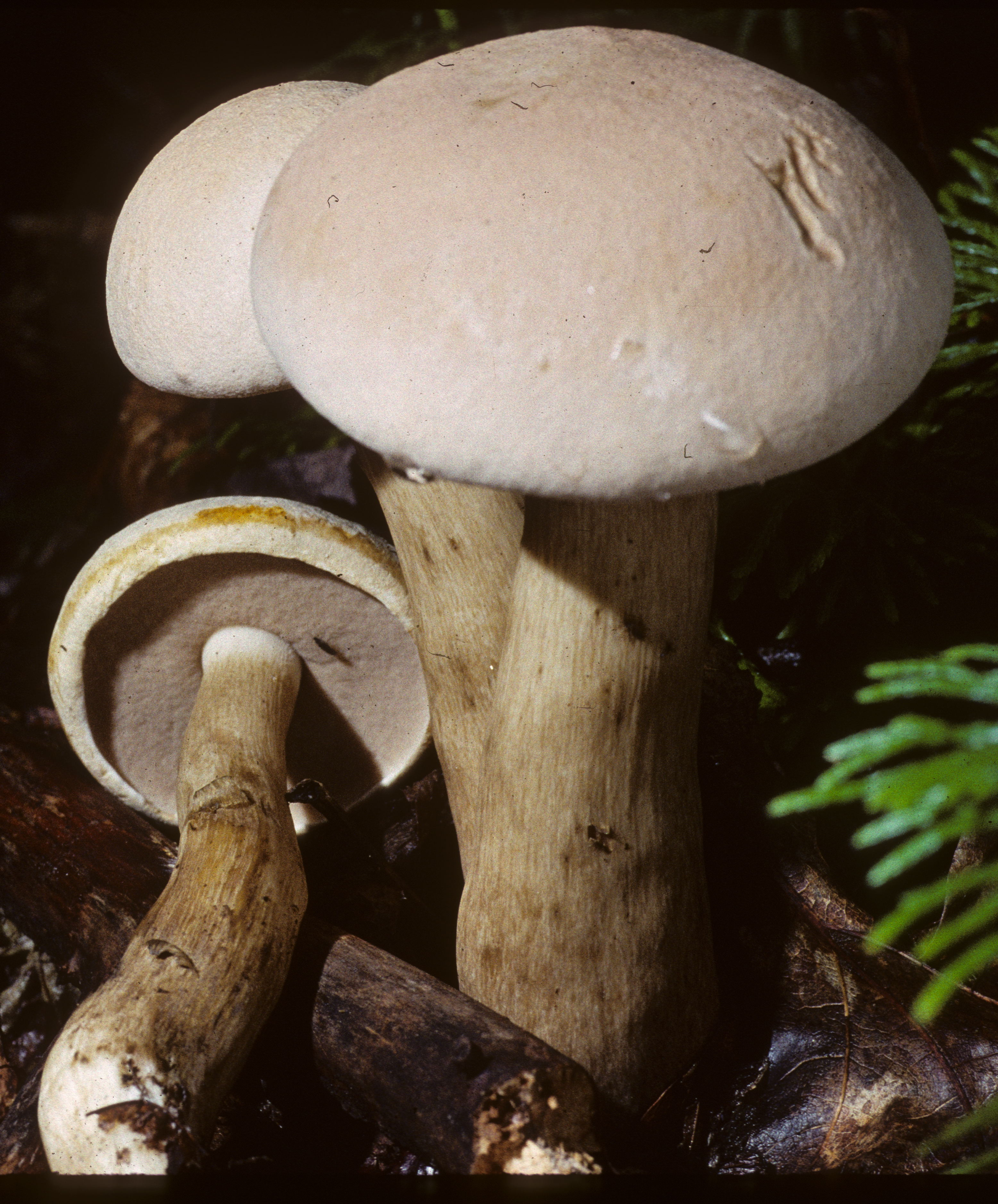

Scientific classification
- Domain: Eukaryota
- Kingdom: Fungi
- Division: Basidiomycota
- Class: Agaricomycetes
- Order: Boletales
- Family: Boletaceae
- Genus: Tylopilus
- Species: T. intermedius

Binomial name
- Tylopilus intermedius A.H.Sm. & Thiers (1971)

= Tylopilus intermedius =

Species of fungus

Tylopilus intermedius, commonly known as the bitter parchment bolete, is a bolete fungus in the family Boletaceae native to the eastern United States.

== Taxonomy ==
The bolete was first officially described in Alexander H. Smith and Harry D. Thiers' 1971 monograph of boletes in the Michigan area. The specific epithet intermedius refers to its intermediate appearance between Tylopilus peralbidus and T. rhoadsiae. It is commonly known as the "bitter parchment bolete".

== Description ==
The fruit bodies have caps that are broadly convex to flat in maturity, reaching a diameter of 6–15 cm (2.4–5.9 in) wide. The cap margin is curved inward in young fruit bodies, and has a thin band of sterile (non-reproductive) tissue. The cap surface is uneven and often wrinkled. Initially whitish, it sometimes develops pinkish tones and brownish stains in age. The pores on the cap underside are initially white but become pinkish as the spores mature. The pores are roughly circular, measuring about 1 or 2 per millimeter; the tubes are 1–1.5 cm (0.4–0.6 in) deep. The club-shaped stipe measures 8–14 cm (3.1–5.5 in) long by 1–4 cm (0.4–1.6 in) thick. It is white or whitish like the cap, and also develops brownish stains in age. Reticulation (a mesh-like pattern) on the stipe is variable. The flesh is firm and white, and slowly stains brown where it has been cut; the staining reaction may take up to an hour or more to occur. It has no distinctive odor and a bitter taste that renders it inedible.

The spore print is pinkish brown. Spores are nearly oblong, smooth, hyaline (translucent) to pale brown, and measure 10–15 by 3–5 μm. The caps of young fruit bodies will stain pinkish when a drop of iron(II) sulfate (FeSO_{4}) solution is applied.

== Habitat and distribution ==
Fruit bodies of Tylopilus intermedius grow on the ground scattered or in groups under deciduous trees, especially oak. Found in eastern North America, the true distribution limits of the bolete are unknown, but it has been collected from the US states of New England south to North Carolina, and west to Michigan.

== See also ==
- List of North American boletes
