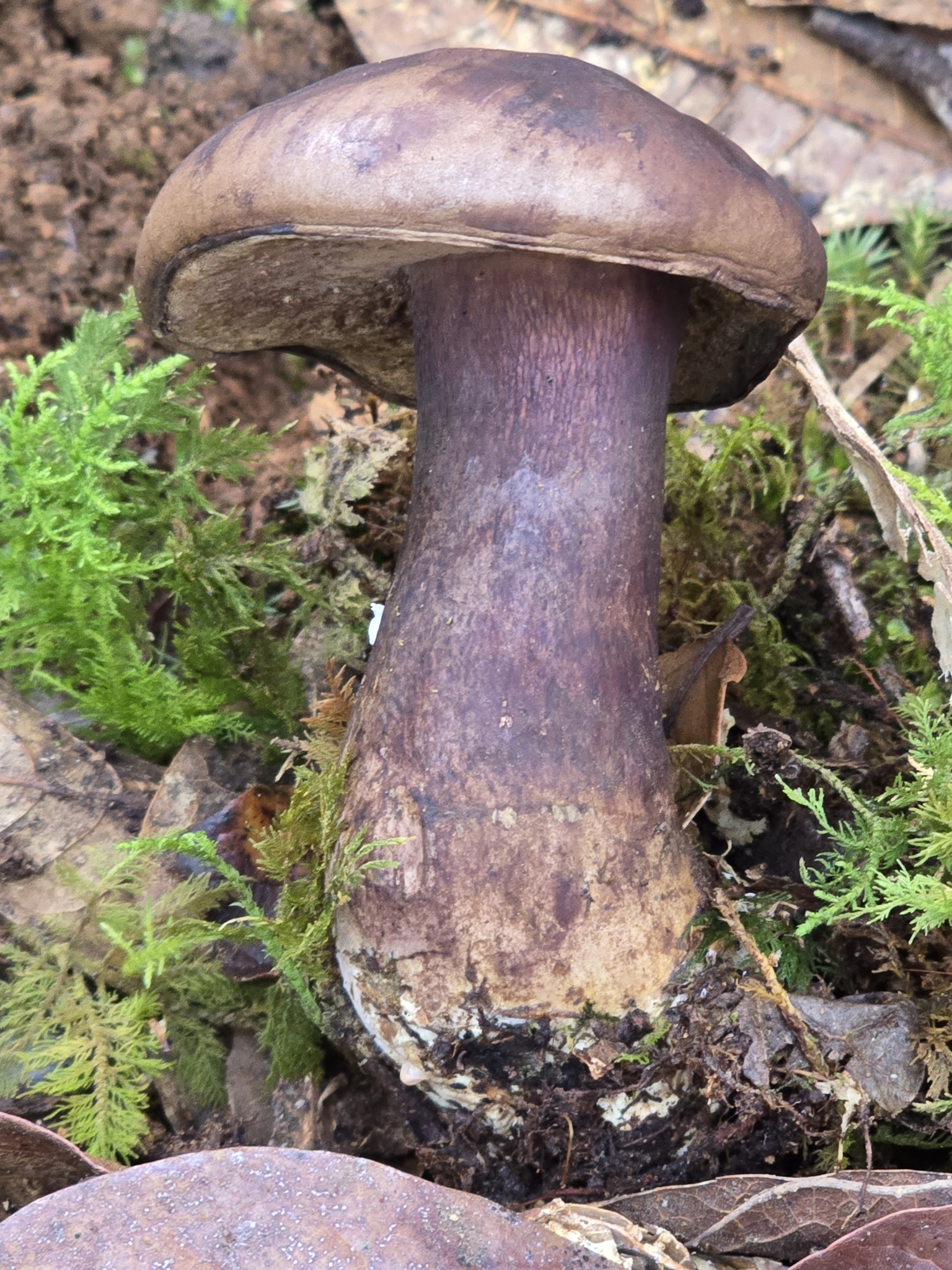

Scientific classification
- Kingdom: Fungi
- Division: Basidiomycota
- Class: Agaricomycetes
- Order: Boletales
- Family: Boletaceae
- Genus: Tylopilus
- Species: T. bulbosus

Binomial name
- Tylopilus bulbosus Halling & G.M.Muell. (2001)

= Tylopilus bulbosus =

Species of fungus

Tylopilus bulbosus is a bolete fungus of the genus Tylopilus. Described as new to science in 2001 by mycologists Roy Halling and Greg Mueller, it is found in Costa Rica, where it grows on the ground in montane forests dominated by the oak species Quercus copeyensis, Q. oocarpa, and Q. seemannii. The fungus produces fruit bodies with convex to flattened caps measuring 4.5–11 cm (1.8–4.3 in) in diameter. Its color is initially violet to purplish brown, and eventually fades to brown. The pore surface is initially pale pinkish purple to grayish red, and bruises brown where it has been handled. The white flesh stains pinkish brown where it has been exposed. Spores are more or less spindle shaped (subfusoid), smooth, and measure 10–14 by 4.2–5.6 μm; the fresh spore deposit is pinkish. Morphologically similar Tylopilus species include the eastern North American T. rubrobrunneus and the North and Central American T. williamsii.
