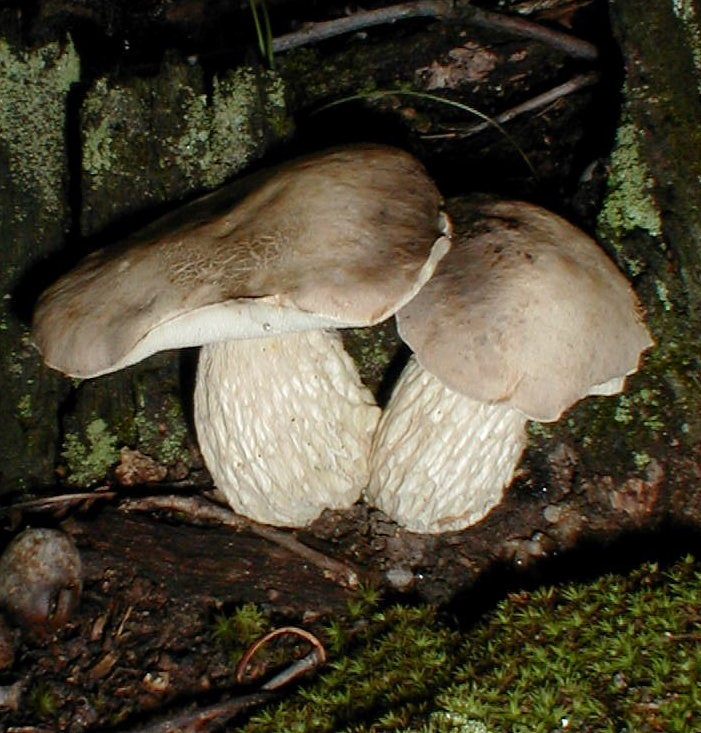
- Pseudoaustroboletus valens

Scientific classification
- Kingdom: Fungi
- Division: Basidiomycota
- Class: Agaricomycetes
- Order: Boletales
- Family: Boletaceae
- Genus: Pseudoaustroboletus; Yan C.Li & Zhu L.Yang (2014)

Type species
- Pseudoaustroboletus valens (Corner) Yan C.Li & Zhu L.Yang (2014)

Synonyms
- Boletus albellus Mass. (1909); Boletus valens Corner (1972); Tylopilus valens (Corner) Hongo & Nagas. (1976)

= Pseudoaustroboletus =

Genus of fungi

Pseudoaustroboletus is a fungal genus in the family Boletaceae. The genus is monotypic, containing the single species Pseudoaustroboletus valens, found in China, Japan, Malaysia and Singapore. It was originally given the name Boletus albellus illegitimately based on specimens from Singapore by George Edward Massee in 1909. In 1972 it was given the name Boletus valens legitimately before being transferred to Tylopilus valens in 1976. A molecular phylogenetics study found it to be distinct from Tylopilus and Boletus and the authors placed it in its own genus, Pseudoaustroboletus.
