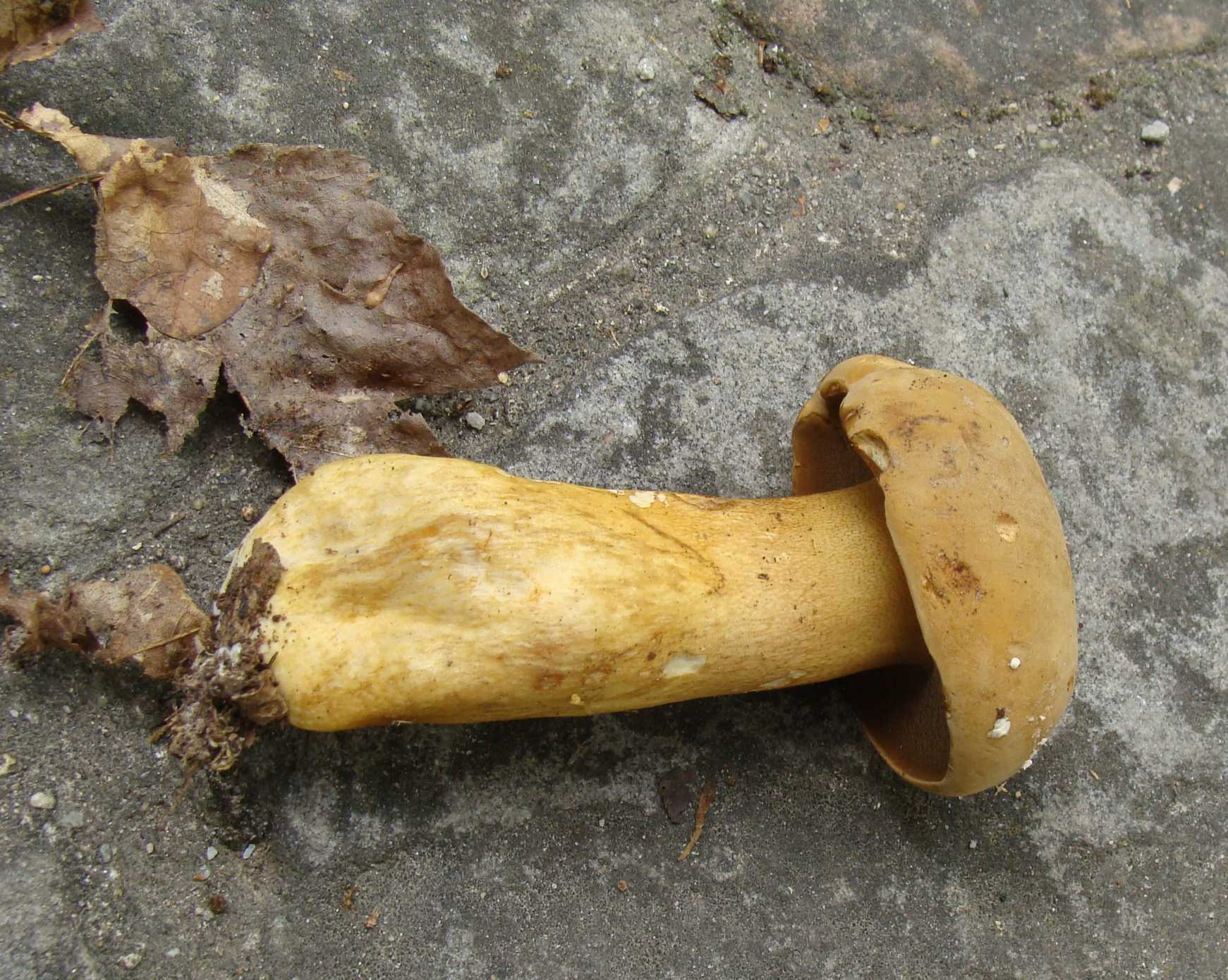

Scientific classification
- Kingdom: Fungi
- Division: Basidiomycota
- Class: Agaricomycetes
- Order: Boletales
- Family: Boletaceae
- Genus: Tylopilus
- Species: T. tabacinus

Binomial name
- Tylopilus tabacinus (Peck) Singer (1944)

Synonyms
- Boletus tabacinus Peck (1896); Ceriomyces tabacinus (Peck) Murrill (1909)

= Tylopilus tabacinus =

Species of fungus

Tylopilus tabacinus Mycological characteristics
- Pores on hymenium
- Cap is convex or flat
- Hymenium is adnate
- Stipe is bare
- Spore print is pinkish-brown to reddish-brown
- Ecology is mycorrhizal
- Edibility is unknown

Tylopilus tabacinus is a species of bolete fungus in the family Boletaceae. It is characterized by a tawny-brown cap measuring up to 17.5 cm (6.9 in) in diameter, and a reticulated stem up to 16.5 cm (6.5 in) long by 6 cm (2.4 in) thick. A characteristic microscopic feature is the distinctive crystalline substance encrusted on the hyphae on the surface of the cap. The species is known from the eastern United States from Florida north to Rhode Island, and west to Mississippi, and from eastern Mexico. It is a mycorrhizal species, and associates with oak and beech trees.

== Taxonomy ==
The species was first described by American mycologist Charles Horton Peck in 1896 under the name Boletus tabacinus. Peck collected the type specimens in red clay on the bank of a roadside ditch in Alabama. William Alphonso Murrill transferred the species to his then newly described genus Ceriomyces in 1909; this genus has since been subsumed into Boletus. Rolf Singer moved the species to Tylopilus in 1944. Although Singer considered B. tabacinus to be the same species as Boletus pisciodorus, this opinion was contested by William Alphonso Murrill, who, after examining the type specimens of both species, considered them to be distinct. Murrill's conclusion was later corroborated by Alexander H. Smith and Harry D. Thiers in the 1971 monograph of boletes. In 1945, Singer defined the varieties amarus and dubius that he collected in Florida.

== Description ==
The caps of the fruit body initially have a rounded shape, but later become broadly convex and eventually flattened in age; they reach dimensions of 4.5–17.5 cm (1.8–6.9 in) wide. The color ranges from yellowish brown to orangish brown to tobacco brown. The cap surface is dry with a somewhat velvet-like texture, although in larger specimens the surface is areolate (divided into small areas by cracks). The cap margin is even and wavy.

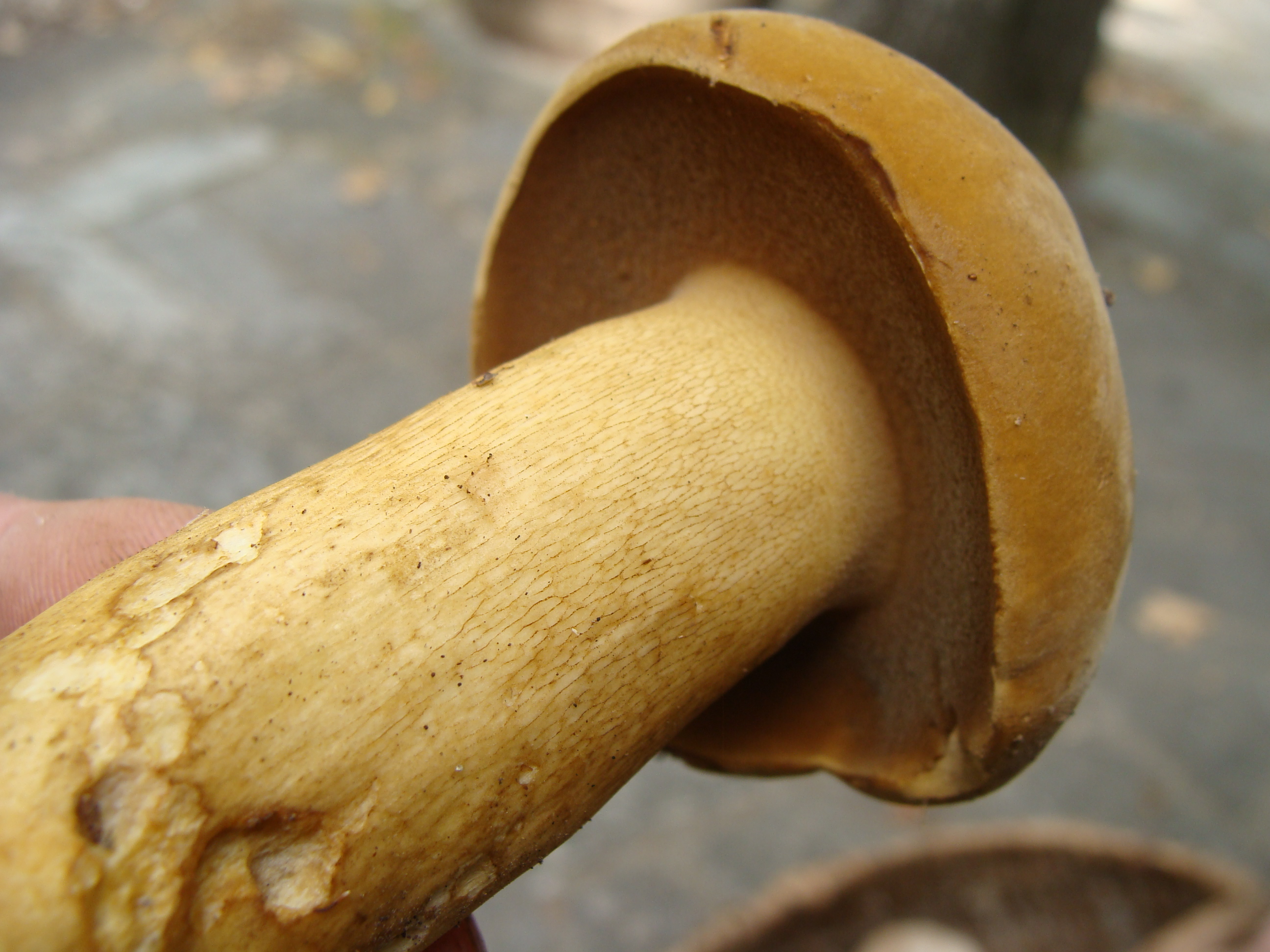
The upper portion of the stem is reticulate.

The tubes on the underside of the cap (comprising the hymenium) are dark brown to cinnamon-brown. The angular to circular pores are lighter in color than the tubes and number about 1–2 pores per millimeter, while the tubes are up to 1.4 cm (0.55 in) long. The pore surface is depressed around the stem. The cap flesh is white, but typically stains purplish buff or pinkish buff when cut. The stipe typically measures 4–16.5 cm (1.6–6.5 in) by 2.5–6 cm (1.0–2.4 in) thick. When young, it is bulbous, but matures to become more or less equal in width throughout. Its color is roughly the same as the cap, although it tends to be slightly darker in the upper portion, where it is reticulate (covered with a net-like patterns of ridges). The odor of the mushroom has been described variously as "not distinctive, fruity, fishy, or pungent", while the taste is indistinct to slightly bitter. The edibility of the mushroom is unknown. The variety amarus is similar in appearance, but has bitter-tasting flesh, while variety dubius has a lighter colored-cap and less distinctive reticulations on the apex of the stem.

Fruit bodies produce a spore print ranging in color from pinkish brown to reddish brown. The spores measure 10–17 by 3.5–4.5 μm, and are fusoid (somewhat spindle-shaped) to elliptical. Spores have a smooth surface, and a plage (a depressed area where the spore was once attached to the basidium via the sterigma). The spore walls are thin, up to 0.2 μm. They are pale yellow to cream green in a solution of potassium hydroxide, pale yellow-rust in Melzer's reagent, and blue in Methyl blue; without stain, they appear hyaline to pale yellow. The cap cuticle is an interwoven trichodermium—a cellular arrangement whereby the hyphae are of roughly equal length and arranged perpendicularly to the surface. The terminal (end) cells of the trichodermium are 6.5–11.5 μm in diameter, and roughly equal in width throughout their length. They are encrusted with a crystalline substance, a feature that is uncommon in the Boletaceae. The hyphae of the tubes are 5.0–13.0 μm in diameter. Clamp connections are absent from the hyphae.

The basidia (spore-bearing cells) of T. tabacinus are club-shaped and measure 23.5–37.0 by 8.5–13.0 μm. The pleurocystidia (cystidia found on the inner surface of the tubes) are 45.0–60.0 by 6.5–12.5 μm, lanceolate (lance-shaped) to narrowly fusoid-ventricose (enlarged in the middle and somewhat spindle-shaped). Cheilocystidia (cystidia on the outer edges of the tubes) are absent. The caulocystidia (cystidia on the stem) form the reticulations on the stem; they are usually club-shaped and measure 21.0–40.5 by 6.5–10.5 μm.

=== Similar species ===
Boletus pisciodorus is similar in form to Tylopilus tabacinus. Unlike, T. tabacinus however, B. pisciodorus has spores that are hyaline in mass, and dark yellowish brown rather than hyaline when viewed with a light microscope. Further, B. pisciodorus has a fishy odor that is apparent in both fresh and dried specimens.

== Habitat and distribution ==
Tylopilus tabacinus forms ectomycorrhizal associations with oaks, and fruit bodies are usually found solitarily, scattered, or in groups on sandy soil under oaks or in mixed oak-pine woods from July to September. In the United States, the mushroom is distributed from Florida north to Rhode Island, and west to Mississippi. It has also been collected from a montane cloud forest of Mexican Beech (Fagus grandifolia var. mexicana) in the state of Hidalgo, Mexico. The occurrence of the mushroom is "occasional to fairly common". The varieties amarus and dubius are rare, known only from their original collection locations in Gainesville, Florida.

== See also ==
- List of North American boletes
