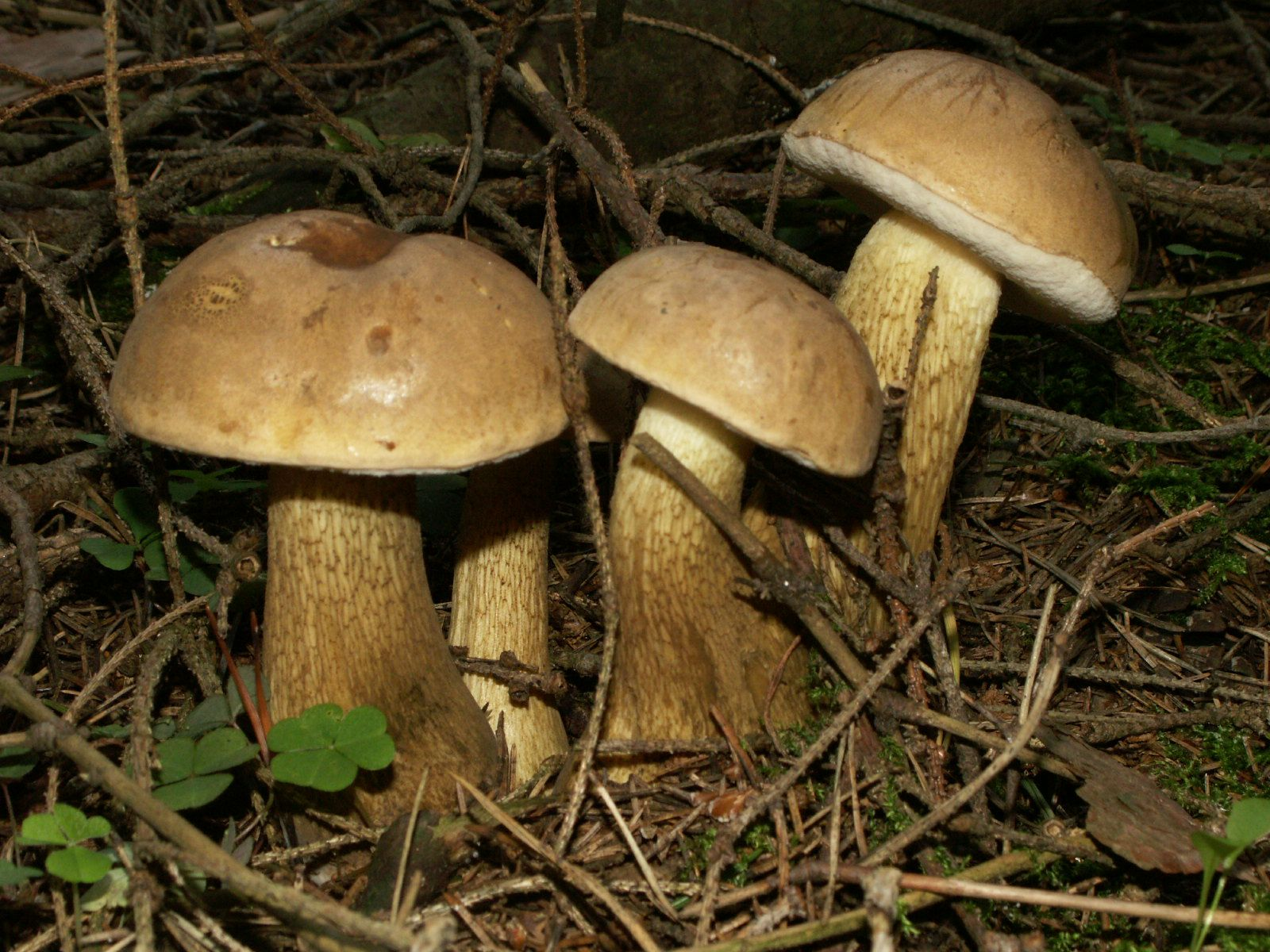
- Tylopilus felleus

Scientific classification
- Kingdom: Fungi
- Division: Basidiomycota
- Class: Agaricomycetes
- Order: Boletales
- Family: Boletaceae
- Genus: Tylopilus; P.Karst. (1881)

Type species
- Tylopilus felleus (Bull.) P.Karst. (1881)

Synonyms
- Dictyopus Quél. (1886); Rhodoporus Quél. ex Bataille (1908); Rhodobolites Beck (1923); Leucogyroporus Snell (1942)

= Tylopilus =

Genus of fungi

Tylopilus is a genus of over 150 species of mycorrhizal bolete fungi separated from Boletus. Its best known member is the bitter bolete (Tylopilus felleus), the only species found in Europe. More species are found in North America, such as the edible species T. alboater. Australia is another continent where many species are found. All members of the genus form mycorrhizal relationships with trees. Members of the genus are distinguished by their pinkish pore surfaces.

== Taxonomy ==
The genus was first defined by Petter Adolf Karsten in 1881. The type species, Tylopilus felleus, was originally described in 1788 as a species of Boletus by French mycologist Pierre Bulliard. Tylopilus means "bumpy or swollen pileus", from the Greek tylos "bump" and pilos "hat".

Molecular analysis indicates the genus, like other large genera within the Boletales, is polyphyletic. A lineage of Tylopilus chromapes (now Harrya chromapes and related species) has been shown to be only distantly related to other members of Tylopilus. Hence T. chromapes is now the type species of the new genus Harrya and, related to it, several Australian species moved to Australopilus. T. valens was also moved to its own genus, Pseudoaustroboletus.

== Description ==
Fruit bodies of the genus Tylopilus are encountered as large stout bolete mushrooms, which generally arise from the ground or occasionally from wood. They have stout stipes, which do not have a ring. A key field character which distinguishes them from members of the genus Boletus is the presence of their pink-tinged pores (though these may be white when young). The "pink pore" feature is a polyphyletic morphology that does not unite the Tylopilus species using traditional morphological characters (Smith and Thiers or Singer's concepts). The spore print manifests various shades of pinkish-brown, through reddish-brown and even chocolate brown.

== Edibility ==
Many species have a bitter-metallic taste and are thus inedible, taste being a key feature in the identification of boletes. The black velvet bolete (T. alboater) is a good edible, but is often ignored.

== Species ==
As of September 2026, Index Fungorum recognises 150 species in the genus Tylopilus. At least 40 are found in western North America. A large number have been recorded from Australia, with 26 aligned with existing taxa and another 15 not assignable. Members of the genus are also abundant in South America, particularly in forests with trees of the genus Dicymbe in Guyana, as well as Central America and elsewhere across tropical regions around the world. All are mycorrhizal.

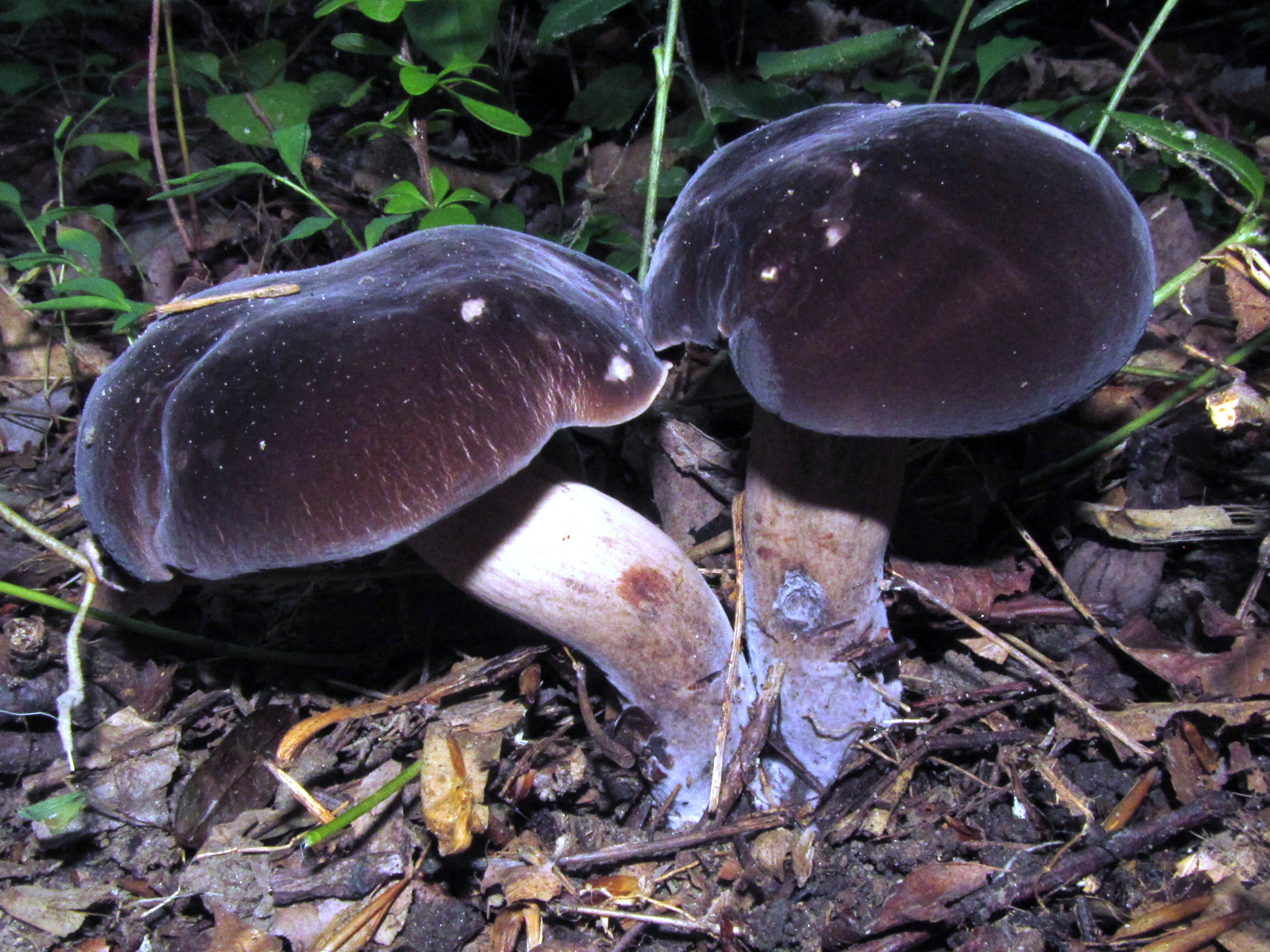
Tylopilus alboater

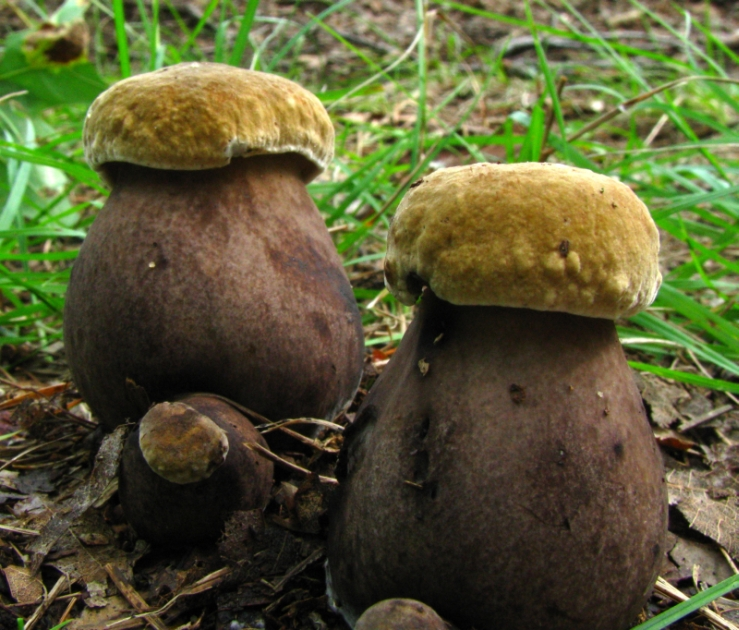
Tylopilus atronicotianus

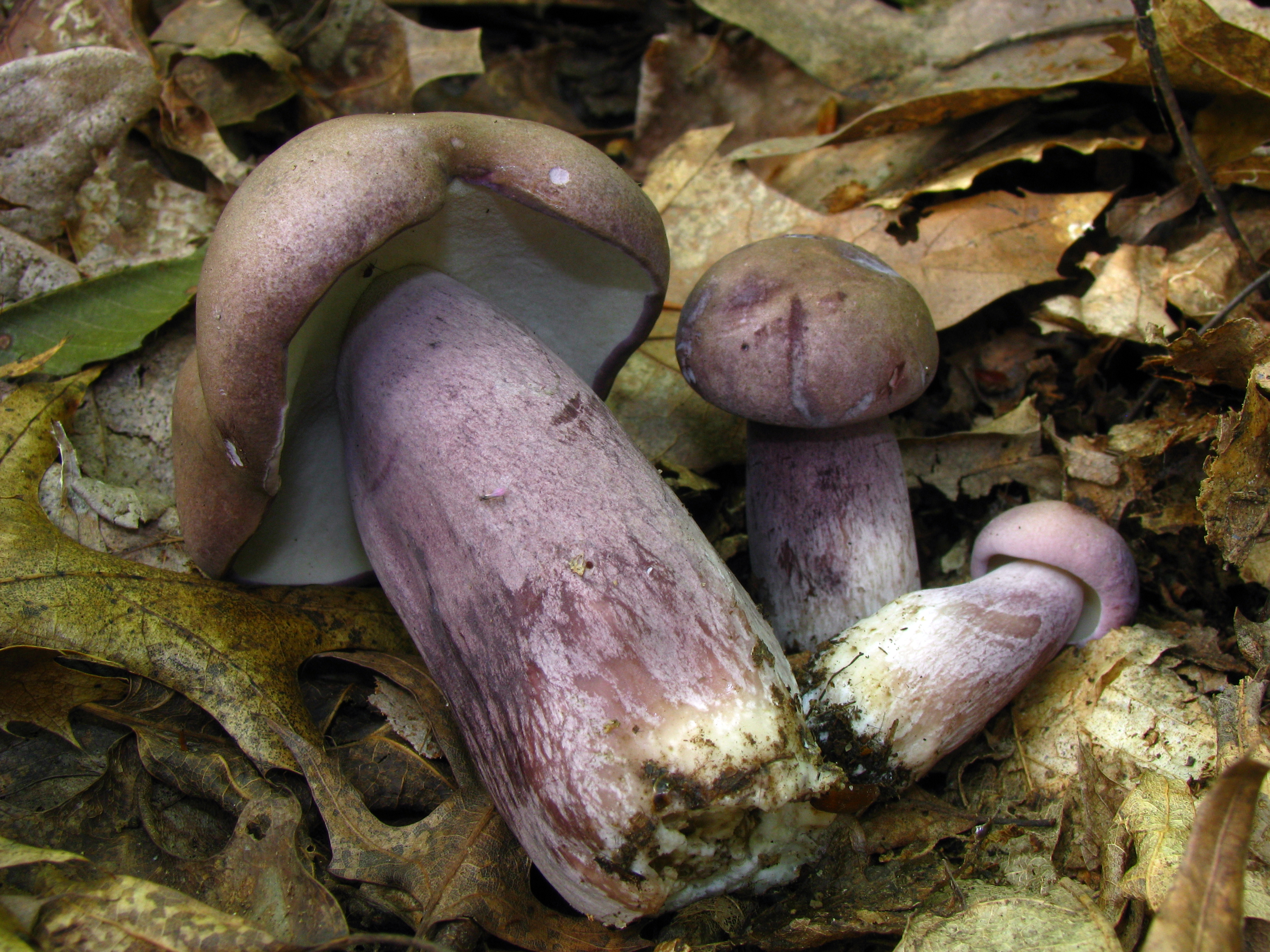
Tylopilus plumbeoviolaceus

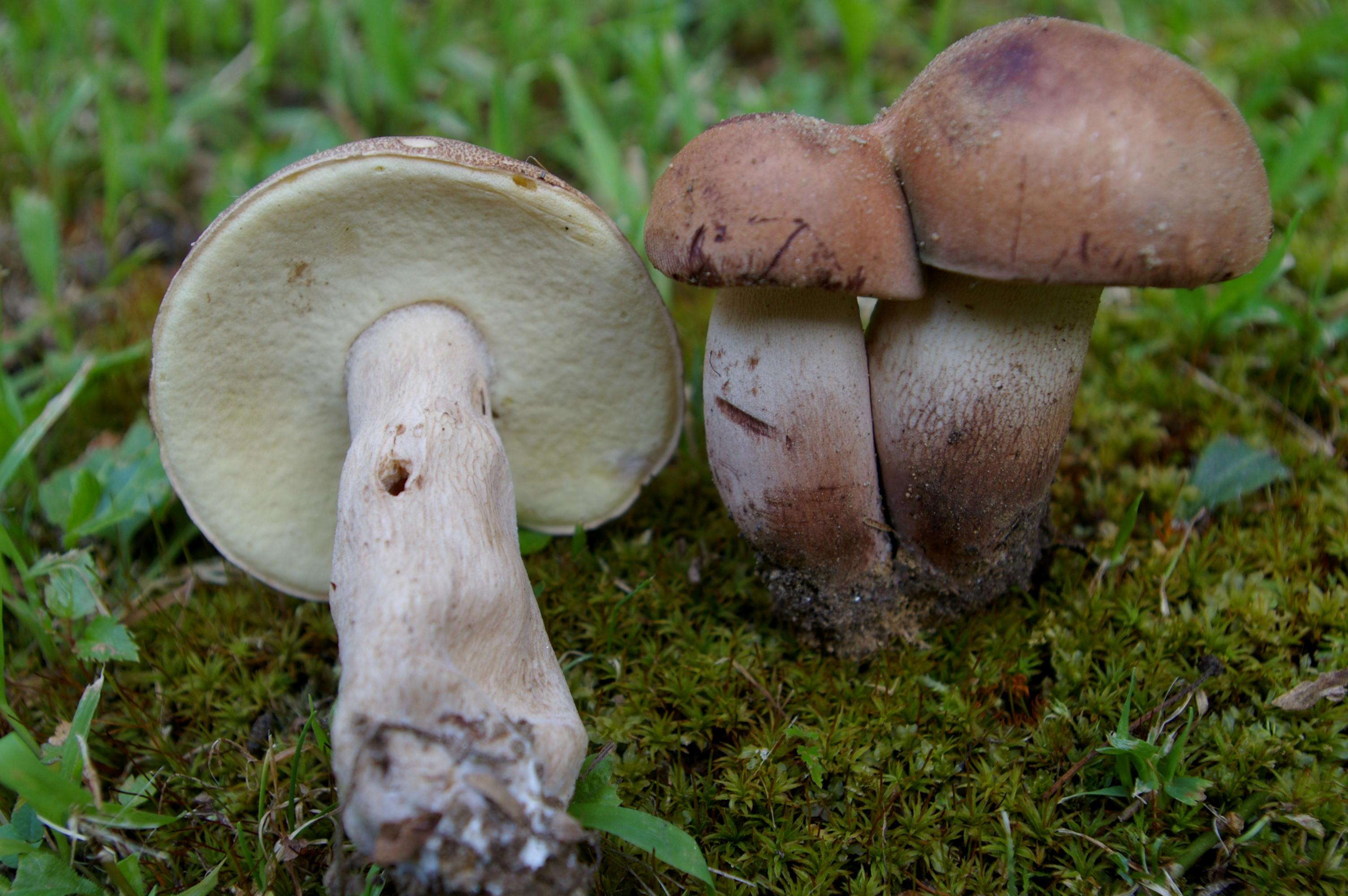
Tylopilus variobrunneus

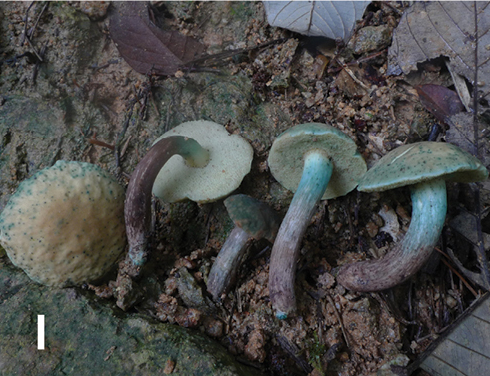
Tylopilus virescens

- Tylopilus acutesquamosus Singer (1983)
- Tylopilus albirubens (Corner) E. Horak (2011)
- Tylopilus alboater (Schwein.) Murrill (1909)
- Tylopilus albofarinaceus (W.F. Chiu) F.L. Tai (1979)
- Tylopilus albopurpureus Yan C. Li & Zhu L. Yang (2021)
- Tylopilus alkalixanthus Halling & Amtoft (2003)
- Tylopilus alpinus Yan C. Li & Zhu L. Yang (2016)
- Tylopilus alutaceoumbrinus Hongo (1971)
- Tylopilus ammiratii Thiers (1975)
- Tylopilus appalachiensis Singer (1948)
- Tylopilus aquarius (Singer) Wartchow, Barb.-Silva, B. Ortiz & Ovrebo (2017)
- Tylopilus arenarius Singer (1978)
- Tylopilus argentatae (Corner) E. Horak (2011)
- Tylopilus argillaceus Hongo (1985)
- Tylopilus ascendens (Corner) E. Horak (2011)
- Tylopilus atratus Both (1998)
- Tylopilus atripurpureus (Corner) E. Horak (2011)
- Tylopilus atrobrunneus (Lj.N. Vassiljeva) Wolfe (1980)
- Tylopilus atronicotianus Both (1998)
- Tylopilus atroviolaceobrunneus Yan C. Li & Zhu L. Yang (2016)
- Tylopilus aurantiacus Yan C. Li & Zhu L. Yang (2021)
- Tylopilus aurantitubus (Corner) E. Horak (2011)
- Tylopilus austrofelleus (Cleland) Watling & N.M. Greg. (1988)
- Tylopilus badiceps (Peck) A.H. Sm. & Thiers (1971)
- Tylopilus balloui (Peck) Singer (1947)
- Tylopilus beelii Heinem. & Gooss.-Font. (1951)
- Tylopilus brachypus Singer, J. García & L.D. Gómez (1991)
- Tylopilus brevisporus Watling & T.H. Li (1999)
- Tylopilus brunneirubens (Corner) Watling & E. Turnbull (1994)
- Tylopilus bulbosus Halling & G.M. Muell. (2001)
- Tylopilus callainus N.K. Zeng, Zhi Q. Liang & M.S. Su (2018)
- Tylopilus castanoides Har. Takah. (2002)
- Tylopilus cellulosus Singer (1947)
- Tylopilus cervicolor (Corner) E. Horak (2011)
- Tylopilus cervinicoccineus (Corner) E. Horak (2011)
- Tylopilus chromoreticulatus Wolfe & Bougher (1993)
- Tylopilus corneri Singer, J. García & L.D. Gómez (1991)
- Tylopilus costaricensis Singer & L.D. Gómez (1991)
- Tylopilus cremeus (Corner) E. Horak (2011)
- Tylopilus cutifractus (Corner) E. Horak (2011)
- Tylopilus cyanescens T.H. Li & Watling (1999)
- Tylopilus cyanogranulifer T.H. Li, Watling & N.M. Greg. (1999)
- Tylopilus dunensis Magnago & M.A. Neves (2017)
- Tylopilus exiguus T.W. Henkel (1999)
- Tylopilus felleus (Bull.) P. Karst. (1881)
- Tylopilus ferrugineus (Kuntze) Singer (1947)
- Tylopilus fuligineoviolaceus Har. Takah. (2007)
- Tylopilus funerarius (Massee) Pegler & T.W.K. Young (1981)
- Tylopilus fuscatus (Corner) Yan C. Li & Zhu L. Yang (2021)
- Tylopilus fuscescens Watling (1991)
- Tylopilus glutinosus Iqbal Hosen (2021)
- Tylopilus gomezii Singer (1991)
- Tylopilus griseipurpureus (Corner) E. Horak (2011)
- Tylopilus griseiviridus Yan C. Li & Zhu L. Yang (2021)
- Tylopilus griseocarneus Wolfe & Halling (1989)
- Tylopilus griseolivaceus Angelini, Gelardi, Costanzo & Vizzini (2019)
- Tylopilus griseolus Yan C. Li & Zhu L. Yang (2021)
- Tylopilus guanacastensis Singer (1983)
- Tylopilus hayatae Rodríguez-Ramírez & Luna-Vega (2020)
- Tylopilus himalayanus D. Chakr., K. Das & Vizzini (2018)
- Tylopilus hondurensis Singer & M.H. Ivory (1983)
- Tylopilus hongoi Wolfe & Bougher (1993)
- Tylopilus humilis Thiers (1967)
- Tylopilus intermedius A.H. Sm. & Thiers (1971)
- Tylopilus isabellescens Murrill (1946)
- Tylopilus jalapensis Singer & J. García (1991)
- Tylopilus javanicus Henn. (1898)
- Tylopilus jiangxiensis Kuan Zhao & Yan C. Li (2020)
- Tylopilus leucomycelinus (Singer & M.H. Ivory) R. Flores & Simonini (2000)
- Tylopilus lividobrunneus Singer (1973)
- Tylopilus louisii Heinem. (1964)
- Tylopilus microsporus S.Z. Fu, Q.B. Wang & Y.J. Yao (2006)
- Tylopilus minor Singer (1945)
- Tylopilus mitissimus Singer & L.D. Gómez (1991)
- Tylopilus montanus Singer (1989)
- Tylopilus montoyae Singer & J. García (1991)
- Tylopilus nebulosus (Peck) Wolfe (1980)
- Tylopilus neofelleus Hongo (1967)
- Tylopilus nicaraguensis Singer & M.H. Ivory (1983)
- Tylopilus nigricans Singer (1947)
- Tylopilus nigripes A. Barbosa-Silva & Wartchow (2019)
- Tylopilus obscureviolaceus Har. Takah. (2004)
- Tylopilus obscurus Halling (1989)
- Tylopilus ochraceosquamosus Watling (1994)
- Tylopilus olivaceirubens (Corner) E. Horak (2011)
- Tylopilus olivaceobrunneus Yan C. Li & Zhu L. Yang (2021)
- Tylopilus olivaceoporus T.H. Li, Watling. & N. M. Greg. (1999)
- Tylopilus oradivensis Osmundson & Halling (2010)
- Tylopilus orsonianus Fulgenzi & T.W. Henkel (2007)
- Tylopilus otsuensis Hongo (1966)
- Tylopilus pachycephalus (Massee) Singer (1983)
- Tylopilus pakaraimensis T.W. Henkel (2001)
- Tylopilus peralbidus (Snell & Beardslee) Murrill (1938)
- Tylopilus pernanus (Pat. & C.F. Baker) Watling (2000)
- Tylopilus perplexus Watling (1994)
- Tylopilus phaeoruber Yan C. Li & Zhu L. Yang (2021)
- Tylopilus phaseolisporus (T.H. Li, R.N. Hilton & Watling) Osmundson, Bougher, R. Rob. & Halling (2021)
- Tylopilus piniphilus Wolfe & Bougher (1993)
- Tylopilus pisciodorus (Murrill) Murrill (1948)
- Tylopilus plumbeoviolaceoides T.H. Li, B. Song & Y.H. Shen (2002)
- Tylopilus plumbeoviolaceus (Snell & E.A. Dick) Snell & E.A. Dick (1941)
- Tylopilus potamogeton Singer (1978)
- Tylopilus praeanisatus (Murrill) Murrill (1948)
- Tylopilus primulinus (Corner) E. Horak (2011)
- Tylopilus pseudoalpinus Yan C. Li & Zhu L. Yang (2021)
- Tylopilus pseudoballoui D. Chakr., K. Das & Vizzini (2018)
- Tylopilus psittacinus E. Horak (2011)
- Tylopilus punctatofumosus (W.F. Chiu) F.L. Tai (1979)
- Tylopilus purpureorubens Yan C. Li & Zhu L. Yang (2021)
- Tylopilus pygmaeus Magnago & R.M.B. Silveira (2017)
- Tylopilus rhoadsiae (Murrill) Murrill (1944)
- Tylopilus rhodoconius (Singer) T.J. Baroni, Both & Bessette (1998)
- Tylopilus rigens Hongo (1979)
- Tylopilus rubriporus (Corner) E. Horak (2011)
- Tylopilus rubrobrunneus Mazzer & A.H. Sm. (1967)
- Tylopilus rubrotinctus Yan C. Li & Zhu L. Yang (2021)
- Tylopilus rufobrunneus Yan C. Li & Zhu L. Yang (2021)
- Tylopilus rufonigricans T.W. Henkel (1999)
- Tylopilus rugulosoreticulatus Hongo (1979)
- Tylopilus sanctae-rosae Singer (1983)
- Tylopilus snellii Wolfe (1983)
- Tylopilus striatulus Heinem. (1951)
- Tylopilus suavissimus Heinem. & Gooss.-Font. (1951)
- Tylopilus subcellulosus Singer & J. García (1991)
- Tylopilus subfusipes A.H. Sm. (1973)
- Tylopilus subniger Singer, J. García & L.D. Gómez (1991)
- Tylopilus subotsuensis T.H.G. Pham, A.V. Alexandrova & O.V. Morozova (2020)
- Tylopilus subpunctipes (Peck) A.H. Sm. & Thiers (1971), (Porphyrellus indecisus)
- Tylopilus subunicolor E.A. Dick & Snell (1961)
- Tylopilus subvinaceipallidus T.H. Li & Watling (1999)
- Tylopilus sultanii S. Sarwar, Khalid & Niazi (2014)
- Tylopilus tabacinus (Peck) Singer (1944)
- Tylopilus temucensis Palfner (2005)
- Tylopilus tenuis Heinem. (1951)
- Tylopilus tristiculus (Massee) E. Horak (2011)
- Tylopilus tristior (Corner) E. Horak (2011)
- Tylopilus variobrunneus Roody, A.R. Bessette & Bessette (1998)
- Tylopilus veluticeps (Pat. & C.F. Baker) Singer (1947)
- Tylopilus vinaceipallidus (Corner) T.W. Henkel (1999)
- Tylopilus vinaceogriseus Singer, J. García & L.D. Gómez (1991)
- Tylopilus vinosobrunneus Hongo (1979)
- Tylopilus violaceobrunneus Yan C. Li & Zhu L. Yang (2016)
- Tylopilus violaceorubrus Yan C. Li & Zhu L. Yang (2021)
- Tylopilus violaceus Heinem. (1951)
- Tylopilus violatinctus T.J. Baroni & Both (1998)
- Tylopilus virescens (Har. Takah. & Taneyama) N.K. Zeng, H. Chai & Zhi Q. Liang (2019)
- Tylopilus williamsii Singer & J. García (1991)
- Tylopilus zambianus Watling (1994)
