= Tylopilus piniphilus =

Scientific classification
- Domain: Eukaryota
- Kingdom: Fungi
- Division: Basidiomycota
- Class: Agaricomycetes
- Order: Boletales
- Family: Boletaceae
- Genus: Tylopilus
- Species: T. piniphilus

Binomial name
- Tylopilus piniphilus Wolfe & Bougher (1993)

Species of fungus

Tylopilus piniphilus is a bolete fungus in the family Boletaceae found in Yunnan, China, where it grows under the conifer species Pinus yunnanensis and P. densata.
