= Tylopilus rigens =

Scientific classification
- Domain: Eukaryota
- Kingdom: Fungi
- Division: Basidiomycota
- Class: Agaricomycetes
- Order: Boletales
- Family: Boletaceae
- Genus: Tylopilus
- Species: T. rigens

Binomial name
- Tylopilus rigens Hongo (1979)

Species of fungus

Tylopilus rigens is a bolete fungus in the family Boletaceae. Found in Japan, it was described as new to science in 1979 by Tsuguo Hongo.
