= Tylopilus chromoreticulatus =

Scientific classification
- Domain: Eukaryota
- Kingdom: Fungi
- Division: Basidiomycota
- Class: Agaricomycetes
- Order: Boletales
- Family: Boletaceae
- Genus: Tylopilus
- Species: T. chromoreticulatus

Binomial name
- Tylopilus chromoreticulatus Wolfe & Bougher (1993)

Species of fungus

Tylopilus chromoreticulatus is a bolete fungus in the family Boletaceae found in Yunnan, China, where it grows under Pinus densata. It was described as new to science in 1993.
