= Tylopilus suavissimus =

Scientific classification
- Domain: Eukaryota
- Kingdom: Fungi
- Division: Basidiomycota
- Class: Agaricomycetes
- Order: Boletales
- Family: Boletaceae
- Genus: Tylopilus
- Species: T. suavissimus

Binomial name
- Tylopilus suavissimus Heinem. & Gooss.-Font. (1951)

Species of fungus

Tylopilus suavissimus is a bolete fungus in the family Boletaceae. Found in the Belgian Congo, it was described as new to science in 1951 by Paul Heinemann and M. Goossens-Fontana.
