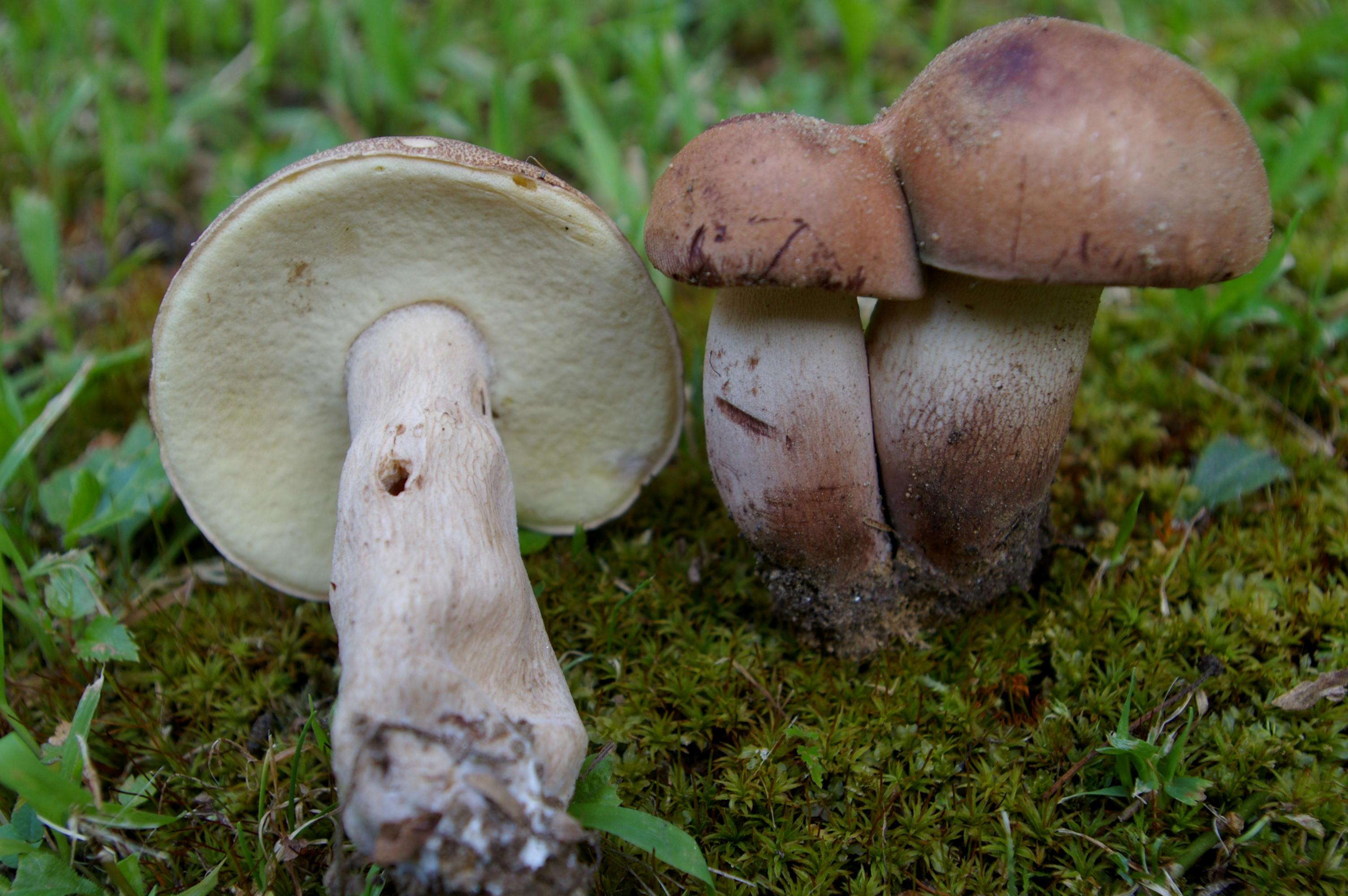

Scientific classification
- Domain: Eukaryota
- Kingdom: Fungi
- Division: Basidiomycota
- Class: Agaricomycetes
- Order: Boletales
- Family: Boletaceae
- Genus: Tylopilus
- Species: T. variobrunneus

Binomial name
- Tylopilus variobrunneus Roody, A.R.Bessette & Bessette (1998)

= Tylopilus variobrunneus =

Species of fungus

Tylopilus variobrunneus is a bolete fungus in the family Boletaceae native to the United States. It was described as new to science in 1998.

== See also ==
- List of North American boletes
