= Tylopilus sanctae-rosae =

Scientific classification
- Domain: Eukaryota
- Kingdom: Fungi
- Division: Basidiomycota
- Class: Agaricomycetes
- Order: Boletales
- Family: Boletaceae
- Genus: Tylopilus
- Species: T. sanctae-rosae

Binomial name
- Tylopilus sanctae-rosae Singer (1983)

Species of fungus

Tylopilus sanctae-rosae is a bolete fungus in the family Boletaceae. Found in Costa Rica, where it grows under the oak species Quercus oleoides, it was described as new to science in 1983 by mycologist Rolf Singer.
