= Tylopilus nebulosus =

Scientific classification
- Domain: Eukaryota
- Kingdom: Fungi
- Division: Basidiomycota
- Class: Agaricomycetes
- Order: Boletales
- Family: Boletaceae
- Genus: Tylopilus
- Species: T. nebulosus

Binomial name
- Tylopilus nebulosus (Peck) Wolfe (1980)

Synonyms
- Boletus nebulosus Peck (1898)

Species of fungus

Tylopilus nebulosus is a species of bolete fungus in the family Boletaceae found in eastern North America. It was originally described by Charles Horton Peck in 1898 as a species of Boletus, from collections made in Ray Brook, New York. Carl B. Wolfe transferred it to the genus Tylopilus in 1980.

== See also ==
- List of North American boletes
