= Tylopilus ochraceosquamosus =

Scientific classification
- Domain: Eukaryota
- Kingdom: Fungi
- Division: Basidiomycota
- Class: Agaricomycetes
- Order: Boletales
- Family: Boletaceae
- Genus: Tylopilus
- Species: T. ochraceosquamosus

Binomial name
- Tylopilus ochraceosquamosus Watling (1994)

Species of fungus

Tylopilus ochraceosquamosus is a bolete fungus of the genus Tylopilus. Described as new to science in 1994 by Scottish mycologist Roy Watling, it is found in Zambia, where it grows on the ground in relic miombo woodland.
