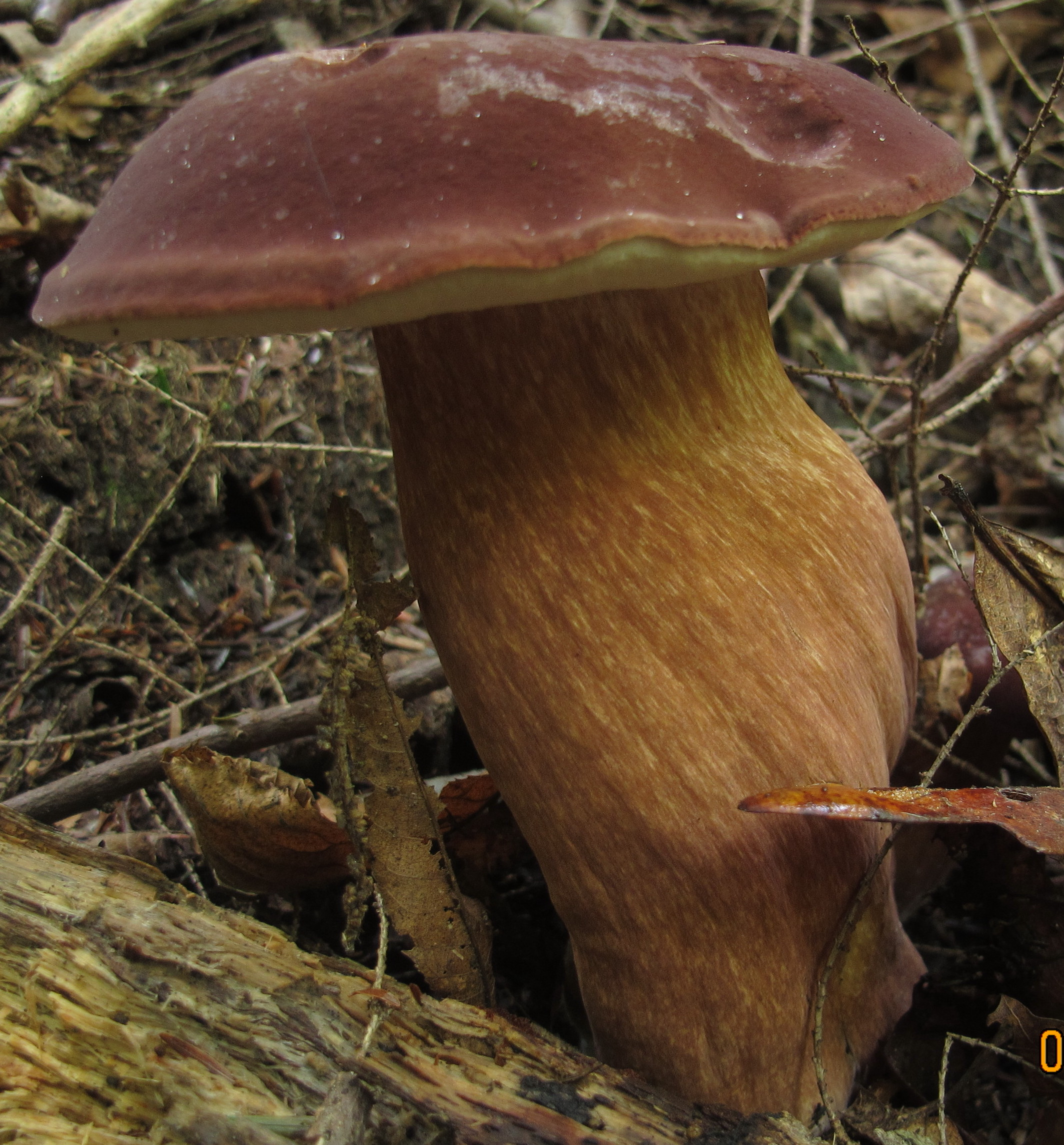

Scientific classification
- Domain: Eukaryota
- Kingdom: Fungi
- Division: Basidiomycota
- Class: Agaricomycetes
- Order: Boletales
- Family: Boletaceae
- Genus: Tylopilus
- Species: T. badiceps

Binomial name
- Tylopilus badiceps (Peck) A.H.Sm. & Thiers (1971)

Synonyms
- Boletus badiceps Peck (1900)

= Tylopilus badiceps =

Species of fungus

Tylopilus badiceps is a bolete fungus in the family Boletaceae native to North America. It was described in 1900 as Boletus badiceps by Charles Horton Peck, and transferred to the genus Tylopilus in 1971 by Alexander H. Smith and Harry Delbert Thiers. It is a good edible mushroom.

== See also ==
- List of North American boletes
