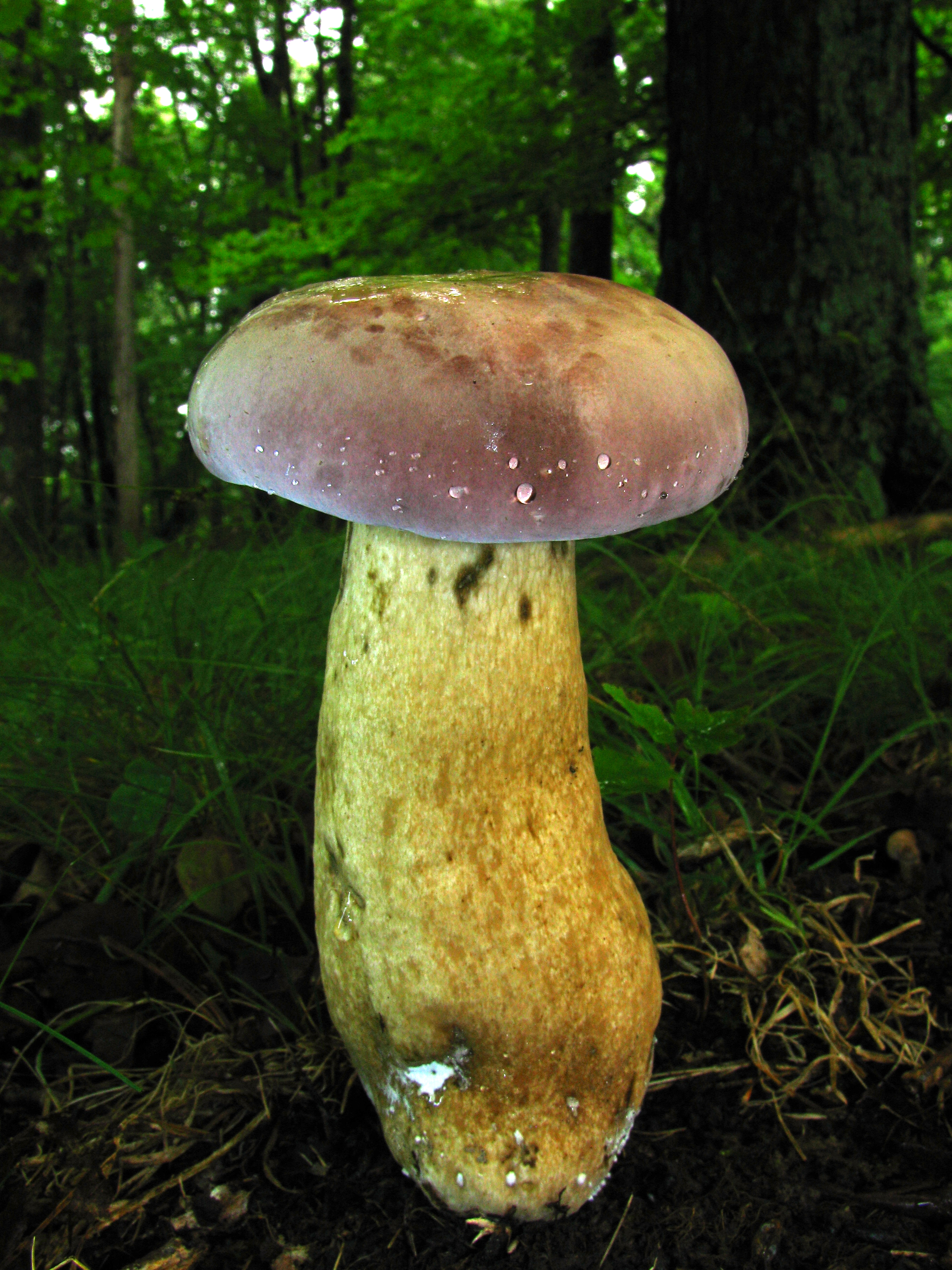

Scientific classification
- Kingdom: Fungi
- Division: Basidiomycota
- Class: Agaricomycetes
- Order: Boletales
- Family: Boletaceae
- Genus: Tylopilus
- Species: T. rubrobrunneus

Binomial name
- Tylopilus rubrobrunneus Mazzer & A.H.Sm. (1967)

= Tylopilus rubrobrunneus =

Species of fungus

Tylopilus rubrobrunneus, commonly known as the reddish brown bitter bolete, is a bolete fungus in the family Boletaceae. It was first described scientifically in 1967 by Samuel J. Mazzer and Alexander H. Smith from collections made in Michigan. The bolete was reported from a Mexican beech (Fagus mexicana) forest in Hidalgo, Mexico in 2010.

The cap is 5–13 centimetres (2–5 in) wide. The stem is 7–13 cm tall and 1.5–3 cm thick. The flesh is white and can bruise yellowish, with a very bitter taste. The spore print is pinkish brown.

It can be found under beech and oak trees in eastern North America from July to September.

The species is inedible.

== See also ==
- List of North American boletes
