= Tylopilus arenarius =

Scientific classification
- Domain: Eukaryota
- Kingdom: Fungi
- Division: Basidiomycota
- Class: Agaricomycetes
- Order: Boletales
- Family: Boletaceae
- Genus: Tylopilus
- Species: T. arenarius

Binomial name
- Tylopilus arenarius Singer (1978)

Species of fungus

Tylopilus arenarius is a bolete fungus in the family Boletaceae. It was described as new to science in 1978 by mycologist Rolf Singer from collections made in Brazil. The bolete fruits singly in humus in campinara, an Amazonian vegetation that grows over leached white sand. It grows in association with plants from the genus Pradosia and the family Leguminosae.
