= Tylopilus subfusipes =

Scientific classification
- Domain: Eukaryota
- Kingdom: Fungi
- Division: Basidiomycota
- Class: Agaricomycetes
- Order: Boletales
- Family: Boletaceae
- Genus: Tylopilus
- Species: T. subfusipes

Binomial name
- Tylopilus subfusipes A.H.Sm. (1973)

Species of fungus

Tylopilus subfusipes is a bolete fungus in the family Boletaceae. It was described as new to science in 1973 by American mycologist Alexander H. Smith. The type collection was found fruiting in groups and clusters under oak in Pinckney, Michigan in 1972.

Fruit bodies of the fungus have smooth, convex to flattened caps measuring 4–8 cm (1.6–3.1 in) in diameter. The color is mottled or uneven, with patches of color including dingy yellow-brown and grayish brown. The cap cuticle can sometimes be peeled off as a translucent layer of tissue. Pores on the cap underside measure about 2 mm in diameter. They are initially whitish before becoming light pink; injury to the pores causes a rusty-vinaceous to dingy brown bruising reaction. The stipe measures 4–8 cm (1.6–3.1 in) long by 1–1.5 cm (0.4–0.6 in) thick at the apex, and tapers in width approaching the base. The spore print is dingy pink; the spores are somewhat oblong to fusoid (spindle-shaped), with dimensions of 10–13.5 by 2.9–3.3 μm.

== See also ==
- List of North American boletes
