= Tylopilus veluticeps =

Scientific classification
- Domain: Eukaryota
- Kingdom: Fungi
- Division: Basidiomycota
- Class: Agaricomycetes
- Order: Boletales
- Family: Boletaceae
- Genus: Tylopilus
- Species: T. veluticeps

Binomial name
- Tylopilus veluticeps (Pat. & C.F.Baker) Singer (1947)

Synonyms
- Boletus veluticeps Pat. & C.F.Baker (1918)

Species of fungus

Tylopilus veluticeps is a bolete fungus in the family Boletaceae found in Singapore. Originally described as a species of Boletus by Narcisse Théophile Patouillard and Charles Fuller Baker in 1918, it was transferred to Tylopilus in 1947 by Rolf Singer. The bolete has a velvety cap measuring 3.5–6.5 cm (1.4–2.6 in) in diameter, and a smooth, stout stipe that is 5–10 cm (2–4 in) long by 4.5–5.5 cm (1.8–2.2 in) thick. The elliptical spores are 12–15 by 4 μm.
