= Tylopilus hongoi =

Scientific classification
- Domain: Eukaryota
- Kingdom: Fungi
- Division: Basidiomycota
- Class: Agaricomycetes
- Order: Boletales
- Family: Boletaceae
- Genus: Tylopilus
- Species: T. hongoi

Binomial name
- Tylopilus hongoi Wolfe & Bougher (1993)

Species of fungus

Tylopilus hongoi is a bolete fungus in the family Boletaceae found in Japan, where it grows in coniferous forest under fir, spruce, and birch. It is named after mycologist Tsuguo Hongo.
