= Tylopilus alkalixanthus =

Scientific classification
- Domain: Eukaryota
- Kingdom: Fungi
- Division: Basidiomycota
- Class: Agaricomycetes
- Order: Boletales
- Family: Boletaceae
- Genus: Tylopilus
- Species: T. alkalixanthus

Binomial name
- Tylopilus alkalixanthus Halling & Amtoft (2002)

Species of fungus

Tylopilus alkalixanthus is a bolete fungus in the family Boletaceae. Found in Costa Rica and Japan, it was described as new to science in 2002 by Anja Amtoft and Roy Halling.
