= Tylopilus acutesquamosus =

Scientific classification
- Domain: Eukaryota
- Kingdom: Fungi
- Division: Basidiomycota
- Class: Agaricomycetes
- Order: Boletales
- Family: Boletaceae
- Genus: Tylopilus
- Species: T. acutesquamosus

Binomial name
- Tylopilus acutesquamosus Singer (1983)

Species of fungus

Tylopilus acutesquamosus is a bolete fungus in the family Boletaceae. It was described as new to science in 1983 from collections made in Amazonas, Brazil, where it was found growing on sandy soil.
