= Tylopilus funerarius =

Scientific classification
- Kingdom: Fungi
- Division: Basidiomycota
- Class: Agaricomycetes
- Order: Boletales
- Family: Boletaceae
- Genus: Tylopilus
- Species: T. funerarius

Binomial name
- Tylopilus funerarius (Massee) Pegler & T.W.K.Young (1981)

Synonyms
- Boletus funerarius Massee (1909)

Species of fungus

Tylopilus funerarius is a bolete fungus in the family Boletaceae. Found in Singapore, it was described as new to science in 1909 by English mycologist George Edward Massee. He described it as a "sombre, uninviting species, characterised by brownish-black velvety pileus and brown tube and pores", and considered it similar in appearance to Boletus chrysenteron (now Xerocomellus chrysenteron). The species was transferred to the genus Tylopilus in 1981.
