= Tylopilus hondurensis =

Scientific classification
- Domain: Eukaryota
- Kingdom: Fungi
- Division: Basidiomycota
- Class: Agaricomycetes
- Order: Boletales
- Family: Boletaceae
- Genus: Tylopilus
- Species: T. hondurensis

Binomial name
- Tylopilus hondurensis Singer & M.H.Ivory (1983)

Species of fungus

Tylopilus hondurensis is a bolete fungus in the family Boletaceae. Found in Honduras, where it grows under Pinus oocarpa, it was described as new to science in 1983.
