= Tylopilus punctatofumosus =

Scientific classification
- Domain: Eukaryota
- Kingdom: Fungi
- Division: Basidiomycota
- Class: Agaricomycetes
- Order: Boletales
- Family: Boletaceae
- Genus: Tylopilus
- Species: T. punctatofumosus

Binomial name
- Tylopilus punctatofumosus (W.F.Chiu) F.L.Tai (1979)

Synonyms
- Boletus punctatofumosus W.F.Chiu (1948)

Species of fungus

Tylopilus punctatofumosus is a bolete fungus in the family Boletaceae found in China. It was described as new to science in 1948 by Wei-Fan Chiu as a species of Boletus; F.L. Tai transferred it to the genus Tylopilus in 1979. The fruit body has a hemispherical to cushion-shaped, white cap measuring 2–3.5 cm (0.8–1.4 in) in diameter. The pores on the cap underside measure less than 1 mm wide. The flesh in the stipe is whitish to yellowish at the base, and does not change color with injury. It has ellipsoid spores measuring 9–11 by 5–6 μm. The type collection was made in Chichushan (Yunnan Province), in September 1938 growing under the conifer species Chinese white pine (Pinus armandii). Related Asian Tylopilus species include T. javanicus and T. roseolus.
