= Tylopilus gomezii =

Scientific classification
- Domain: Eukaryota
- Kingdom: Fungi
- Division: Basidiomycota
- Class: Agaricomycetes
- Order: Boletales
- Family: Boletaceae
- Genus: Tylopilus
- Species: T. gomezii

Binomial name
- Tylopilus gomezii Singer (1991)

Species of fungus

Tylopilus gomezii is a bolete fungus in the family Boletaceae found in Costa Rica, where it grows under oak in montane woodland. It was described as new to science in 1991 by mycologist Rolf Singer.
