= Tylopilus rufonigricans =

Scientific classification
- Domain: Eukaryota
- Kingdom: Fungi
- Division: Basidiomycota
- Class: Agaricomycetes
- Order: Boletales
- Family: Boletaceae
- Genus: Tylopilus
- Species: T. rufonigricans

Binomial name
- Tylopilus rufonigricans T.W.Henkel (1999)

Species of fungus

Tylopilus rufonigricans is a bolete fungus in the family Boletaceae found in the Pakaraima Mountains of Guyana. It was described as new to science in 1999 by mycologist Terry Henkel. Its fruit bodies have convex to flattened caps measuring 4–12 cm (1.6–4.7 in) in diameter; caps can form a central depression in age. The cap surface is covered with black scales, while the surface between the scales is initially greenish yellow, and later dull green and eventually greyish black. The flesh turns reddish when it is cut or injured. Tubes on the cap underside are 5–7.5 mm long, and there are 2–3 pores per mm. The stipe measures 6–10 cm (2.4–3.9 in) long by 10–20 mm thick. The spore print is cinnamon brown; spores are smooth and roughly spindle-shaped (subfusiform) with dimensions of 12–15.2 by 3.6–4.8 μm. T. exiguus fruits singly on root mats on trunks of Dicymbe corymbosa. The specific epithet rufonigricans refers to the reddening reaction of the flesh upon injury.
