= Tylopilus potamogeton =

Scientific classification
- Domain: Eukaryota
- Kingdom: Fungi
- Division: Basidiomycota
- Class: Agaricomycetes
- Order: Boletales
- Family: Boletaceae
- Genus: Tylopilus
- Species: T. potamogeton

Binomial name
- Tylopilus potamogeton Singer (1978)

Species of fungus

Tylopilus potamogeton is a bolete fungus in the family Boletaceae. It was described as new to science in 1978 by mycologist Rolf Singer from collections made near Ponta Negra in Brazil, where it was found growing on sandy soil near dicotyledonous trees.

Fruiting occurs in the rainy season, from December to early March. The characteristic microscopic feature of this species is the unusually wide ellipsoid to somewhat spindle-shaped spores, which measure 9.5–12 by 6.5–8 μm. Singer considered this feature, along with the bitter taste and stipe covering, to warrant creating a new section to contain it, which he named Potamogetones.
