= Tylopilus sultanii =

Scientific classification
- Domain: Eukaryota
- Kingdom: Fungi
- Division: Basidiomycota
- Class: Agaricomycetes
- Order: Boletales
- Family: Boletaceae
- Genus: Tylopilus
- Species: T. sultanii

Binomial name
- Tylopilus sultanii S.Sarwar, Khalid & Niazi (2014)

Species of fungus

Tylopilus sultanii is a bolete fungus found in Pakistan and reported as new to science in 2014. Named after Pakistani mycologist Sultan Ahmad (1910–1983), it is one of three Tylopilus species found in the country; the others are T. pseudoscaber and T. felleus. Tylopilus sultanii resembles T. pseudoscaber, but differs from that species in having a cracked cap surface, no color changes in bruised flesh, and larger spores. Known only from the type locality of Ayubia National Park in Khyber Pakhtunkhwa province, it fruits under conifers from July to September.
