= Tylopilus mitissimus =

Scientific classification
- Domain: Eukaryota
- Kingdom: Fungi
- Division: Basidiomycota
- Class: Agaricomycetes
- Order: Boletales
- Family: Boletaceae
- Genus: Tylopilus
- Species: T. mitissimus

Binomial name
- Tylopilus mitissimus Singer & L.D.Gómez (1991)

Species of fungus

Tylopilus mitissimus is a bolete fungus in the family Boletaceae found in Costa Rica, where it grows under oak in montane woodland. It was described as new to science in 1991.
