= Tylopilus orsonianus =

Scientific classification
- Domain: Eukaryota
- Kingdom: Fungi
- Division: Basidiomycota
- Class: Agaricomycetes
- Order: Boletales
- Family: Boletaceae
- Genus: Tylopilus
- Species: T. orsonianus

Binomial name
- Tylopilus orsonianus Fulgenzi & T.W.Henkel (2007)

Species of fungus

Tylopilus orsonianus is a bolete fungus of the genus Tylopilus. It is found in the Pakaraima Mountains of Guyana, where it fruits singly to scattered on root mats of forests dominated by the tree Dicymbe corymbosa. It was first described scientifically in 2007 by Tara Fulgenzi and Terry Henkel. The species epithet honors American mycologist Orson K. Miller, Jr. Fruit bodies of the fungus have velvety brown convex to flattened caps typically measuring 2.6–6.6 cm (1.0–2.6 in) in diameter. The spore print is flesh pink; the smooth spores are ellipsoid to somewhat fuse-shaped (subfusoid), inamyloid, and have dimensions of 11–14.5 by 4.9–7.4 μm.
