= Tylopilus cyanogranulifer =

Scientific classification
- Domain: Eukaryota
- Kingdom: Fungi
- Division: Basidiomycota
- Class: Agaricomycetes
- Order: Boletales
- Family: Boletaceae
- Genus: Tylopilus
- Species: T. cyanogranulifer

Binomial name
- Tylopilus cyanogranulifer T.H.Li, Watling & N.M.Greg. (1999)

Species of fungus

Tylopilus cyanogranulifer is a bolete fungus found in Queensland, Australia, where it grows in Eucalyptus rain forest.
