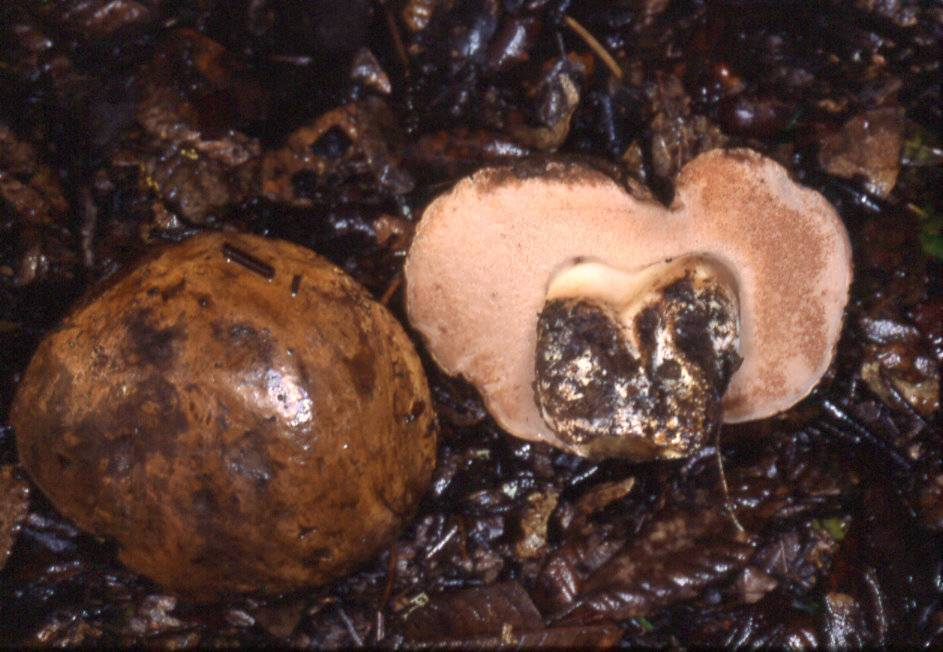

Scientific classification
- Kingdom: Fungi
- Division: Basidiomycota
- Class: Agaricomycetes
- Order: Boletales
- Family: Boletaceae
- Genus: Tylopilus
- Species: T. humilis

Binomial name
- Tylopilus humilis Thiers (1967)

= Tylopilus humilis =

Species of fungus

Tylopilus humilis
- Mycological characteristics
- Pores on hymenium
- Cap is convex or flat
- Stipe is bare
- Spore print is brown
- Ecology is mycorrhizal
- Edibility is unknown

Tylopilus humilis, commonly known as the humble bolete, is a species of bolete fungus in the family Boletaceae. It was first described scientifically in 1967 by Harry Delbert Thiers from collections made in Mendocino, California.

The brown cap is 4–12 centimetres (1 1/2–4 1/2 in) wide. The flesh is white, brusing pinkish, and has a mild taste. The tubes are whitish then become pinkish, staining brown. The stalk is up to 5 cm long, whitish above and brownish below. The spore print is reddish-brown.

The mushroom often remains partially underground until reaching maturity. The species is known only from California, usually in association with manzanita or live oak.

== See also ==
- List of North American boletes
