= Tylopilus brunneirubens =

Scientific classification
- Domain: Eukaryota
- Kingdom: Fungi
- Division: Basidiomycota
- Class: Agaricomycetes
- Order: Boletales
- Family: Boletaceae
- Genus: Tylopilus
- Species: T. brunneirubens

Binomial name
- Tylopilus brunneirubens (Corner) Watling & E.Turnbull (1994)

Synonyms
- Boletus brunneirubens Corner (1972)

Species of fungus

Tylopilus brunneirubens is a bolete fungus of the genus Tylopilus. It was originally described in 1972 by E.J.H. Corner, and transferred to Tylopilus by Roy Watling in 1994. The fungus has been recorded from Malaysia and Zambia, and Singapore.
