= Tylopilus albofarinaceus =

Scientific classification
- Domain: Eukaryota
- Kingdom: Fungi
- Division: Basidiomycota
- Class: Agaricomycetes
- Order: Boletales
- Family: Boletaceae
- Genus: Tylopilus
- Species: T. albofarinaceus

Binomial name
- Tylopilus albofarinaceus (W.F.Chiu) F.L.Tai (1979)

Synonyms
- Boletus albofarinaceus W.F.Chiu (1948)

Species of fungus

Tylopilus albofarinaceus is a bolete fungus in the family Boletaceae found in China. It was first described as new to science in 1948 by Wei-Fan Chiu as a species of Boletus; F.L. Tai transferred it to the genus Tylopilus in 1979. The fruit body has a convex, white cap that is up to 5 cm (2 in) in diameter. The tubes on the cap underside are 3 mm long, while the pores are about 0.7–1 mm wide. The flesh in the stipe is white and does not change color with injury. It has ellipsoid spores measuring 11–14 by 5–7 μm. The type collection was made in Kunming in August 1938.
