= Tylopilus glutinosus =

Scientific classification
- Kingdom: Fungi
- Division: Basidiomycota
- Class: Agaricomycetes
- Order: Boletales
- Family: Boletaceae
- Genus: Tylopilus
- Species: T. glutinosus

Binomial name
- Tylopilus glutinosus Iqbal Hosen (2021)

Species of fungus

Tylopilus glutinosus is a species of the fungal family Boletaceae. It is the first generic report for Bangladesh. This species is putatively associated with Shorea robusta.
