= Tylopilus louisii =

Scientific classification
- Domain: Eukaryota
- Kingdom: Fungi
- Division: Basidiomycota
- Class: Agaricomycetes
- Order: Boletales
- Family: Boletaceae
- Genus: Tylopilus
- Species: T. louisii

Binomial name
- Tylopilus louisii Heinem. (1964)

Species of fungus

Tylopilus louisii is a bolete fungus in the family Boletaceae. Described as new to science in 1964 by Belgian mycologist Paul Heinemann, it is found in the Republic of the Congo. It has a gray cap and stipe, and spores measuring 10–11.7 by 3.5–3.8 μm.

== See also ==
- List of North American boletes
