= Tylopilus montoyae =

Scientific classification
- Domain: Eukaryota
- Kingdom: Fungi
- Division: Basidiomycota
- Class: Agaricomycetes
- Order: Boletales
- Family: Boletaceae
- Genus: Tylopilus
- Species: T. montoyae

Binomial name
- Tylopilus montoyae Singer & J.García (1991)

Species of fungus

Tylopilus montoyae is a bolete fungus in the family Boletaceae found in Veracruz, Mexico, where it grows in mesophilous (moderate temperature) montane forest. It was described as new to science in 1991.

== See also ==
- List of North American boletes
