= Tylopilus temucensis =

Scientific classification
- Domain: Eukaryota
- Kingdom: Fungi
- Division: Basidiomycota
- Class: Agaricomycetes
- Order: Boletales
- Family: Boletaceae
- Genus: Tylopilus
- Species: T. temucensis

Binomial name
- Tylopilus temucensis Palfner (2005)

Species of fungus

Tylopilus temucensis is a bolete fungus in the family Boletaceae. Described as new to science in 2005, it is found in central southern Chile, where it grows on the ground in leaf litter under Nothofagus obliqua. It is the first species of Tylopilus reported from Nothofagus forest in South America. The specific name temucensis refers to Temuco, near the type locality. Fruit bodies have hemispherical to convex brownish caps measuring 3.5–13 cm (1.4–5.1 in) in diameter. The roundish pores on the cap underside are pale yellow, numbering about 1–2 per mm, while the tubes are 6–8 mm long. The fresh spore print is dark pink to purplish gray. Spores are smooth, ellipsoid to fusiform (spindle-shaped), and typically measure 33–43 by 4–8 μm.
