= Tylopilus guanacastensis =

Scientific classification
- Domain: Eukaryota
- Kingdom: Fungi
- Division: Basidiomycota
- Class: Agaricomycetes
- Order: Boletales
- Family: Boletaceae
- Genus: Tylopilus
- Species: T. guanacastensis

Binomial name
- Tylopilus guanacastensis Singer (1983)

Species of fungus

Tylopilus guanacastensis is a bolete fungus in the family Boletaceae. Found in Costa Rica, where it grows under oak, it was described as new to science in 1983 by mycologist Rolf Singer.
