= Tylopilus exiguus =

Scientific classification
- Domain: Eukaryota
- Kingdom: Fungi
- Division: Basidiomycota
- Class: Agaricomycetes
- Order: Boletales
- Family: Boletaceae
- Genus: Tylopilus
- Species: T. exiguus

Binomial name
- Tylopilus exiguus T.W.Henkel (1999)

Species of fungus

Tylopilus exiguus is a small bolete fungus in the family Boletaceae found in the Pakaraima Mountains of Guyana. It was described as new to science in 1999 by mycologist Terry Henkel. Its fruit bodies have dark olive-green caps measuring 1–3 cm (0.4–1.2 in) in diameter. The tubes on the cap underside are 1–3 mm long, and there are 1–1.5 angular pores per mm. The stipe measures 1–3 cm (0.4–1.2 in) long by 2–4 mm thick. The spore print is dark reddish brown; spores are roughly spindle-shaped (subfusoid) with dimensions of 10–13 by 4–5 μm. T. exiguus fruits singly or in small groups on humus and moss mats on trunks of Dicymbe corymbosa. The specific epithet exiguus is Latin for "small".
