= Tylopilus cyanescens =

Scientific classification
- Domain: Eukaryota
- Kingdom: Fungi
- Division: Basidiomycota
- Class: Agaricomycetes
- Order: Boletales
- Family: Boletaceae
- Genus: Tylopilus
- Species: T. cyanescens

Binomial name
- Tylopilus cyanescens T.H.Li & Watling (1999)

Species of fungus

Tylopilus cyanescens is a bolete fungus found in New South Wales, Australia, where it grows on sandy soils in eucalypt forest. It was described as new to science in 1999 by mycologists Roy Watling and Tai-Hui Li.
