= Tylopilus corneri =

Scientific classification
- Domain: Eukaryota
- Kingdom: Fungi
- Division: Basidiomycota
- Class: Agaricomycetes
- Order: Boletales
- Family: Boletaceae
- Genus: Tylopilus
- Species: T. corneri

Binomial name
- Tylopilus corneri Singer, J.García & L.D.Gómez (1991)

Species of fungus

Tylopilus corneri is a bolete fungus in the family Boletaceae found in Costa Rica, where it grows under oak in montane forest. Described as new to science in 1991, it is named after English mycologist E.J.H. Corner.
