= Tylopilus montanus =

Scientific classification
- Domain: Eukaryota
- Kingdom: Fungi
- Division: Basidiomycota
- Class: Agaricomycetes
- Order: Boletales
- Family: Boletaceae
- Genus: Tylopilus
- Species: T. montanus

Binomial name
- Tylopilus montanus Singer (1989)

Species of fungus

Tylopilus montanus is a bolete fungus in the family Boletaceae. It is found in Costa Rica, where it grows on the ground in tropical montane forests under Quercus and Magnolia.
