= Tylopilus zambianus =

Scientific classification
- Domain: Eukaryota
- Kingdom: Fungi
- Division: Basidiomycota
- Class: Agaricomycetes
- Order: Boletales
- Family: Boletaceae
- Genus: Tylopilus
- Species: T. zambianus

Binomial name
- Tylopilus zambianus Watling (1994)

Species of fungus

Tylopilus zambianus is a bolete fungus of the genus Tylopilus. Described as new to science in 1994 by Scottish mycologist Roy Watling, it is found in Zambia, where it grows on the ground in relic miombo woodland.
