= Tylopilus oradivensis =

Scientific classification
- Domain: Eukaryota
- Kingdom: Fungi
- Division: Basidiomycota
- Class: Agaricomycetes
- Order: Boletales
- Family: Boletaceae
- Genus: Tylopilus
- Species: T. oradivensis

Binomial name
- Tylopilus oradivensis Osmundson & Halling (2010)

Species of fungus

Tylopilus oradivensis is a bolete fungus in the family Boletaceae. Found in the Talamanca Mountains of Costa Rica, it was described as new to science in 2010 by mycologists Todd Osmundson and Roy Halling. The bolete fruits scattered or in groups under oak trees, at elevations ranging between 1,600 and 1,850 m (5,250 and 6,070 ft). The specific epithet combines the words ora ("coast"), dives ("rich"), and the suffix ensis ("from a place") to refer to the type locality.

== Description ==
Fruit bodies have convex to flattened caps measuring 3–6 cm (1.2–2.4 in) in diameter. The cap surface is tomentose with an inrolled margin, and ranges in color from brown to orange to red. Flesh is white to cream colored, and does not change color with injury. The tubes on the cap underside are up to 6 mm deep; the pores stain light brown with injury. The stipe measures 5–7 cm (2.0–2.8 in) long by 0.8–1 cm (0.3–0.4 in) thick, and is roughly the same color as the cap or paler. The fusiform (spindle-shaped), thin-walled spores typically measure 8.2–12 by 3–4 μm, and contain a single oil droplet. T. oradivensis fruit bodies are similar in morphology to the eastern North American bolete Tylopilus balloui.
