= Tylopilus brachypus =

Scientific classification
- Domain: Eukaryota
- Kingdom: Fungi
- Division: Basidiomycota
- Class: Agaricomycetes
- Order: Boletales
- Family: Boletaceae
- Genus: Tylopilus
- Species: T. brachypus

Binomial name
- Tylopilus brachypus Singer, J.García & L.D.Gómez (1991)

Species of fungus

Tylopilus brachypus is a bolete fungus in the family Boletaceae found in Durango, Mexico, where it grows under pine and oak in montane forests. It was described as new to science in 1991.

== See also ==
- List of North American boletes
