= Tylopilus subvinaceipallidus =

Scientific classification
- Domain: Eukaryota
- Kingdom: Fungi
- Division: Basidiomycota
- Class: Agaricomycetes
- Order: Boletales
- Family: Boletaceae
- Genus: Tylopilus
- Species: T. subvinaceipallidus

Binomial name
- Tylopilus subvinaceipallidus T.H.Li & Watling 1999 (1999)

Species of fungus

Tylopilus subvinaceipallidus is a bolete fungus found in New South Wales, Australia.
