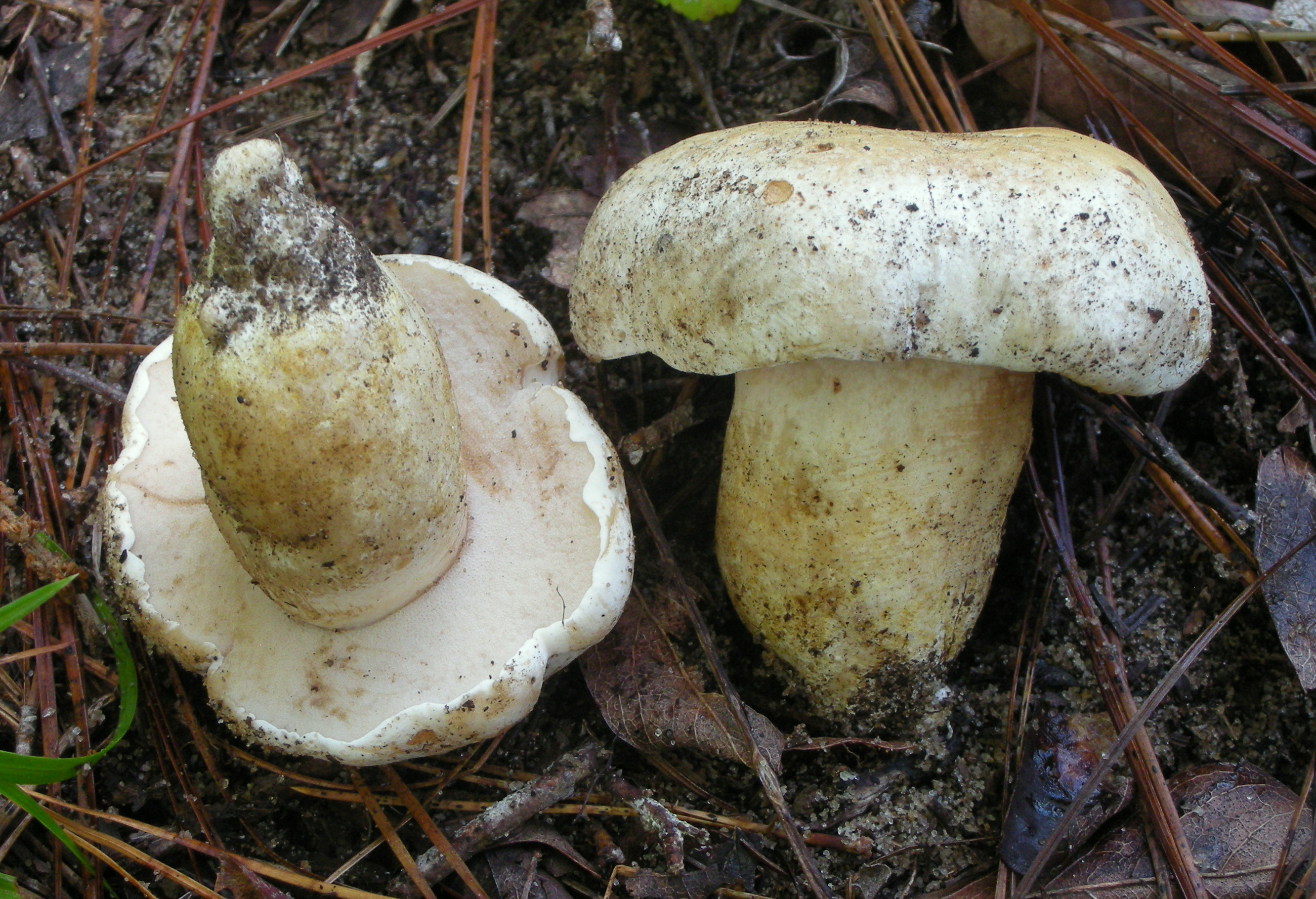

Scientific classification
- Domain: Eukaryota
- Kingdom: Fungi
- Division: Basidiomycota
- Class: Agaricomycetes
- Order: Boletales
- Family: Boletaceae
- Genus: Tylopilus
- Species: T. peralbidus

Binomial name
- Tylopilus peralbidus (Snell & Beardslee) Murrill (1938)

Synonyms
- Boletus peralbidus Snell & Beardslee (1936)

= Tylopilus peralbidus =

Species of fungus

Tylopilus peralbidus is a bolete fungus in the family Boletaceae native to the eastern United States.

== Taxonomy ==
The species was first described in 1936 by Wally Snell and Henry Curtis Beardslee as a species of Boletus. William Alphonso Murrill transferred it to Tylopilus in 1938. Rolf Singer described a variety Tylopilus peralbidus var. rhodoconius in 1945, but this was renamed as an independent species, Tylopilus rhodoconius, in 1998.

== Description ==
The fruit bodies have caps that are initially convex before flattening out in maturity (sometimes developing a central depression); they reach a diameter of 4.5–13 cm (1.8–5.1 in). The cap surface is dry, smooth to slightly hairy, while the color ranges from white initially to tan to brownish in maturity. Brownish stains develop where the cap has been bruised. On the cap underside, the pores are initially whitish, but turn buff to pinkish as the spores mature. The pores are circular to angular, numbering 1 to 3 per millimetre, and the tubes are 6–10 mm (0.2–0.4 in) deep. The stipe measures 4.5–11 cm (1.8–4.3 in) long by 1.3–4 cm (0.51–1.57 in) thick, and is either more or less equal in width throughout, or tapers slightly at either end. Its color is whitish to brownish.

The spore print is cream-buff. Spores are smooth, cylindrical to somewhat club-shaped, and measure 7–12 by 2.3–3.5 μm. The flesh quickly stains dark grey to violet grey when a drop of iron(II) sulfate (FeSO_{4}) solution is applied; potassium hydroxide (KOH) solution turns the flesh yellow to yellow-ochre.

== Habitat and distribution ==
Fruit bodies of Tylopilus peralbidus grow singly to scattered on the ground under oaks, or occasionally with pine. Preferred habitats include shaded lawns and along roads. Found in the eastern United States, the bolete has been recorded from North Carolina south to Florida, west to Texas. It fruits from May to October.

== See also ==
- List of North American boletes
