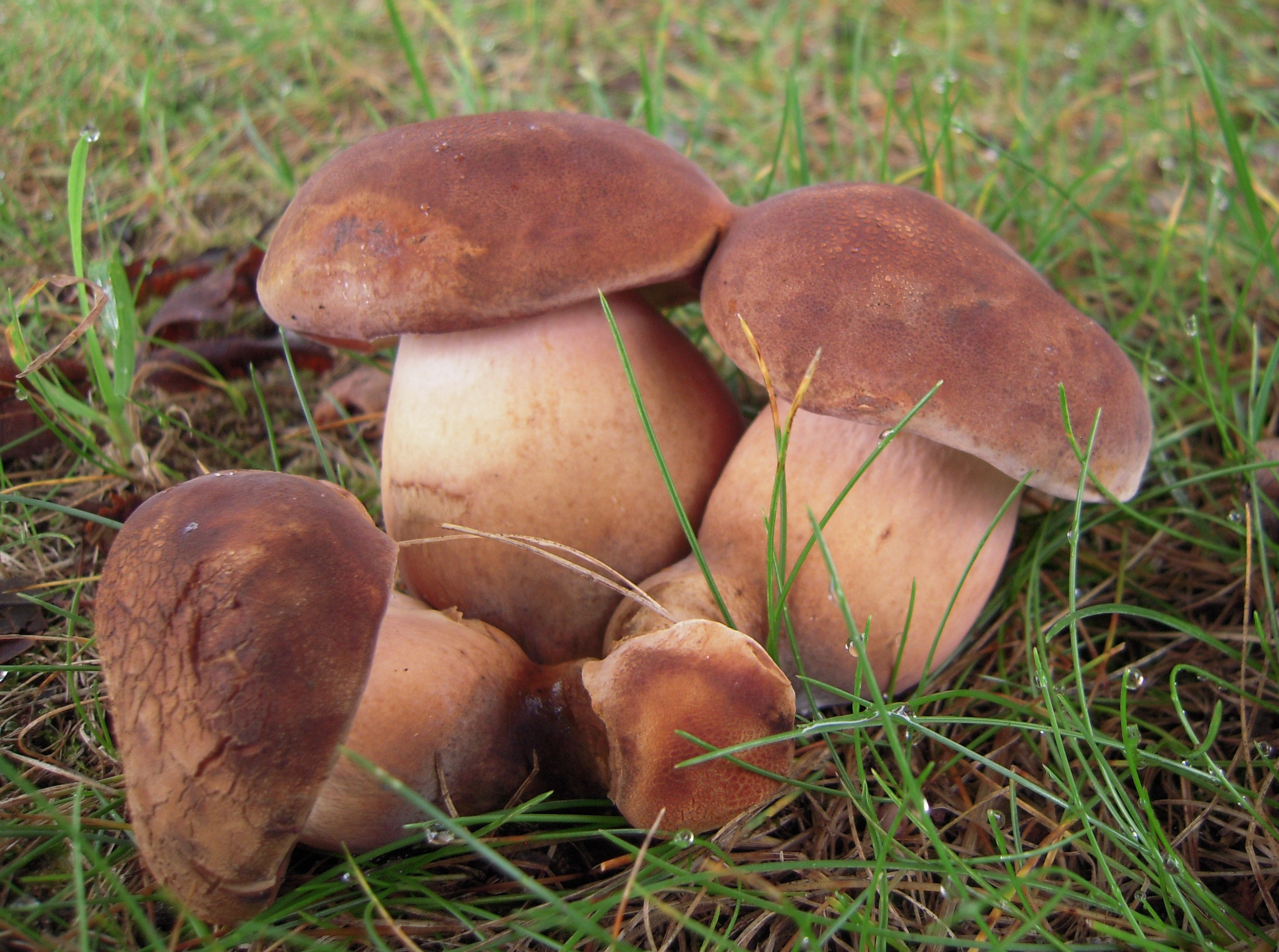

Scientific classification
- Domain: Eukaryota
- Kingdom: Fungi
- Division: Basidiomycota
- Class: Agaricomycetes
- Order: Boletales
- Family: Boletaceae
- Genus: Tylopilus
- Species: T. ferrugineus

Binomial name
- Tylopilus ferrugineus (Frost) Singer (1947)

Synonyms
- Boletus ferrugineus Frost (1874)

= Tylopilus ferrugineus =

Species of fungus

Tylopilus ferrugineus is a bolete fungus in the family Boletaceae, native to North America. It was originally described by Charles Christopher Frost in 1874 as Boletus ferrugineus and was transferred to the genus Tylopilus by Rolf Singer in 1947.

== See also ==
- List of North American boletes
