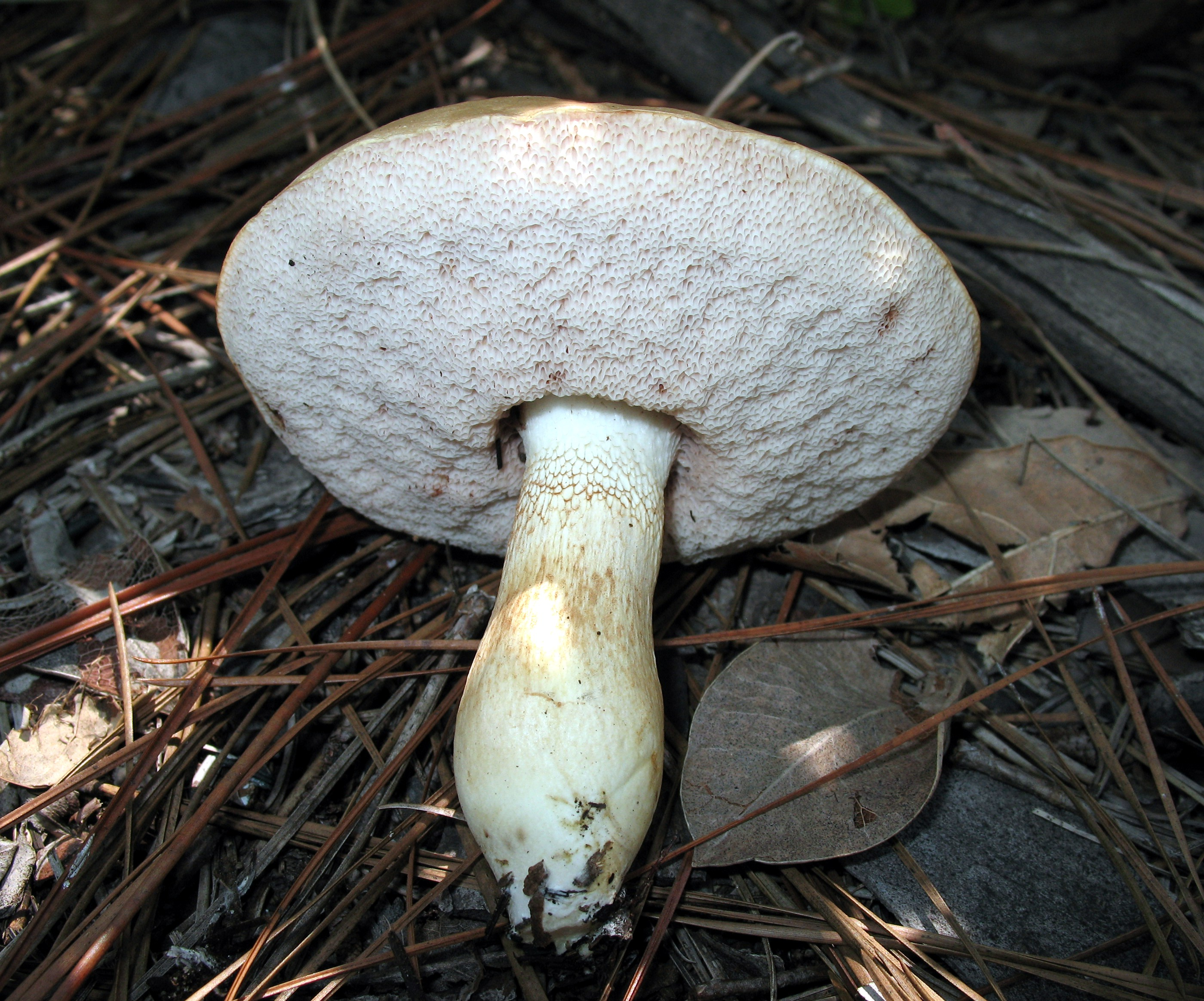

Scientific classification
- Kingdom: Fungi
- Division: Basidiomycota
- Class: Agaricomycetes
- Order: Boletales
- Family: Boletaceae
- Genus: Tylopilus
- Species: T. rhoadsiae

Binomial name
- Tylopilus rhoadsiae (Murrill) Murrill (1944)

Synonyms
- Gyroporus rhoadsiae Murrill (1940); Boletus rhoadsiae (Murrill) Murrill (1940); Leucogyroporus rhoadsiae (Murrill) Snell (1942)

= Tylopilus rhoadsiae =

Species of fungus

Tylopilus rhoadsiae, commonly known as the pale bitter bolete, is a bolete fungus in the family Boletaceae native to the eastern United States.

== Taxonomy ==
The species was described in 1940 as Gyroporus badiceps by William Alphonso Murrill, and later transferred to the genus Tylopilus by Murrill in 1944. In 1942, Wally Snell moved the species to Leucogyroporus, a genus he created to contain several species from Florida originally placed by Singer in Gyroporus; Leucogyroporus has since been subsumed into Tylopilus.

The mushroom is commonly known as the "pale bitter bolete".

== Description ==
Fruit bodies have caps that are convex to flattened, measuring 6–9 cm (2.4–3.5 in) in diameter. They are dry, smooth to slightly hairy, and sometimes shiny. Its color is whitish, sometimes with buff, greyish buff, or pinkish shades mixed in. The flesh is white, lacks any distinct odor, and has a bitter taste that renders the mushroom inedible. The flesh does not discolor when it is cut or otherwise injured. On the cap underside, the pore surface are initially white, but turn pale pink as the spores mature. The pores are irregularly shaped, and number about one or two per millimetre, while the tubes are 0.9–1.6 cm (0.4–0.6 in). The stipe measures 5–10 cm (2.0–3.9 in) long by 1.6–2.8 cm (0.6–1.1 in) thick, and is roughly equal in width throughout its length, although it can have a pinched base. Its surface is dry, its color whitish (or similar to the cap color), and it has distinct reticulations (a mesh-like pattern) on its upper half.

The spore print is pinkish to brown-violaceus. Spores are smooth, oblong to elliptical, hyaline (translucent) to pale yellow, and measure 11–13.5 by 3.5–4.5 μm. A drop of dilute potassium hydroxide (KOH) or ammonium hydroxide (NH_{4}OH) solution will turn the cap cuticle yellow.

=== Similar species ===
The widely distributed bolete Tylopilus felleus is similar in appearance to T. rhoadsiae, but has a very bitter taste, and a darker cap. Tylopilus rhodoconius has a cap that is initially brownish-orange before turning dark brown in age, and a white pore surface that stains brown when bruised.

== Habitat and distribution ==
Fruit bodies of Tylopilus rhoadsiae grow scattered or in groups on the ground under pine and oak trees. Sandy soil is a preferred substrate. Fruiting occurs from July to October. The bolete is found in the eastern United States in a range extending from New Hampshire south to Florida, and west to Texas. It is common along the Gulf Coast and the coastal plains of North Carolina.

== See also ==
- List of North American boletes
