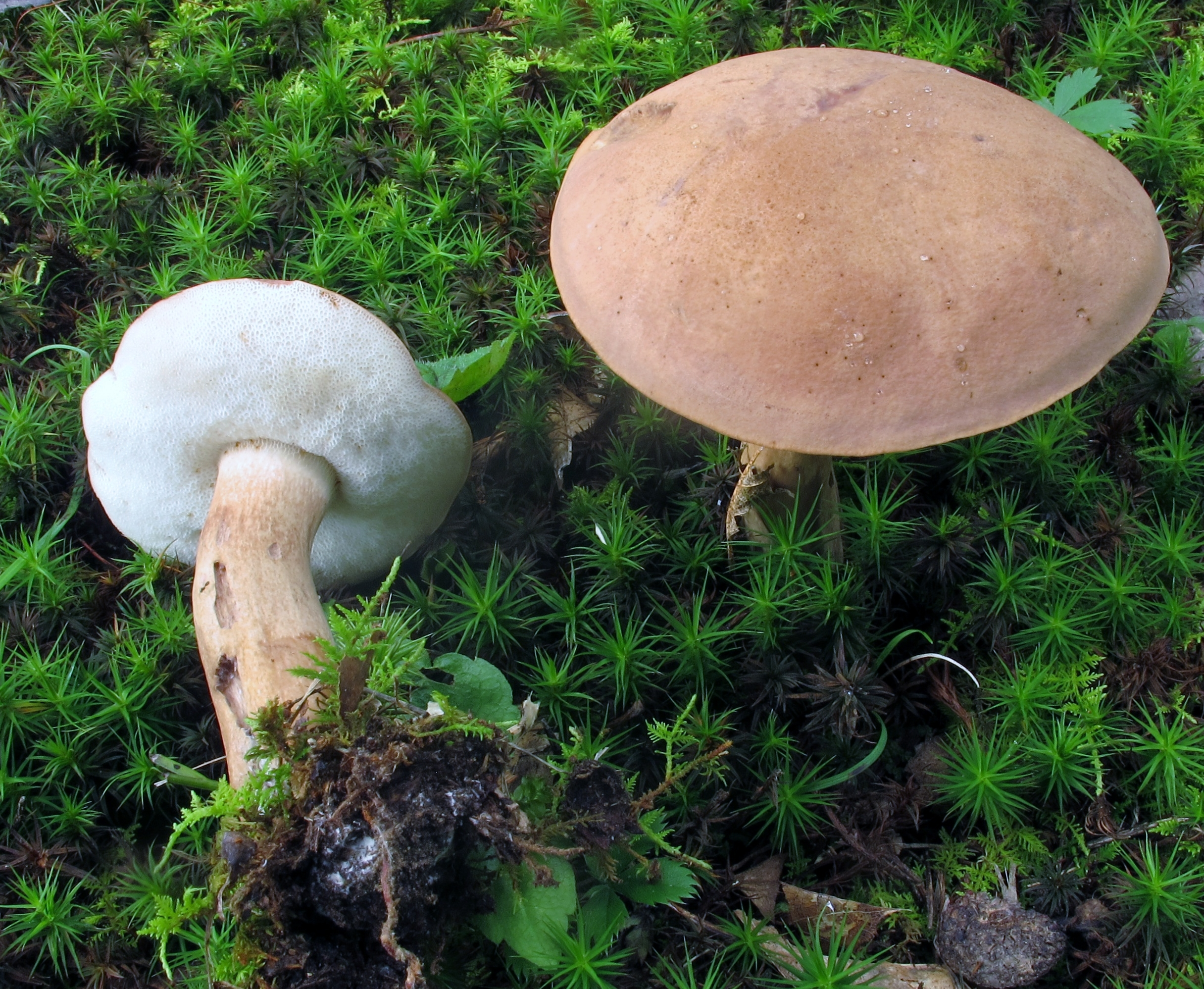

Scientific classification
- Kingdom: Fungi
- Division: Basidiomycota
- Class: Agaricomycetes
- Order: Boletales
- Family: Boletaceae
- Genus: Porphyrellus
- Species: P. indecisus

Binomial name
- Porphyrellus indecisus (Peck) E.-J. Gilbert

Synonyms
- List: Boletus indecisus Peck (1888); Tylopilus indecisus (Peck) Murrill (1909); Boletus subpunctipes Peck; Tylopilus subpunctipes (Peck) A.H. Sm. & Thiers

= Porphyrellus indecisus =

Species of fungus

Porphyrellus indecisus
- Mycological characteristics
- Pores on hymenium
- Cap is convex or flat
- Stipe is bare
- Spore print is tan to reddish-brown
- Ecology is mycorrhizal
- Edibility is edible

Porphyrellus indecisus, commonly known as the indecisive bolete, is a species of bolete fungus in the family Boletaceae. It was described in 1888 by Charles Horton Peck. It is native to North America and edible.

== Taxonomy ==
This species was first described by Charles Horton Peck in 1888 as Boletus indecisus. In 1909, William Murrill used the name Tylopilus indecisus to refer to this species. The current name was first used by Édouard-Jean Gilbert in 1931.

== Description ==
The fruiting bodies have convex to flat brown caps 5–25 centimetres (2–10 in) in diameter. The surface of the cap is often smooth and dry. The pores are small at first, but get larger as the mushroom ages. The stipe is sometimes, but not always, thicker at the base. The spore print is pinkish-tan to reddish-brown, sometimes with a vinaceous tinge.

== Edibility ==
Porphyrellus indecisus is edible.

== See also ==
- List of North American boletes
