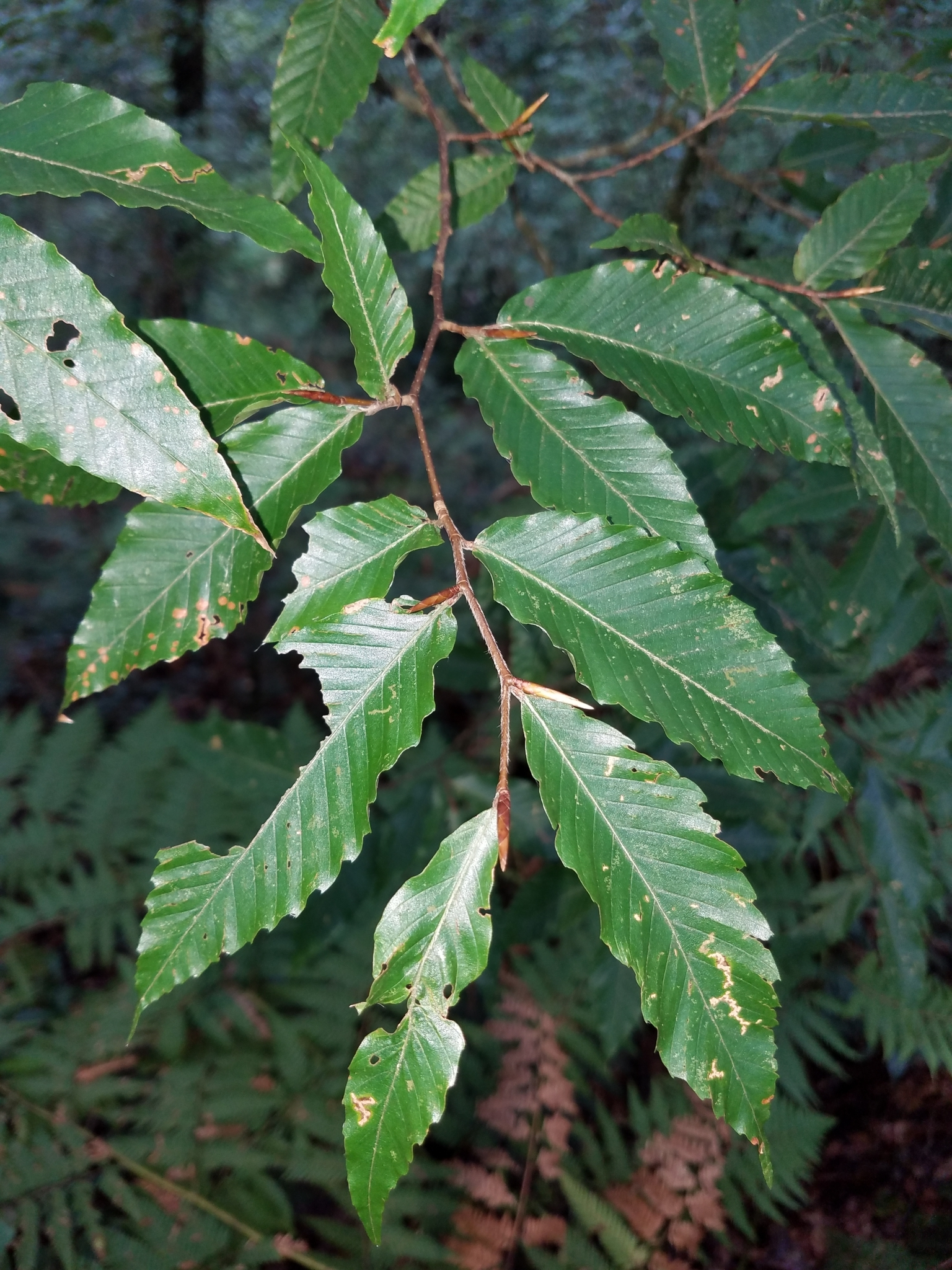
- Fagus mexicana foliage

Scientific classification
- Kingdom: Plantae
- Clade: Tracheophytes
- Clade: Angiosperms
- Clade: Eudicots
- Clade: Rosids
- Order: Fagales
- Family: Fagaceae
- Genus: Fagus
- Species: F. mexicana

Binomial name
- Fagus mexicana Martínez
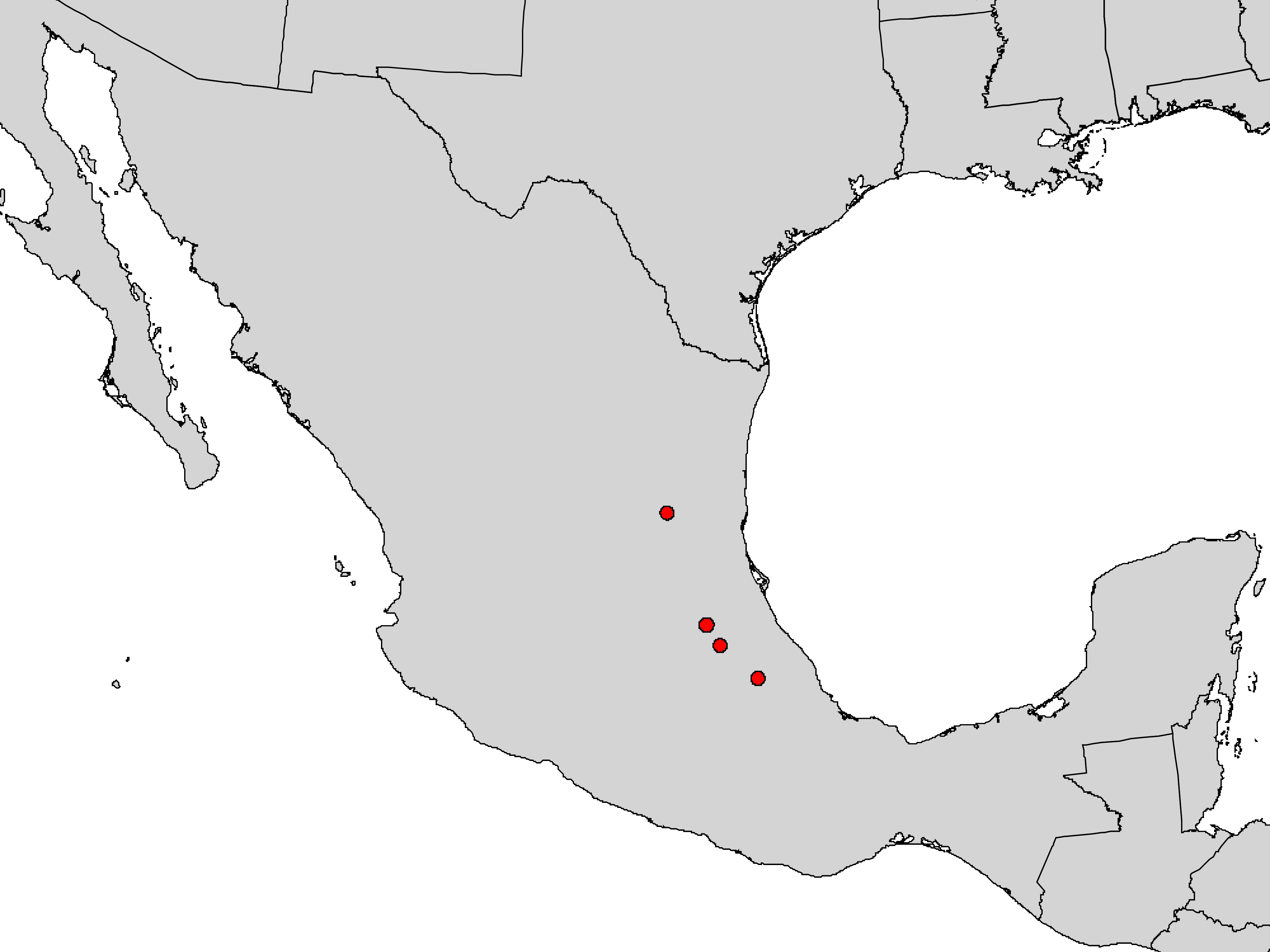
- Natural range of Fagus mexicana in red

= Fagus mexicana =

Species of beech

Fagus mexicana, the Mexican beech or haya, is a species of beech endemic to northeastern and central Mexico, where it occurs from Nuevo León, Tamaulipas south to Hidalgo, Veracruz and Puebla. It is restricted to Tropical montane cloud forests in the Sierra Madre Oriental.

It is closely related to the American beech Fagus grandifolia and until recently was frequently treated as a subspecies of it, as Fagus grandifolia subsp. mexicana (Martínez) E.Murray. However, recent research has shown it differs in genetics, lacking some ancient introgression with Eurasian Fagus species which is present in F. grandifolia, as well as in morphology with slenderer leaves and its habitat differences; it is now accepted as a separate species by the Plants of the World Online database.

== Description ==
Fagus mexicana is a deciduous tree, reaching heights of 25–40 m tall and up to 1 m trunk diameter. The leaves are alternate and simple, with a slightly toothed margin, usually smaller than those of American beech, 5–8 cm long and 3–5 cm broad. The buds are long and slender, 15–25 mm long and 2–3 mm thick.

The flowers are small catkins which appear shortly after the leaves in spring. The seeds are small triangular nuts 15–20 mm long and 7–10 mm wide at the base; there are two nuts in each cupule, maturing in the autumn 6–7 months after pollination.
