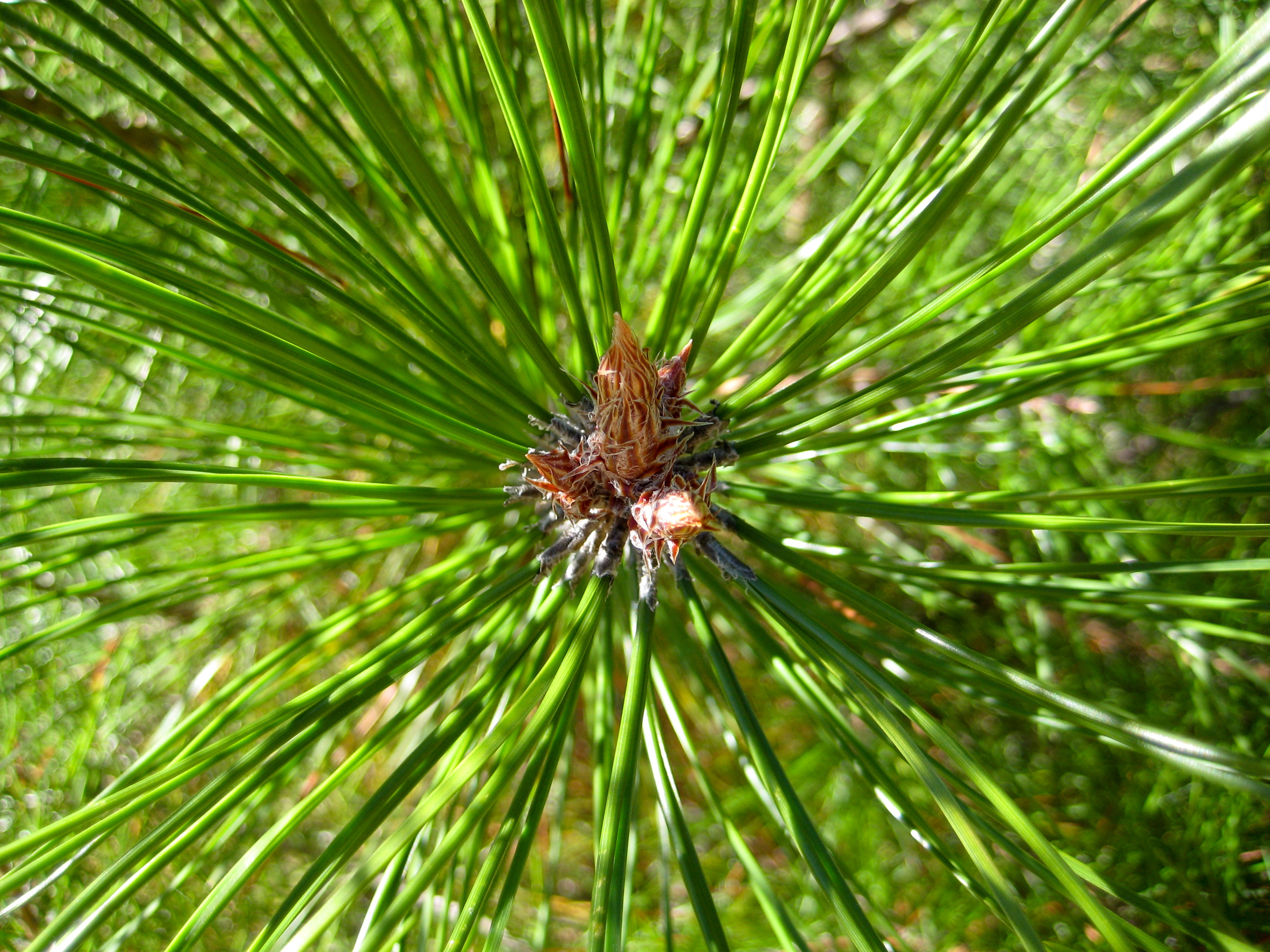

Conservation status
- Least Concern (IUCN 3.1)

Scientific classification
- Kingdom: Plantae
- Clade: Tracheophytes
- Clade: Gymnosperms
- Division: Pinophyta
- Class: Pinopsida
- Order: Pinales
- Family: Pinaceae
- Genus: Pinus
- Subgenus: P. subg. Pinus
- Section: P. sect. Pinus
- Subsection: P. subsect. Pinus
- Species: P. densata

Binomial name
- Pinus densata Mast.

Synonyms
- Homotypic Synonyms: Pinus sinensis var. densata (Mast.) Shaw; Pinus tabuliformis var. densata (Mast.) Rehder; Heterotypic Synonyms: Pinus densata subsp. tibetica Businský; Pinus prominens Mast.

= Pinus densata =

Species of conifer

Pinus densata, the Sikang pine, is a species of conifer in the family Pinaceae. It is native to China.
