= Tsuguo Hongo =

Japanese mycologist

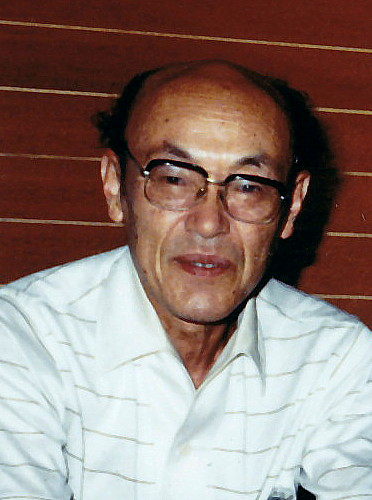
Tsuguo Hongo in 1989

Tsuguo Hongo (本郷 次雄, Hongō Tsuguo; November 1, 1923 – April 2, 2007) was a Japanese mycologist who specialized in the biogeography and taxonomy of Agaricales. Hongo entered the Department of Biology at what is now Hiroshima University in 1943, where he studied botany until graduating in 1946 with a B.Sc. Hongo received his Ph.D. degree, entitled "Agaricales of Japan", from Kyoto University in 1961 while working under Dr. Shiro Kitamura.

He was president of the Mycological Society of Japan from 1987 to 1989. In 2003 he was awarded the Minakata Kumagusu Award for contributions to mycology. Hongo published more than 130 scientific papers and 9 books. He also described 215 new taxa of Agaricales from a variety of locations. Fungus species named after Hongo include: Amanita hongoi, Boletus hongoi, Xerula hongoi, Pluteus hongoi, Russula hongoi, Strobilomyces hongoi, and Tylopilus hongoi.

Hongo may be considered a case of cross-lingual nominative determinism, as the word hongo means "mushroom" or "fungus" in Spanish.

== See also ==
- List of mycologists

== Selected publications ==
- Imazeki R, Hongo T. (1957). Genshoku Nihon Kinrui Zukan [Colored Illustrations of Fungi of Japan]. Vol. 1, 181 pp. Japan, Osaka; Hoikusha Publishing Co., Ltd.
- Imazeki R, Hongo T. (1965). Genshoku Nihon Kinrui Zukan [Colored Illustrations of Fungi of Japan]. Vol. 2, 224 pp. Japan, Osaka; Hoikusha Publishing Co., Ltd.
- Imazeki R, Hongo T. (1987). Genshoku Nihon Shin Kinrui Zukan [New Colored Illustrations of Mushrooms of Japan], Vol. 1. 315 pp. Osaka, Japan; Hoikusha Publishing Co., Ltd.
- Imazeki R, Otani Y, Hongo, T. (1988). Nihon no Kinoko [Fungi of Japan], 623 pp. Tokyo, Japan; Yama-Kei Publishers Co., Ltd.
- Imazeki R, Hongo T. (1989). Genshoku Nihon Shin Kinrui Zukan [New Colored Illustrations of Mushrooms of Japan], Vol. 2. 316 pp. Osaka, Japan; Hoikusha Publishing Co., Ltd.
- Hongo T. (1989). Selected Mycological Papers of Dr. Tsuguo Hongo [Reprinted by Shiga University, Faculty of Education, Laboratory of Biology]. 362 pp. Otsu, Japan; Shiga University.
- Hongo T, Ueda T, Izawa M. (1994). [Mushrooms]. 384 pp. Tokyo; Yama-kei Publishers Co., Ltd.
