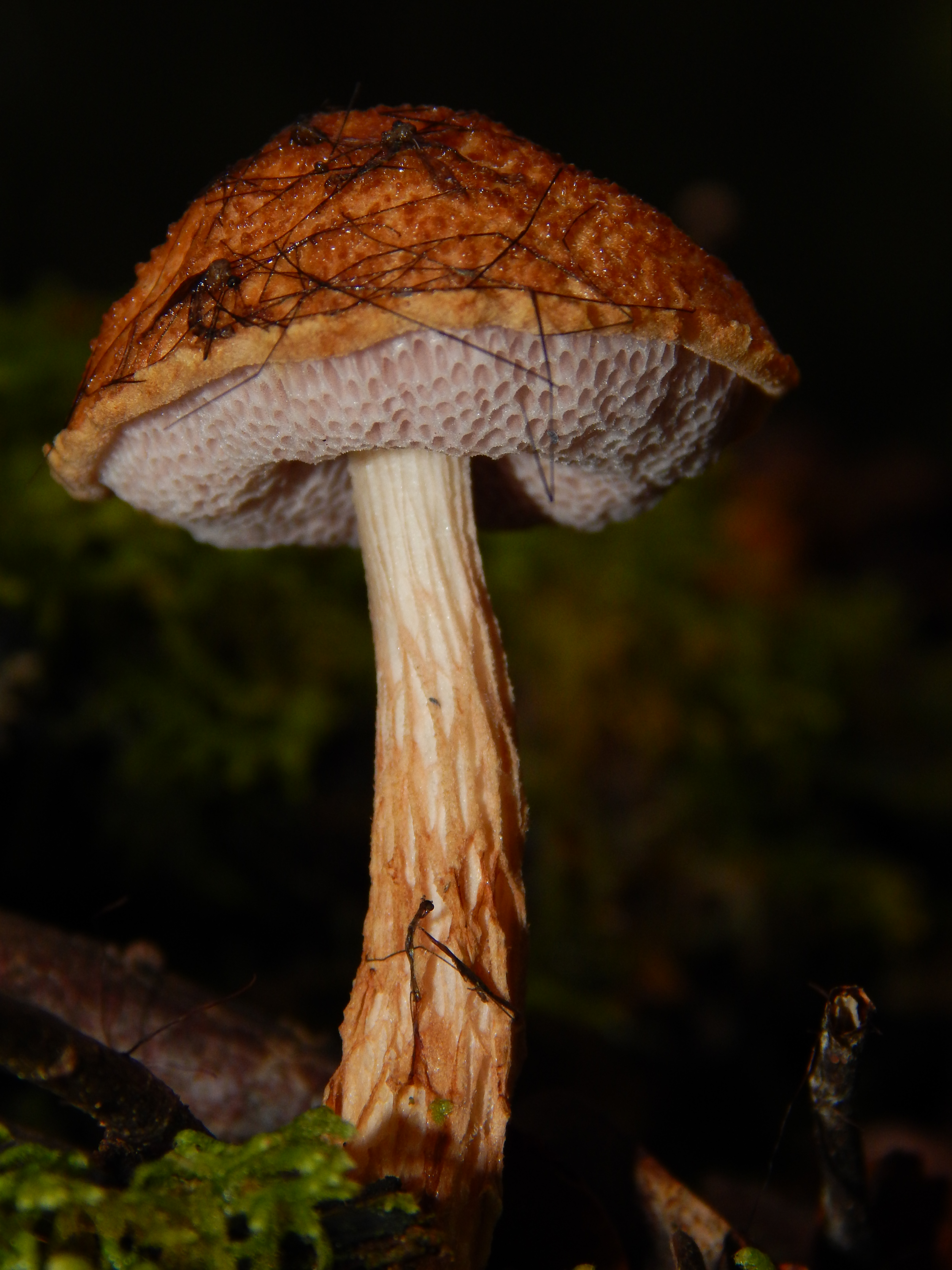
- Austroboletus asper growing in Hellyer Gorge, Tasmania, Australia

Scientific classification
- Domain: Eukaryota
- Kingdom: Fungi
- Division: Basidiomycota
- Class: Agaricomycetes
- Order: Boletales
- Family: Boletaceae
- Genus: Austroboletus
- Species: A. asper

Binomial name
- Austroboletus asper K.Syme, Bonito, T.Lebel, Fechner & Halling (2020)

= Austroboletus asper =

Species of fungus

Austroboletus asper is a species of bolete fungus found in Australia. It was described only recently identified in 2020 by the mycologists Roy Halling, Katrina Syme, Gregory Bonito, Teresa Lebel, and Nigel Fechner. The species name is derived from the Latin word asper meaning 'rough'. Austroboletus asper is an interesting mushroom-forming fungus species found amidst the eucalyptus forests of southeastern Australia and Tasmania. It features including a dry cap and a stem adorned with subtle reticulations. This species has a cap with a pale appendiculate margin, whose spores are Q ≥ 3.

According to the state of Queensland, Australia, it has no conservation significance as of 20 May 2024, which means that its existence is not at threat.

== External sources ==
- Mysterious Mushroom: Austroboletus asper Revealed - Garigal Country, Youtube by Mary Bell, 26 March 2024
