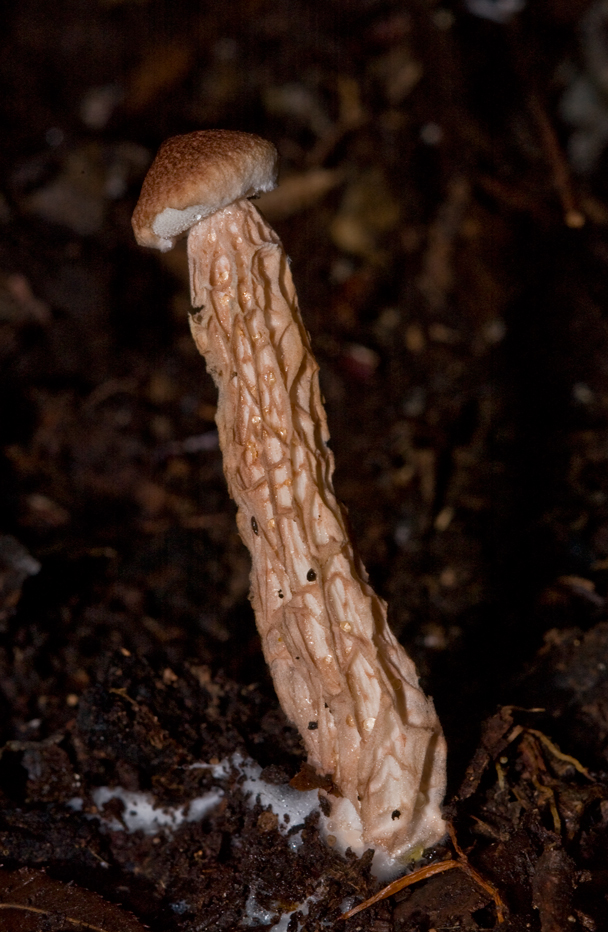
- In New South Wales, Australia

Scientific classification
- Domain: Eukaryota
- Kingdom: Fungi
- Division: Basidiomycota
- Class: Agaricomycetes
- Order: Boletales
- Family: Boletaceae
- Genus: Austroboletus
- Species: A. lacunosus

Binomial name
- Austroboletus lacunosus (Kuntze) T.W.May & A.E.Wood (1995)

Synonyms
- Boletus lacunosus Cooke & Massee (1889); Suillus lacunosus Kuntze (1898); Boletus novae-zelandiae McNabb (1968); Austroboletus novae-zelandiae (McNabb) Wolfe [as 'novaezelandiae'] (1980)

= Austroboletus lacunosus =

Species of fungus

Austroboletus lacunosus is a bolete fungus native to Australia.

== Taxonomy ==
The species was originally described as Boletus lacunosus by Mordecai Cubitt Cooke and George Edward Massee in 1889. However, this name was not valid, as it had been used previously. Suillus lacunosus was proposed by Otto Kuntze in 1898 as a new name for the species, and because of its earlier publication date, takes precedence over the superfluous name Boletus cookei proposed by Pier Andrea Saccardo and Hans Sydow in 1899. The taxon was transferred to the genus Austroboletus by Australian mycologists Tom May & Alec Wood in 1995.

The sympatric species Austroboletus mutabilis is distinguished by the unique colour shift on the cap from deep red to orange and then yellow.
