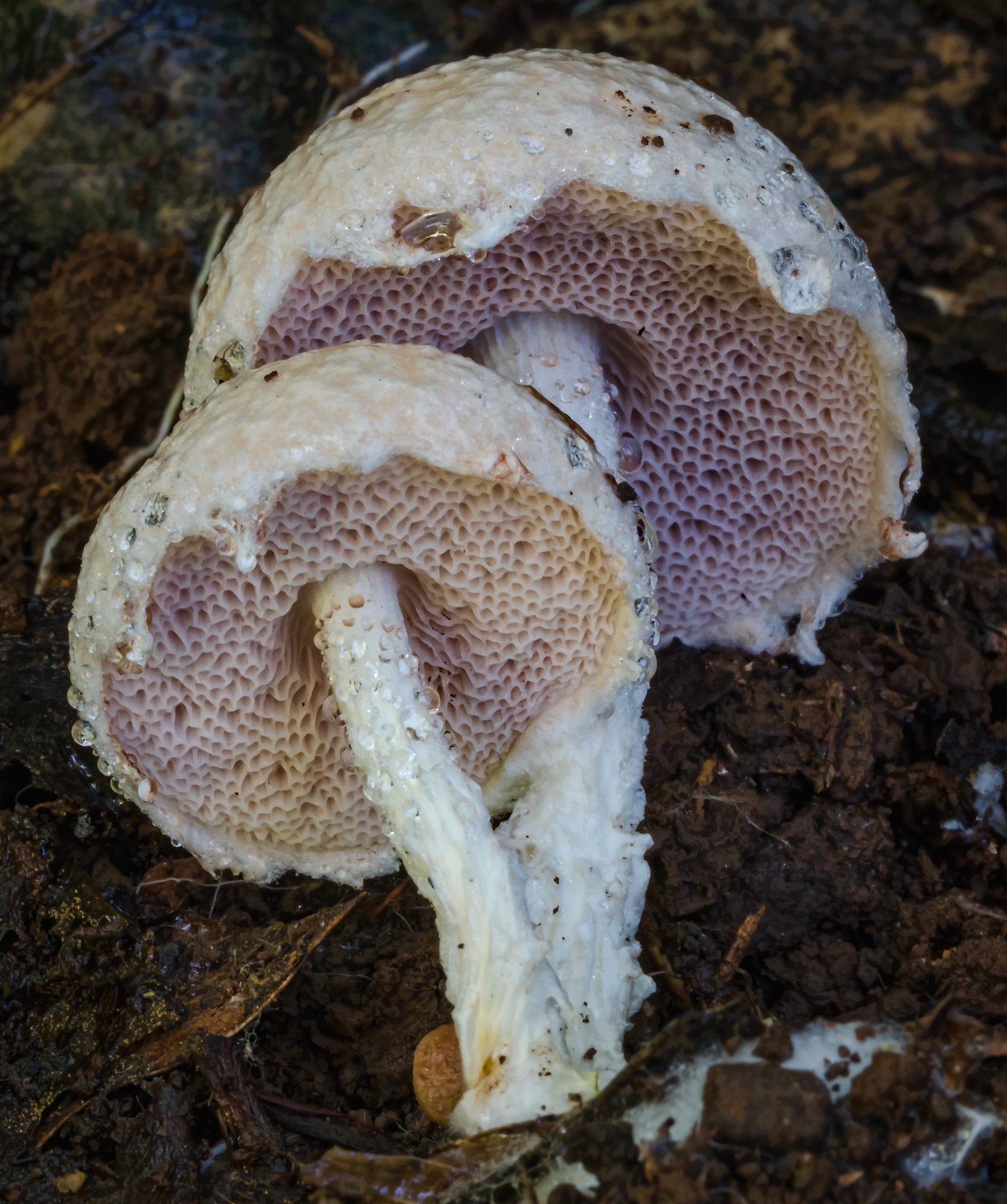
- Austroboletus eburneus

Scientific classification
- Kingdom: Fungi
- Division: Basidiomycota
- Class: Agaricomycetes
- Order: Boletales
- Family: Boletaceae
- Genus: Austroboletus (Corner) Wolfe (1980)

Type species
- Austroboletus dictyotus (Boedijn) Wolfe (1980)

Synonyms
- Boletus subgen. Austroboletus Corner (1972)

= Austroboletus =

Genus of fungi

Austroboletus is a genus of fungi in the family Boletaceae. The widely distributed genus contains species that form mycorrhizal relationships with plants.

== Taxonomy ==
E. J. H. Corner originally defined Austroboletus as a subgenus of Boletus in his 1972 work Boletus in Malaysia, before it was raised to genus level in 1979 by mycologist Carl B. Wolfe. The type species is Austroboletus dictyotus, a fungus originally described by Karel Bernard Boedijn in 1960 as a member of the genus Porphyrellus. The generic name Austroboletus means "southern bolete".

In a 2014 molecular genetics study, Wu and colleagues defined 22 clades within the Boletaceae. They found the genus as understood to be polyphyletic – composed of two distinct lineages. One with pitted stipes, which remained as Austroboletus, while those with smoother stipes were moved to Veloporphyrellus. They delineated a subfamily Austroboletoideae, which contained genera with pitted spores, including Austroboletus, Fistulinella, Mucilopilus and Veloporphyrellus. These genera were notable in the family in that their fruit bodies generally do not change colour when bruised.

== Description ==
Although they resemble other boletes macroscopically, Austroboletus is differentiated microscopically with spores that are pitted, rather than smooth. The spore colour ranges from lilac- or pinkish-brown to wine-coloured. The pores and tubes are whitish. Members of the genus have a distinctive stipe marked by a coarse reticulate or lacunar (pitted) pattern—most prominent in species native to the western Pacific. The caps are usually dry when young, and sometimes sticky in maturity, with a surface texture ranging from smooth to tomentose to scaly. Microscopically, Austroboletus lacks clamp connections in the hyphae, and the presence of pleurocystidia and cheilocystidia (cystidia on the pore face and edge, respectively) is variable.

== Habitat, distribution, and ecology ==
Members of the genus are found mainly in the tropics, as well as Australia, New Zealand, and New Caledonia in the southern hemisphere and Japan and North America in the Northern Hemisphere. Two species are found in North America: A. gracilis and A. subflavidus. The majority of Austroboletus species form mycorrhizal relationships with plant species.

== Species ==
As of December 2023, Index Fungorum lists 38 valid species in the genus Austroboletus.

Image	Scientific name	Taxon author	Year	Distribution
	A. albidus	Yan C. Li & Zhu L. Yang	2021	China (Jiangxi)
	A. albovirescens	Yan C. Li & Zhu L. Yang	2021	China
	A. amazonicus	A.M. Vasco-Pal. & C. López-Quint.	2014	Colombia
	A. appendiculatus	Semwal, D. Chakr., K. Das, Indoliya, D. Chakrabarty, S. Adhikari & Karun.	2017	India
	A. asper	K. Syme, Bonito, T. Lebel, Fechner & Halling	2020	Queensland
	A. austrovirens	N.A. Fechner, Bougher, Bonito & Halling	2017	Queensland
	A. brunneisquamus	N.K. Zeng, Chang Xu & S. Jiang	2021	China
	A. cornalinus	(Perr.-Bertr. & R.Heim) E.Horak	1980	Gabon
	A. dictyotus	(Boedijn) Wolfe	1980	China (Hunan)
	A. eburneus	Watling & N.M.Greg.	1986	Queensland
	A. festivus	(Singer) Wolfe	1980	Brazil
	A. fusisporus	(Kawam. ex Imazeki & Hongo) Wolfe	1980	China (Yunnan)
	A. graciliaffinis	Singer	1988	north of Brazil and in Colombia and Venezuela
	A. gracilis	(Peck) Wolfe	1980	Mexico to Costa Rica
	A. heterospermus	(R.Heim & Perr.-Bertr.) Singer	1983	
	A. lacunosus (Kuntze)	T.W.May & A.E.Wood	1995	Australia, New caledonia and New Zealand
	A. latitubulosus	E.Horak	1980	Papua New Guinea
	A. malaccensis	(Pat. & C.F.Baker) Wolfe	1980	
	A. mucosus	(Corner) Wolfe	1980	
	A. mutabilis	Halling, Osmundson & M.A. Neves	2006	northern Australia
	A. neotropicalis	Singer, J.García & L.D.Gómez	1991	Costa Rica
	A. occidentalis	Watling & N.M.Greg.	1986	Australia and southeastern Tasmania
	A. olivaceobrunneus	Yan C. Li & Zhu L. Yang	2021	China
	A. olivaceoglutinosus	K.Das & Dentinger	2015	India (Sikkim), China (Yunnan)
	A. olivaceus	Singer	1983	
	A. purpurascens	(Heinem.) E.Horak	1980	Zaire
	A. rarus	(Corner) E.Horak	1980	Singapore and Australia
	A. rionegrensis	(Singer & I.J.Araujo) Singer	1983	Brazil.
	A. roseialbus	N.A. Fechner, Bonito, T. Lebel & Halling	2017	eastern New South Wales
	A. rostrupii	(Syd. & P.Syd.) E.Horak	1980	Thailand, Singapore
	A. rubiicolor	(Corner) E.Horak	1980	Singapore
	A. schichianus	(Teng & L.Ling) E.Horak	1980	China
	A. subflavidus	(Murrill) Wolfe	1980	United States(New Jersey to Florida and Texas) and Central America
	A. subvirens	(Hongo) Wolfe	1980	Japan, Papua New Guinea
	A. trinitatensis	Wolfe	1988	
	A. tristis	(Pat. & C.F.Baker) Wolfe	1980	
	A. viscidoviridis	N.A. Fechner, Bonito, T. Lebel & Halling	2017	Queensland
	A. yourkae	F.E. Guard, McMull.-Fish., Van Wyk, T. Lebel & Halling	2021	Queensland
