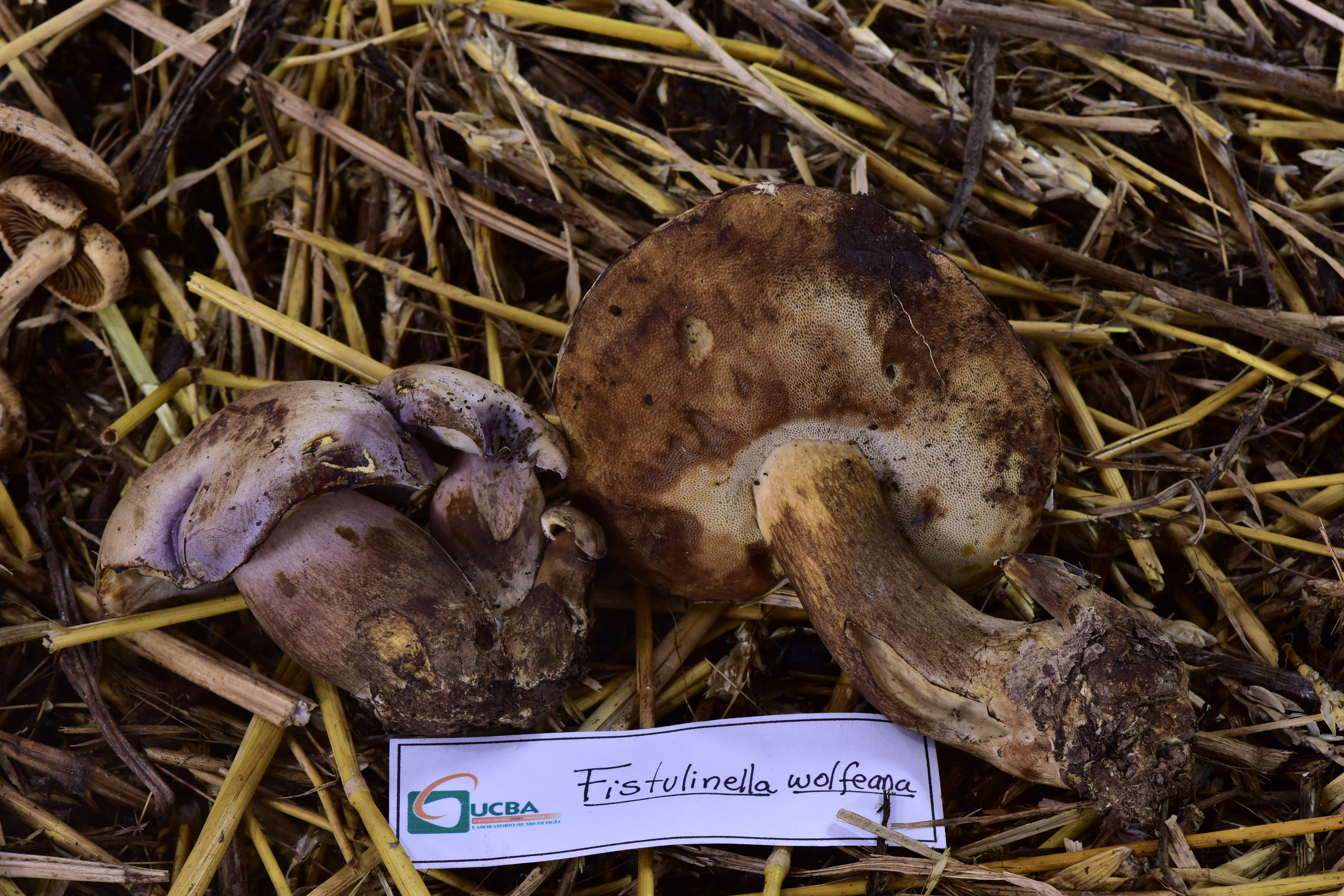

Scientific classification
- Kingdom: Fungi
- Division: Basidiomycota
- Class: Agaricomycetes
- Order: Boletales
- Family: Boletaceae
- Genus: Fistulinella
- Species: F. wolfeana

Binomial name
- Fistulinella wolfeana Singer, J.García & L.D.Gómez (1991)

= Fistulinella wolfeana =

Species of fungus

Fistulinella wolfeana
- Mycological characteristics
- Pores on hymenium
- Cap is flat or convex
- Stipe is bare
- Spore print is yellow
- Ecology is mycorrhizal
- Edibility is edible

Fistulinella wolfeana is a bolete fungus in the family Boletaceae found in eastern and southeastern Mexico, where it grows under pine and oak in mixed forest. It was described as new to science in 1991.

== Description ==
Fistulinella wolfeana has pink pores and tubes, which bruise orange to ochraceous red when touched. Its cap is sticky. It measures 30-150 mm, and can be flat to concave or convex. It is brown with pink to violet hues, and smooth. Its pores are 1-1.5 mm in diameter. Individual tubes are 7-20 mm long and white, though becoming pink with age. The stipe is dotted brown, and cylindrical, though it can have a bulbous base. The flesh of Fistulinella wolfeana is white, tending towards pink at its cap, or yellow at the base of its stipe. Its taste is mild.

Its spores measure 10-14 by 4.5-6 microns. They are yellow to ochre and roughly spindle-shaped, with some having a slight depression at the suprahilar plage. The basidia measure 23-28 x 9-11 microns, and have 4 spores each. The pleurocystidia measure 36-55 by 6-12 microns, and are spindle-shaped. They are transparent to yellow-tinted in KOH and have a red hue in Melzer's reagent. The cheilocystidia measure 38-60 x 5-12 microns, and have a similar shape, though they have an ochraceous colour.

== Distribution and Ecology ==
Fistulinella wolfeana is found mainly along the Trans-Mexican Volcanic Belt and part of the Sierra Madre del Sur mountain range in the states of Jalisco, Estado de Mexico, Guanajuato, Hidalgo, Morelos, Queretaro and Oaxaca. Its extent of occupancy is 150,000 km2.

Fistulinella wolfeana fruits solitarily and scattered. It is assumed to be ectomycorrhizal with Quercus liebmanii, Q. scytophylla and other Quercus (oak) species. It prefers altitudes of 1500-2300 meters.

== Conservation status ==
While there are many areas in Mexico Fistulinella wolfeana is known to grow in, the high deforestation in its habitat, including intentionally set fires, is projected to potentially decrease the population by 30% within 30 years. It is assessed by the Global Fungal Red List Initiative as Near Threatened, due to this habitat fragmentation.

== Uses ==
Fistulinella wolfeana is edible. It is eaten by the Otomi people in Amealco municipality in the state of Queretaro. It is known as Ushki jieth ´e”, meaning salty mushroom in the Otomi dialect.

== Gallery ==
Fistulinella wolfeana

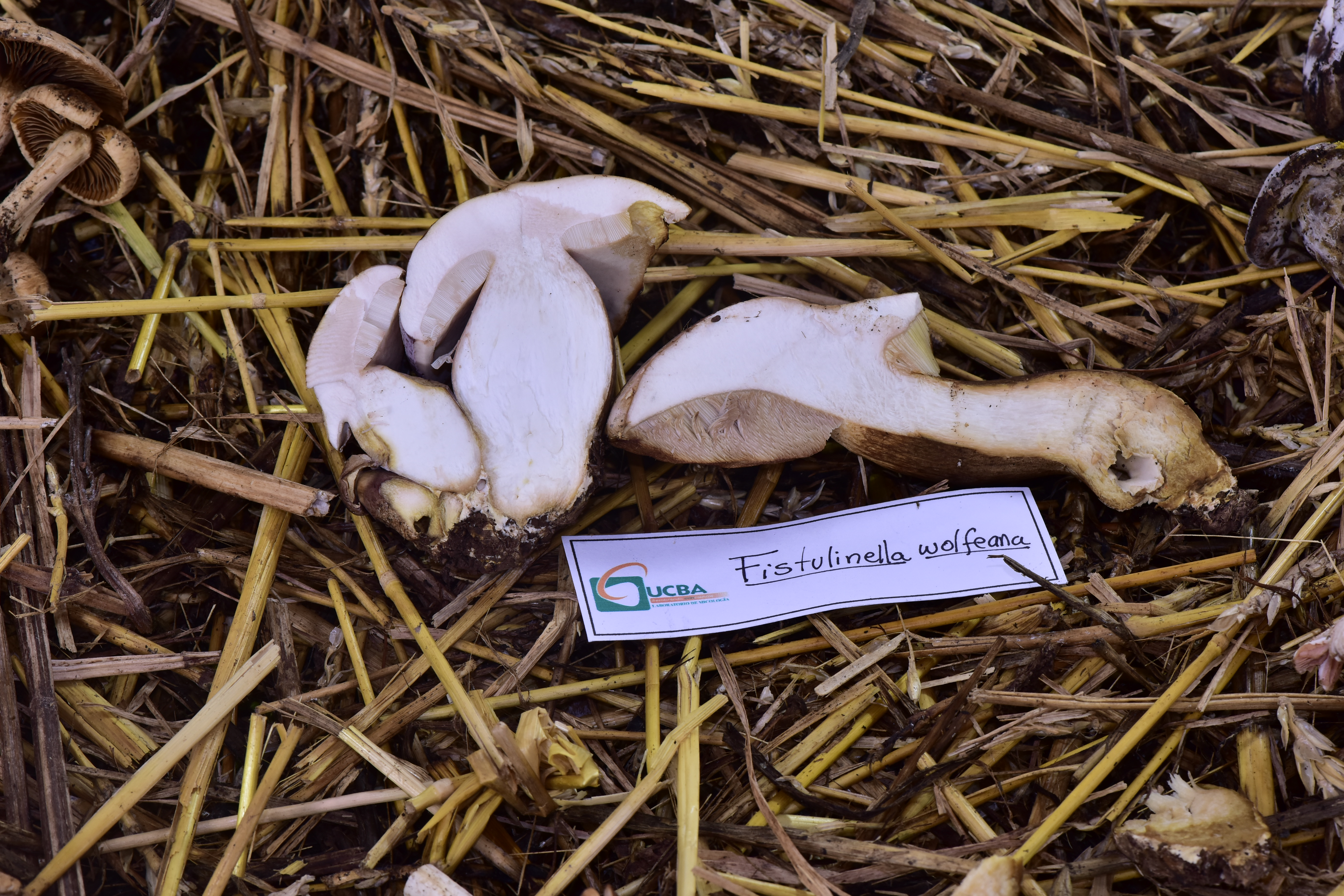
Cross section

== See also ==
- List of North American boletes
