= Austroboletus olivaceoglutinosus =

Scientific classification
- Kingdom: Fungi
- Division: Basidiomycota
- Class: Agaricomycetes
- Order: Boletales
- Family: Boletaceae
- Genus: Austroboletus
- Species: A. olivaceoglutinosus

Binomial name
- Austroboletus olivaceoglutinosus K. Das & Dentinger

Species of fungus

Austroboletus olivaceoglutinosus is a species of bolete fungus found in Sikkim in northeast India. It is so named for its sticky olive-green cap.

== Taxonomy ==
Austroboletus olivaceoglutinosus was described as new to science in 2015, after collections in subalpine forests in Sikkim. The species name is derived from the Latin words oliva "olive" and glūtĕn "glue", and refers to the mushroom's cap. Limited genetic testing showed an affinity to Austroboletus fusisporus.

== Description ==
The olive cap is 3 to 5.5 centimetres (1 1/4 to 2 1/4 in) diameter and fades to green-yellow with age, particularly at the margins. It is conical in shape initially, becoming more convex but not flat, and often has a central boss. The cap surface is very sticky, and often has dead insects stuck to it. Like other boletoid fungi, it has pores rather than gills on the cap underside. The cap margin covers the spore-bearing surface under the cap completely in young specimens. The pores are yellow-white when young, becoming more pinkish with age and staining red-grey when bruised or damaged. The cylindrical stem is 10 to 18 centimetres (4 to 7 in) high by 1.3 to 1.7 centimetres (1/2 to 3/4 in) wide, and is initially white and yellows with age. It is solid in young specimens, with the inner pith softening and leaving a hollow stem in older mushrooms. The mushroom has a pronounced fruity smell. The spore print is a reddish-tan colour, and the narrow-oval to spindle-shaped spores are 12.7–19.0 μm long by 5.9–7.7 μm wide. The flesh does not change colour when potassium hydroxide is applied to it, but the cap surface turns salmon-pink.

== Distribution and habitat ==
A. olivaceoglutinosus is native to northern Sikkim. The mushrooms appear in August and September in subalpine coniferous forests at an altitude of 2,800 metres (9,200 ft), under such trees as Sikkim spruce (Picea spinulosa), Bhutan fir (Abies densa), Sikkim larch (Larix griffithiana) and Himalayan hemlock (Tsuga dumosa).
