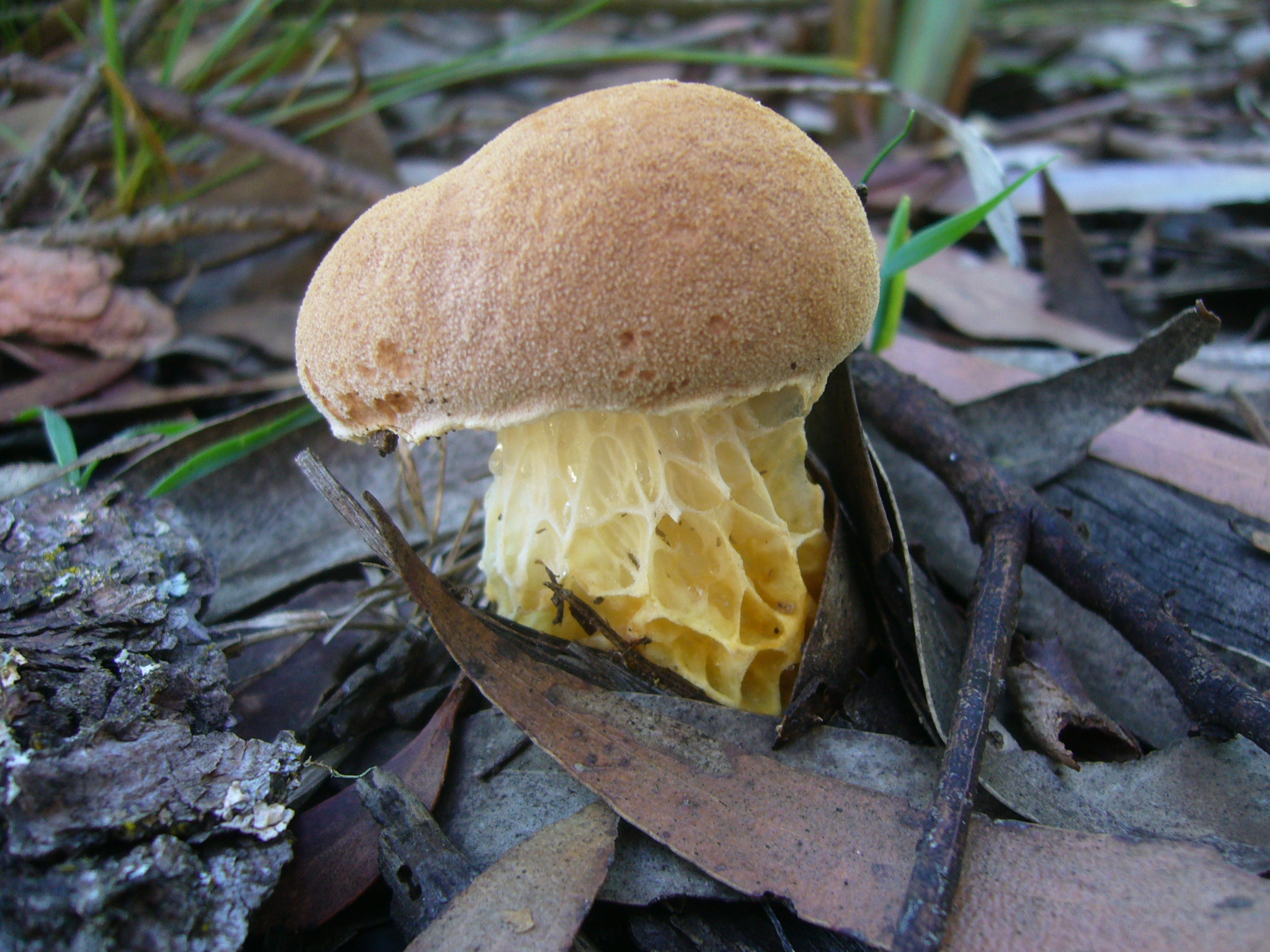
- Austroboletus occidentalis growing in New South Wales, Australia

Scientific classification
- Kingdom: Fungi
- Division: Basidiomycota
- Class: Agaricomycetes
- Order: Boletales
- Family: Boletaceae
- Genus: Austroboletus
- Species: A. occidentalis

Binomial name
- Austroboletus occidentalis Watling & N.M.Greg. (1986)

= Austroboletus occidentalis =

Species of fungus

Austroboletus occidentalis, commonly known as the ridge-stemmed bolete, is a species of bolete fungus found in Australia. It was described as new to science in 1986 by mycologists Roy Watling and Norma M. Gregory. The species name occidentalis is derived from the Latin occidens "west"..

The fruit body has a 5.5–10 cm diameter cap that has a texture reminiscent of suede or chamois and can be sticky/slimy when young. Initially orange- or pinkish-brown, it is subconical with a thickened margin, and flattens with age and fades an ochre colour. Like other boletes, it has tubes under the cap instead of gills. These are white in young specimens maturing to pink. The cylindrical white stipe is 7–16 cm tall and 1.7–2.5 cm wide, marked with deep lacunae. The white flesh bruises yellowish and has a bitter taste. The edibility is unknown. The spore print is brown, the spores are cylindrical, 15–19 x 5–6.5 μm and covered entirely with warty lumps.

Austroboletus occidentalis is a component of jarrah (Eucalyptus marginata) forests in southwestern Western Australia. It has been found in coastal scrub in southeastern Tasmania.

Austroboletus occidentalis establishes a new type of plant-fungus symbiosis (feremycorrhiza) with both woody plants (e.g. jarrah: Eucalyptus marginata) and herbaceous plants (such as wheat, barley), and even non-mycorrhizal plants such as canola. 'Fere' means 'nearly' in Latin; hence, the term 'feremycorrhiza' means 'nearly mycorrhiza'. The Australian native fungus A. occidentalis i) phylogenetically belongs to a biotrophic (ECM) lineage, ii) A. occidentalis possesses several established hallmarks of the ECM symbiosis, and iii) A. occidentalis does not enter roots and hence does not form any interface structures in the root. Therefore, it is not a fully developed mycorrhiza structurally; it is a 'nearly' mycorrhiza (with mycorrhiza-like effects on plant growth and nutrition). Austroboletus occidentalis has ECM lineage (Boletaceae) and several typical features of ECM fungi (e.g. strong phosphorus solubilization activity, biotrophic traits including a low number of PCWDE genes and lack of invertase (sucrose-hydrolyzing) enzymes. Furthermore, lack of root colonization in the feremycorrhizal symbiosis has presumably led to a broader range of host plants (woody/herbaceous plants; mycorrhizal/non-mycorrhizal plants), as compared to ECM fungi (e.g. ECM-forming Austroboletus species) that are, generally, limited to woody plants.
