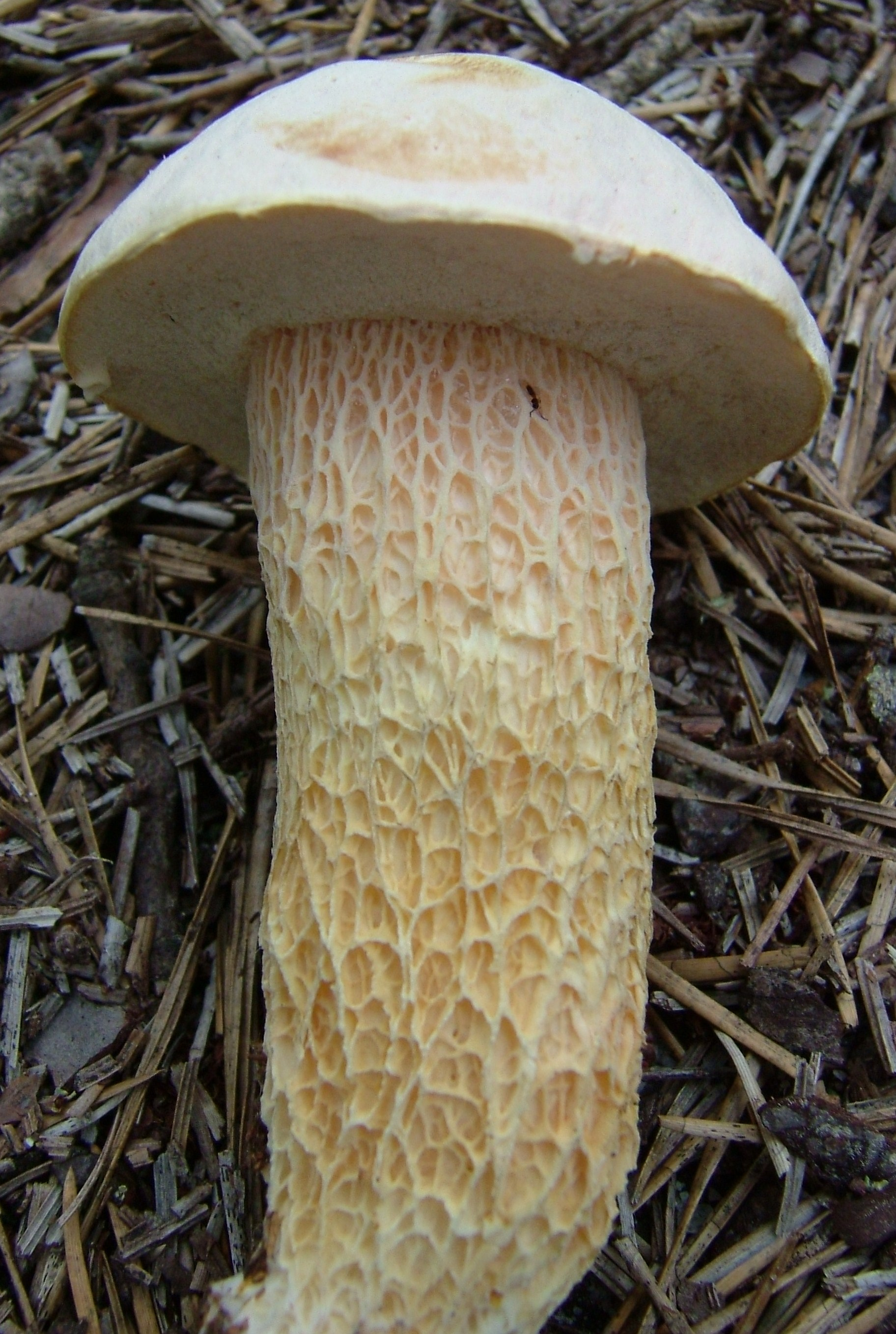

Scientific classification
- Domain: Eukaryota
- Kingdom: Fungi
- Division: Basidiomycota
- Class: Agaricomycetes
- Order: Boletales
- Family: Boletaceae
- Genus: Austroboletus
- Species: A. subflavidus

Binomial name
- Austroboletus subflavidus (Murrill) Wolfe (1980)

Synonyms
- Tylopilus subflavidus Murrill (1938); Boletus subflavidus (Murrill) Murrill (1938); Boletellus subflavidus (Murrill) Snell (1941); Porphyrellus subflavidus (Murrill) Singer (1945)

= Austroboletus subflavidus =

Species of fungus

Austroboletus subflavidus is a species of bolete fungus in the family Boletaceae. It is found in eastern North America, where it fruits near oak and pine trees. Originally described as a species of Tylopilus by American mycologist William Murrill in 1938, it was transferred to the genus Austroboletus by Carl B. Wolfe in 1980. The fruit body has a white to yellowish convex to flattened cap measuring 3–10 cm (1.2–3.9 in) in diameter. The pores on the cap underside, which measure about 1 mm wide, are initially white to grayish before becoming pinkish. The coarsely reticulate and pitted stipe measures 4.5–14.5 cm (1.8–5.7 in) long by 0.7–3 cm (0.3–1.2 in). The spore print is reddish brown; spores are spindle-shaped (fusoid) with dimensions of 15–20 by 6–9 μm.

== See also ==
- List of North American boletes
