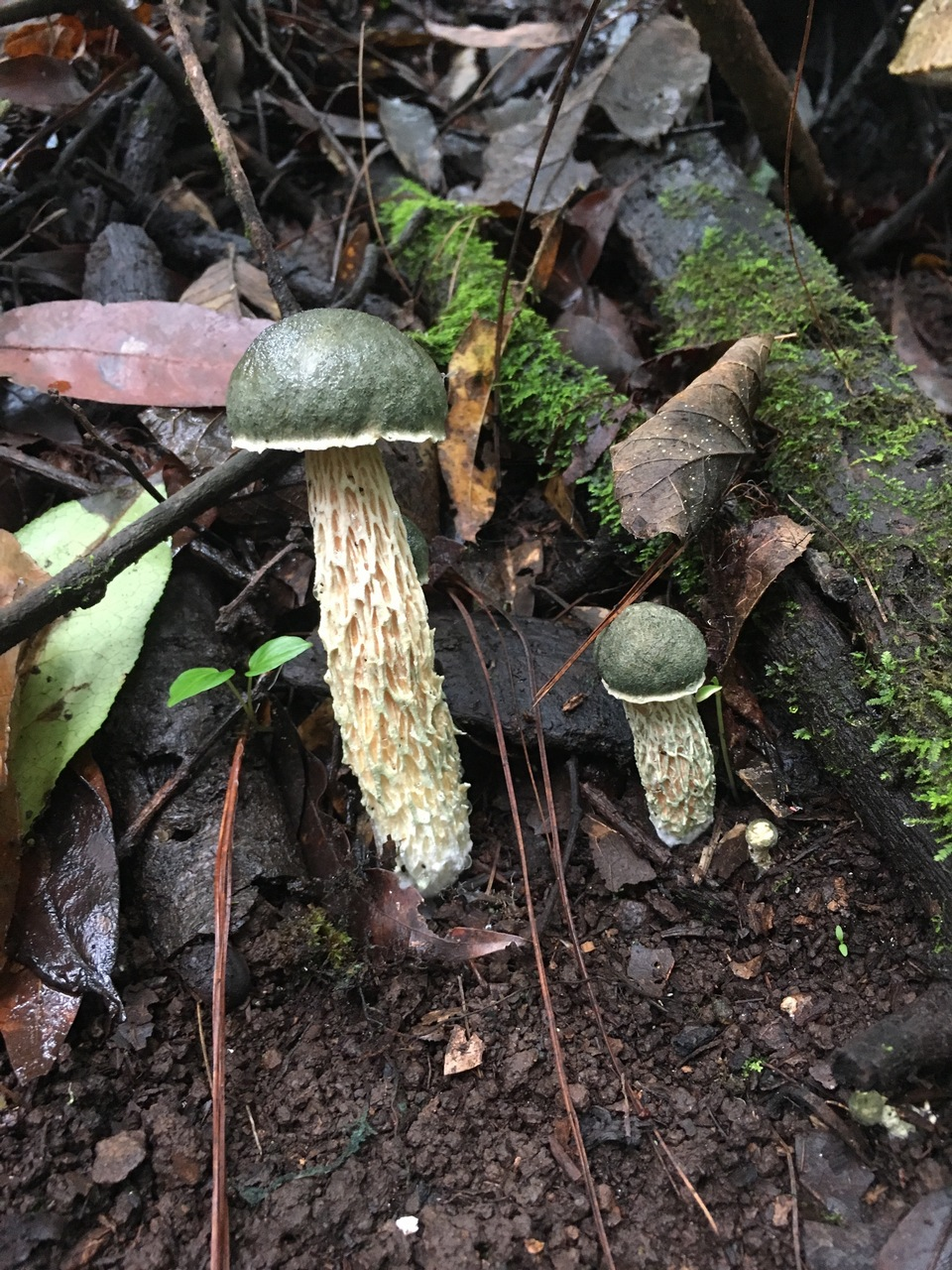

Scientific classification
- Domain: Eukaryota
- Kingdom: Fungi
- Division: Basidiomycota
- Class: Agaricomycetes
- Order: Boletales
- Family: Boletaceae
- Genus: Austroboletus
- Species: A. neotropicalis

Binomial name
- Austroboletus neotropicalis Singer, J.García & L.D.Gómez (1991)

= Austroboletus neotropicalis =

Species of fungus

Austroboletus neotropicalis is a bolete fungus found in Costa Rica, where it grows under oak.
