= Fistulinella alfaroae =

Scientific classification
- Domain: Eukaryota
- Kingdom: Fungi
- Division: Basidiomycota
- Class: Agaricomycetes
- Order: Boletales
- Family: Boletaceae
- Genus: Fistulinella
- Species: F. alfaroae

Binomial name
- Fistulinella alfaroae Singer & L.D.Gómez (1991)

Species of fungus

Fistulinella alfaroae is a bolete fungus in the family Boletaceae found in Costa Rica. It grows with Monotropa under oak in montane forest. It was described as new to science in 1991.
