= Roy Halling =

American mycologist (born 1950)

- Born: 31 December 1950; Perry
- Alma mater: San Francisco State University; University of Massachusetts Amherst; California State University, Stanislaus; Glendale Community College; Crescenta Valley High School

Roy Edward Halling (born December 31, 1950, in Perry, Iowa) is an American mycologist.

Halling specializes in the study of mushroom-forming fungi, especially the taxonomy, ecology, and systematics of the Boletineae, a suborder of the Boletales, and is widely published in this area. He is currently emeritus curator of mycology at the New York Botanical Garden, and was an adjunct professor at Columbia University.

Halling received his master's degree from San Francisco State University in 1976, with a thesis titled "The Boletaceae of the Sierra Nevada", under the supervision of Harry Delbert Thiers. His PhD was from the University of Massachusetts Amherst, in 1980 with a dissertation titled "The genus Collybia in New England. His supervisor was Howard E. Bigelow.

Halling has served as the associate editor of the journal Brittonia (1984–1989), the managing editor of Mycologia (1986–1996), and as the associate editor of the latter journal from 2002–2004.

Halling was the president of the Mycological Society of America in 2008–2009. The bolete fungus Austroboletus mutabilis was only identified in North Queensland, Australia, by Halling, Osmondson and Neves in a 2006 article while the fungus Austroboletus rarus was identified by Halling and another group of mycologists in 2020. Finally, the bolete fungus Austroboletus austrovirens, which is native to Northern Australia, also bears his name in its taxonomy.

== Selected publications ==
- Halling, R.E. 1989. "Notes on Collybia III. Three neotropical species of subg. Rhodocollybia". Mycologia 81(6):870–875.
- Tulloss, R.E.; Ovrebo, C.L.; Halling, R.E. 1992. "Studies on Amanita (Amanitaceae) from Andean Colombia". Memoirs of the New York Botanical Garden 66:1–46.
- Mueller, G.M.; Halling, R.E. 1995. "Evidence for high biodiversity of Agaricales (Fungi) in neotropical montane Quercus forests". In: S. Churchill, H. Balslev, E. Forero, & J. Luteyn, (eds.). Biodiversity and Conservation of Neotropical Montane Forests. New York Botanical Garden, Bronx.
- Halling, R.E. 1996. "Boletaceae (Agaricales): Latitudinal biodiversity and biological interactions in Costa Rica and Colombia". Revista de Biología Tropical 44(Supplement 4):111–114.
- Antonín, V.; Halling, R.E.; Noordeloos, M.E. 1997. "Generic concepts within the groups of Marasmius and Collybia sensu lato". "Mycotaxon" 63:359–368
- Fulgenzi, T.D.; Mayor, J.R.; Henkel, T.W; Halling, R.E. 2008. "New species of Boletellus from Guyana." Mycologia 100(30):490–495.

== See also ==
- Category:Taxa named by Roy Halling
