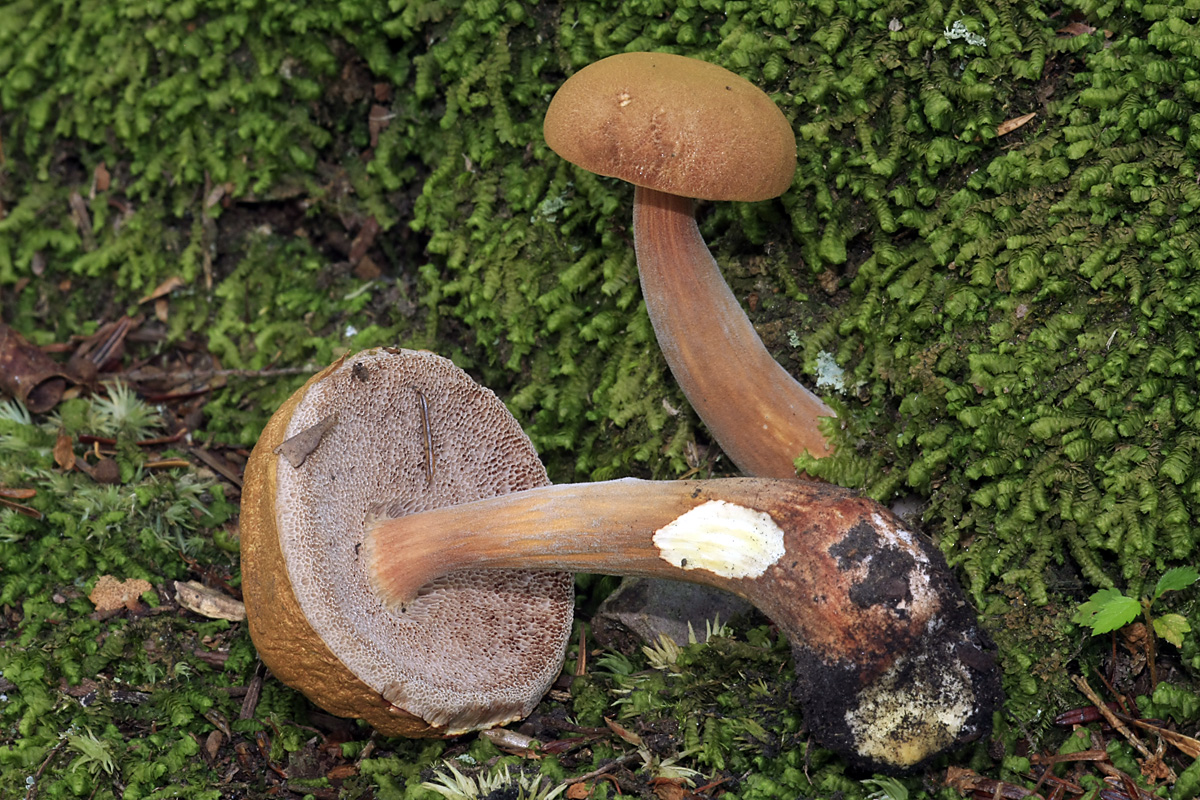

Scientific classification
- Domain: Eukaryota
- Kingdom: Fungi
- Division: Basidiomycota
- Class: Agaricomycetes
- Order: Boletales
- Family: Boletaceae
- Genus: Austroboletus
- Species: A. gracilis

Binomial name
- Austroboletus gracilis (Peck) Wolfe (1979)

Synonyms
- Boletus gracilis Peck (1872); Tylopilus gracilis (Peck) Henn. (1898); Porphyrellus gracilis (Peck) Singer (1945)

= Austroboletus gracilis =

Species of fungus

Austroboletus gracilis is a species of bolete fungus in the family Boletaceae. Originally described as Boletus gracilis by Charles Horton Peck in 1872, it was transferred to the genus Austroboletus by Carl B. Wolfe in 1979.

== See also ==
- List of North American boletes
