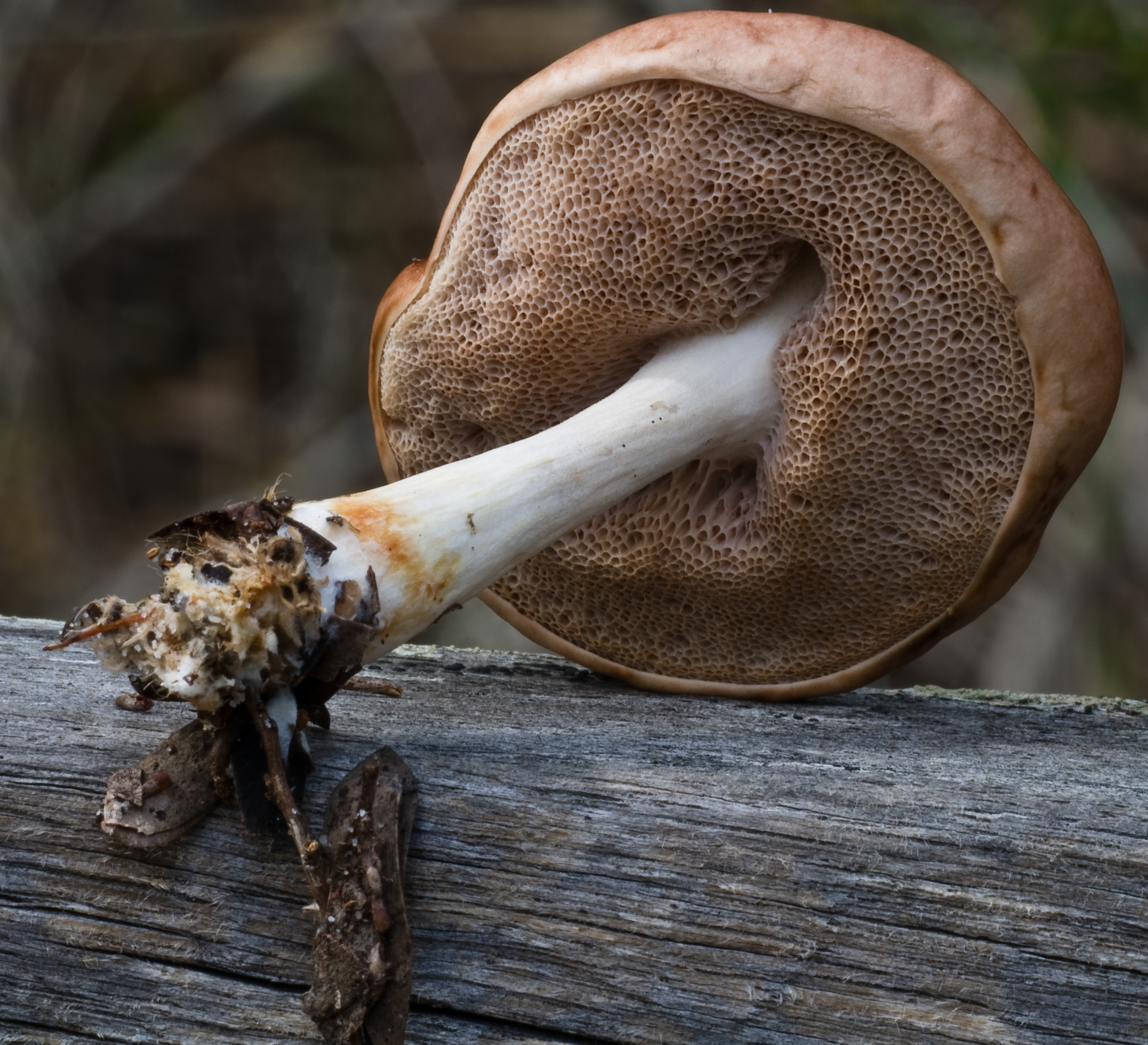

Scientific classification
- Domain: Eukaryota
- Kingdom: Fungi
- Division: Basidiomycota
- Class: Agaricomycetes
- Order: Boletales
- Family: Boletaceae
- Genus: Fistulinella
- Species: F. mollis

Binomial name
- Fistulinella mollis Watling (1989)

Synonyms
- Boletus mollis Cleland (1934); Gastrotylopilus brunneus T.H. Li & Watling (1999); Tylopilus mollis K.Syme (1992)

= Fistulinella mollis =

Species of fungus

Fistulinella mollis, commonly known as the marshmallow bolete, is a bolete fungus in the family Boletaceae found in Australia.

John Burton Cleland originally described the marshmallow bolete as Boletus mollis in 1934, the species name being the Latin adjective mollis "soft". It was classified in the genus Fistulinella by Roy Watling. Common names include caramel-capped bolete or marshmallow bolete from its soft consistency.

The red- or caramel-brown cap ranges from 3 to 8.5 cm in diameter and is extremely soft. It is prone to infestation by insects or decay from microbes. Hemispherical when young, it has a smooth and sticky surface and becomes paler and flatter with age. The tubes are cream when young and age to pink, and are adnexed to adnate. The individual pores are 0.5 mm wide. The narrow cylindrical stem is 5–8 cm tall by 0.5-1.2 mm wide, and white staining to yellow with bruising. The soft white flesh has little taste or odour. The spore print is brown. The spores measure 12.5-16.5 x 4-5 μm.

The related Australian species Fistulinella rodwayi can be distinguished by its purple-tinged cap and Fistulinella prunicolor by its smaller pores.

Fistulinella mollis has been recorded from Mount Wellington in Tasmania. It is found in eucalypt forest, where it is often found on rotting wood or bark.
