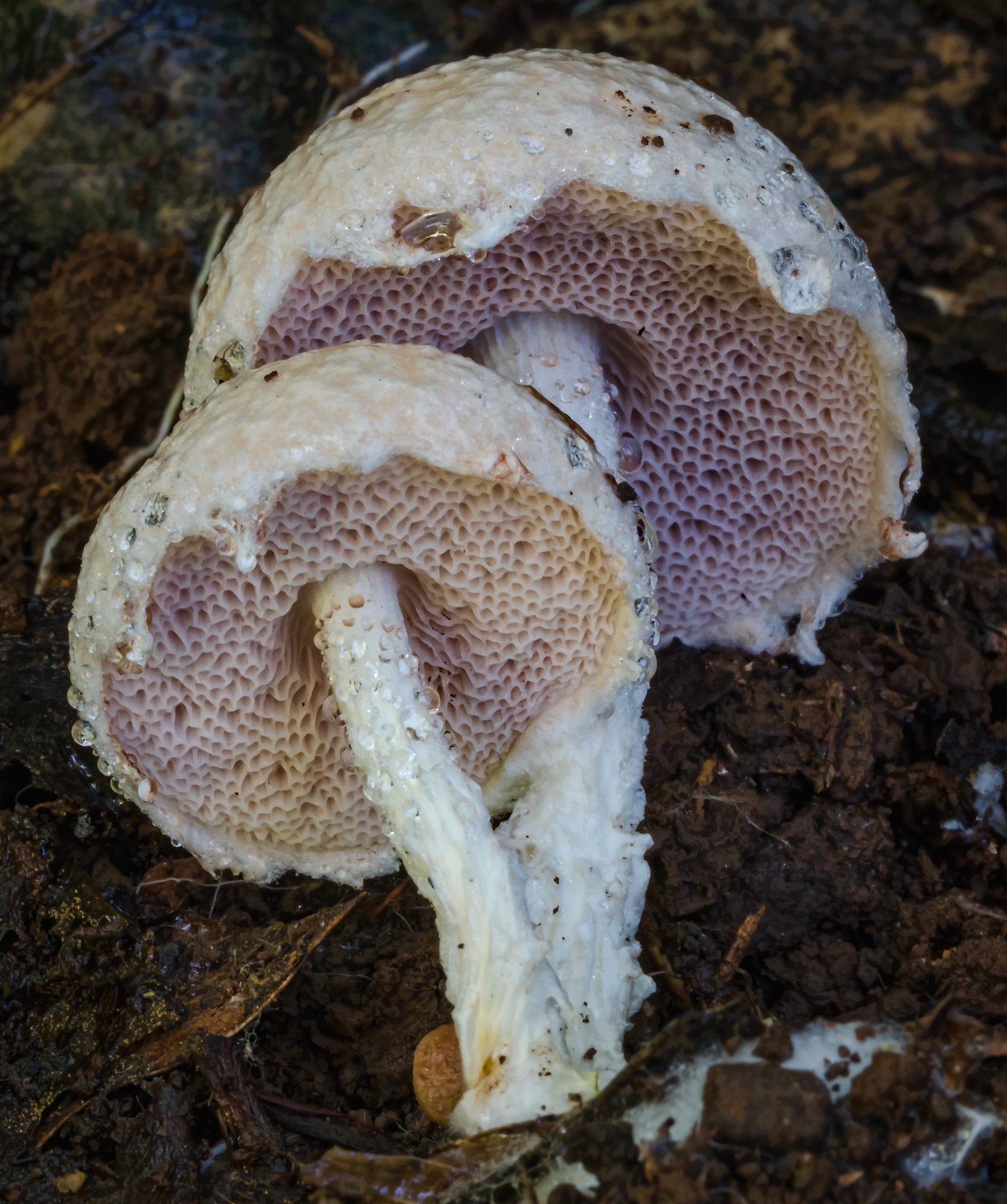

Scientific classification
- Domain: Eukaryota
- Kingdom: Fungi
- Division: Basidiomycota
- Class: Agaricomycetes
- Order: Boletales
- Family: Boletaceae
- Genus: Austroboletus
- Species: A. eburneus

Binomial name
- Austroboletus eburneus Watling & N.M.Greg. (1986)

= Austroboletus eburneus =

Species of fungus

Austroboletus eburneus is a species of bolete fungus found in Australia. It was described as new to science in 1986. The species name eburneus is the Latin adjective "ivory-white".
