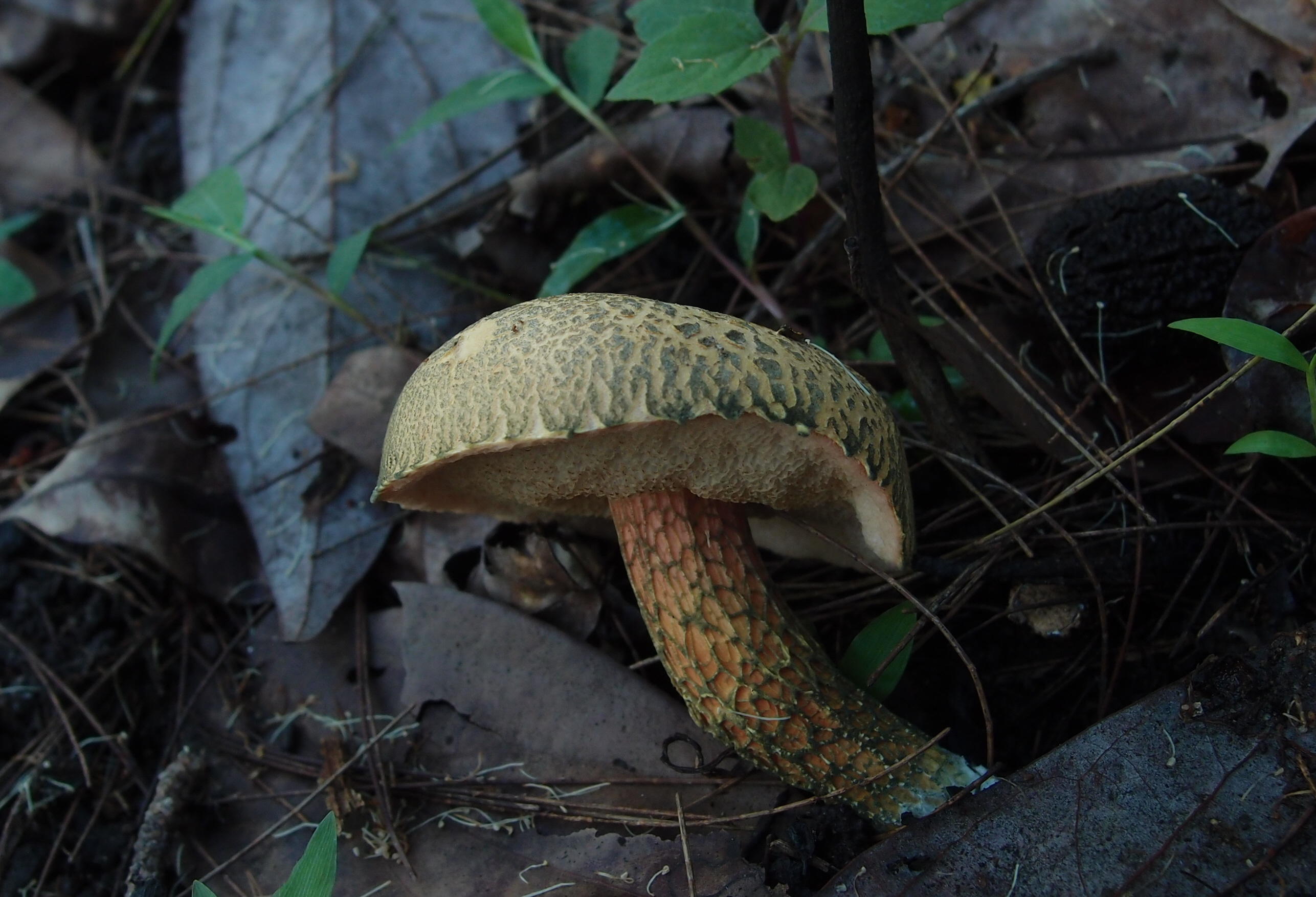
- The Austroboletus austrovirens fungus in North Queensland, Australia

Scientific classification
- Kingdom: Fungi
- Division: Basidiomycota
- Class: Agaricomycetes
- Order: Boletales
- Family: Boletaceae
- Genus: Austroboletus
- Species: A. austrovirens

Binomial name
- Austroboletus austrovirens Fechner, Bougher, Bonito & Halling

= Austroboletus austrovirens =

Species of fungus

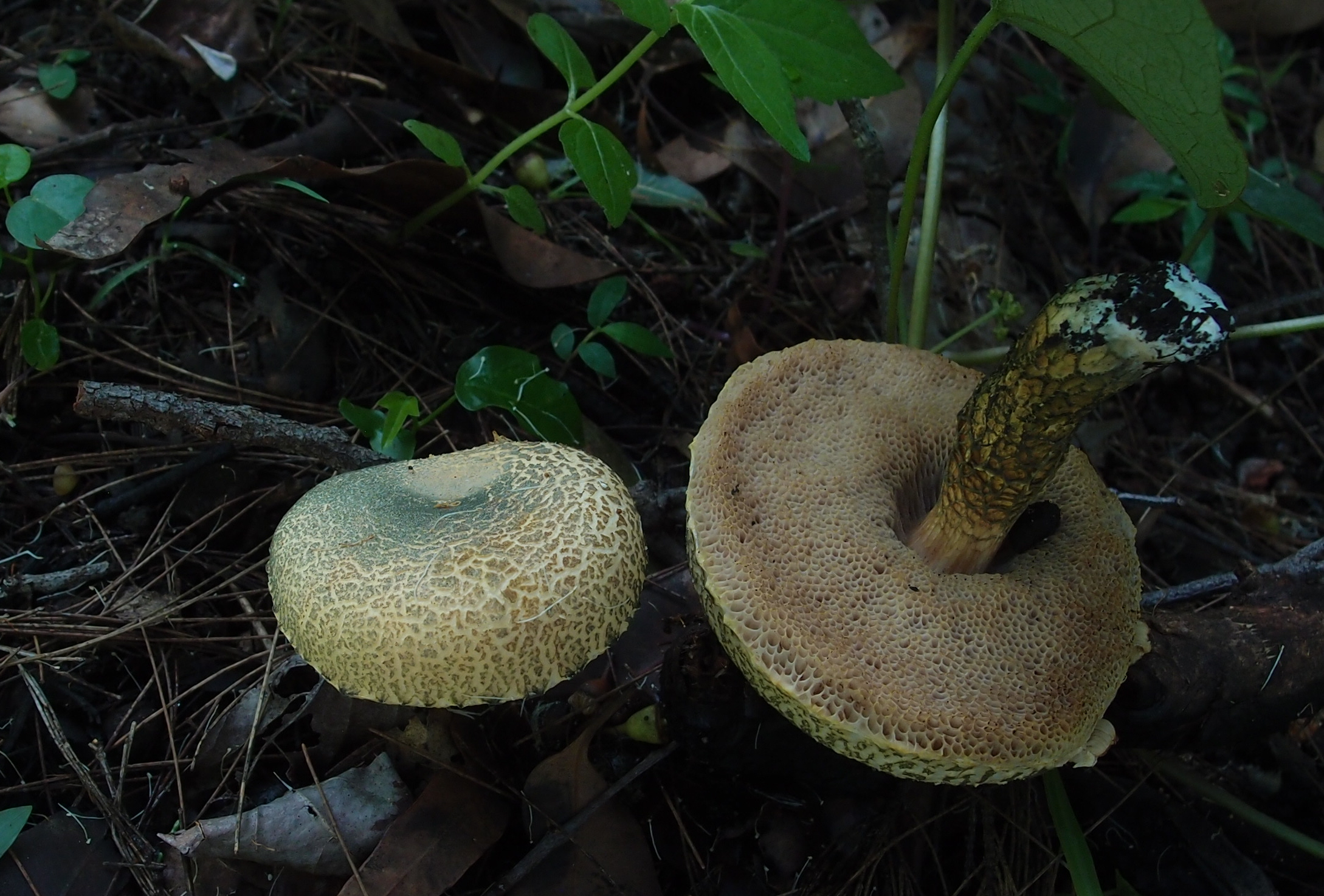
A second view of the Austroboletus mutabilis fungus in North Queensland Australia.

Austroboletus austrovirens is a species of bolete fungus found in northern Australia, particularly in northern Queensland and the Northern Territory of Australia. This species was first identified in 2017 by the mycologists N.A. Fechner, Bougher, Bonito & Roy Halling. This species is native to North Queensland, Australia and has a stipe of 5 or 6 to 11 centimetres long and a cap or pileus which is 2.5 to 4.5 centimetres broad. Austroboletus austrovirens is distinguished by its features "of dry, green pigments on its pileus and stipe reticulum in combination with apricot orange pigments on its stipe surface." According to the Queensland Government, this species conservancy status has the “least concern”—which means that it is not at threat of extinction.
