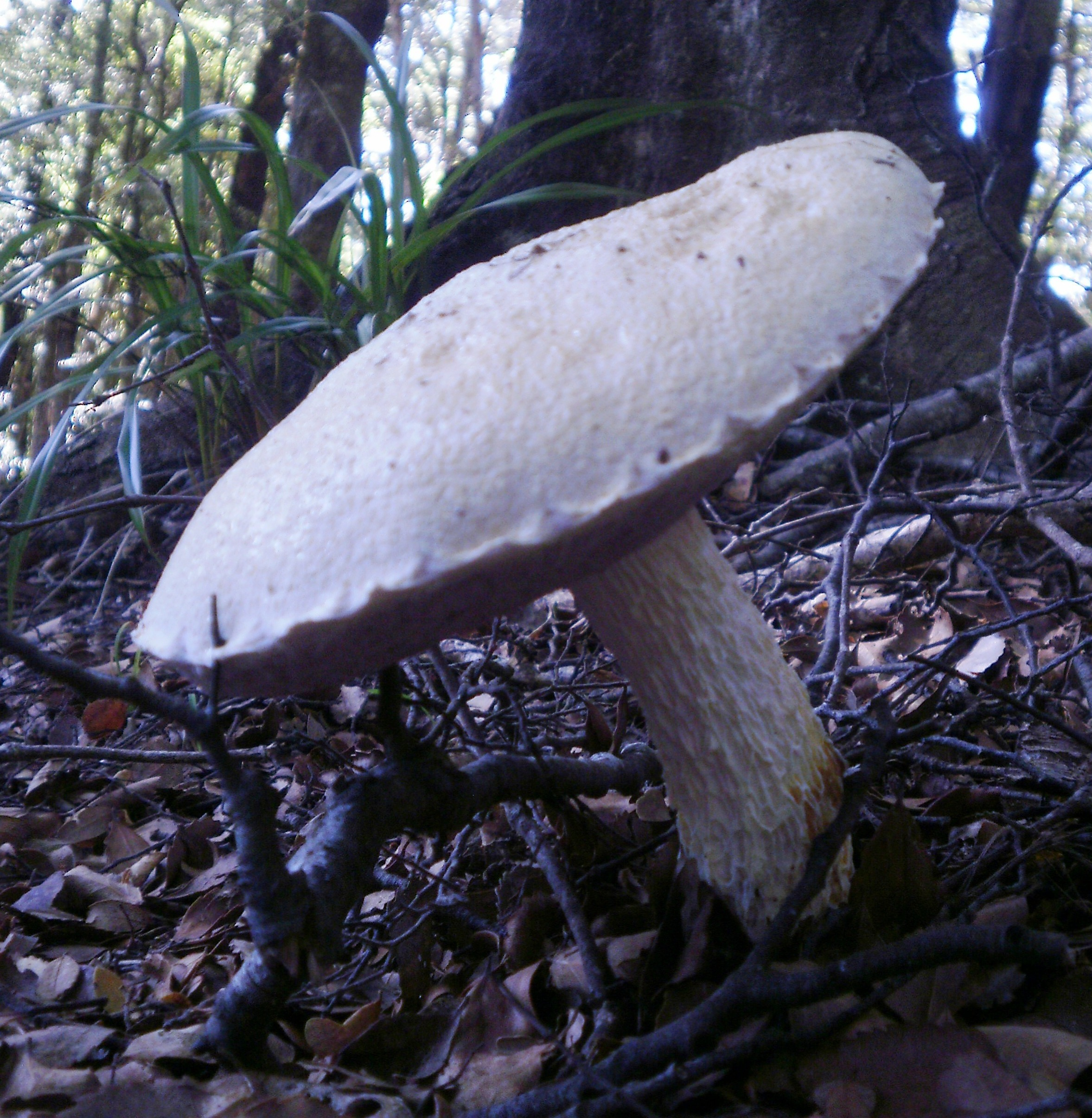

Scientific classification
- Kingdom: Fungi
- Division: Basidiomycota
- Class: Agaricomycetes
- Order: Boletales
- Family: Boletaceae
- Genus: Fistulinella
- Species: F. nivea

Binomial name
- Fistulinella nivea (G.Stev.) Singer (1983)

Synonyms
- Tylopilus niveus G.Stev. (1962); Porphyrellus niveus (G.Stev.) McNabb (1967); Austroboletus niveus (G.Stev.) Wolfe (1980)

= Fistulinella nivea =

Species of fungus

Fistulinella nivea is a species of bolete fungus in the family Boletaceae found in New Zealand. First described by mycologist Greta Stevenson in 1962 as a species of Tylopilus, it was transferred to the genus Fistulinella by Rolf Singer. Stevenson originally discovered the bolete in 1955 at Tōtaranui, where it was growing under Nothofagus.

== Description ==
Its fruitbody has a white cap with a diameter of up to 3 cm (1.2 in) atop a stipe measuring up 7 cm (2.8 in) long and 1–1.5 cm (0.4–0.6 in) thick. The pores on the cap underside are up to 1.5 mm in diameter. The pore surface is initially white before changing to pale pink. Spores are ellipsoid, hyaline (translucent), and measure 17–18 by 6–7 μm.
