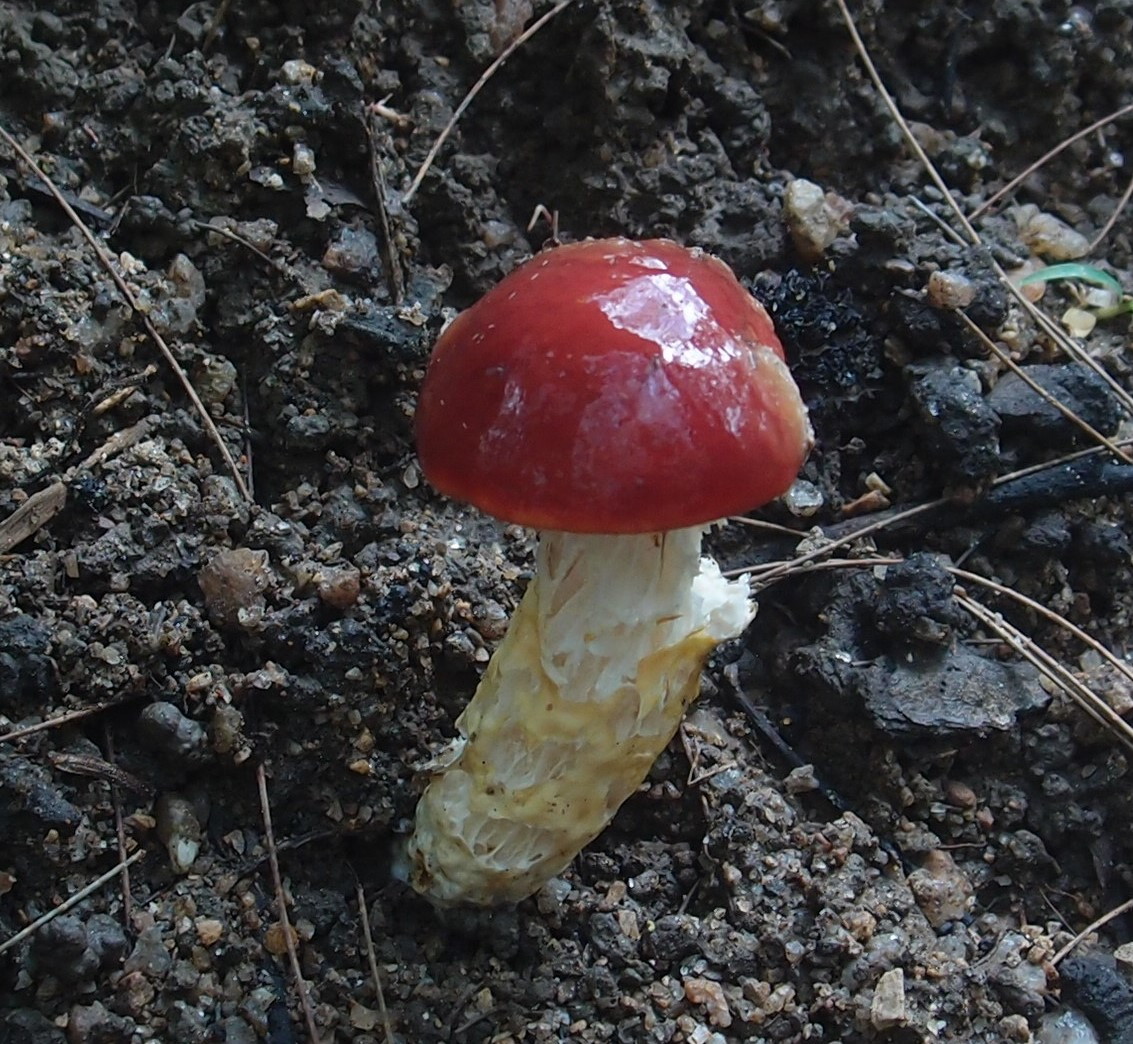
- The Austroboletus mutabilis fungus with a red cap in Queensland, Australia

Scientific classification
- Kingdom: Fungi
- Division: Basidiomycota
- Class: Agaricomycetes
- Order: Boletales
- Family: Boletaceae
- Genus: Austroboletus
- Species: A. mutabilis

Binomial name
- Austroboletus mutabilis Halling, Osmundson & M.A.Neves (2006)

= Austroboletus mutabilis =

Species of fungus

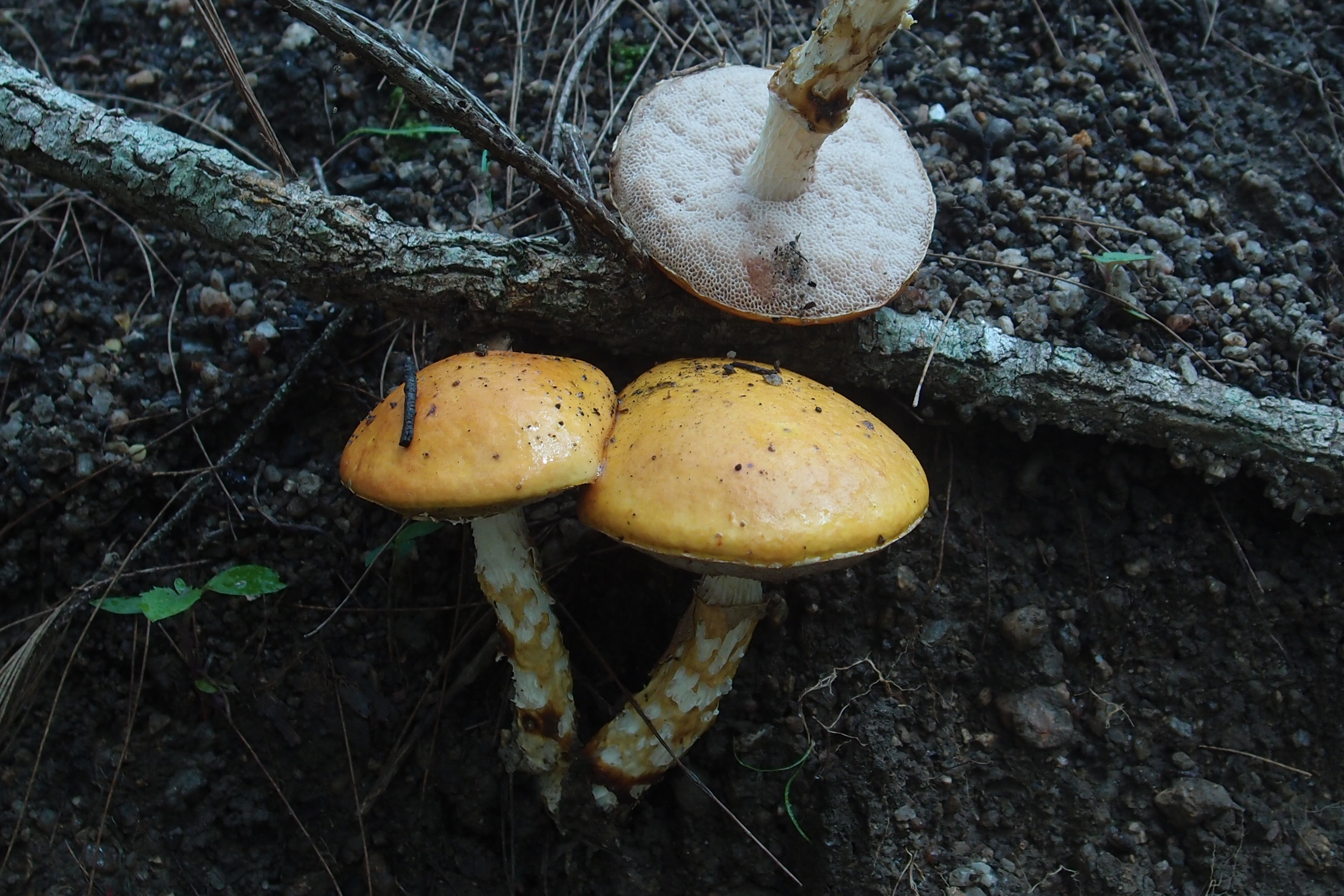
The Austroboletus mutabilis fungus with a yellow cap.

Austroboletus mutabilis is a species of bolete fungus found in northern Australia. Described as new to science in 2006, it grows in dry sclerophyll woodlands. This bolete is characterised by its colour change—from deep red to orange and, finally, to yellow—that occurs in the cap. Almost no other Bolete goes through such a dramatic colour change as this species and this change may occur as a consequence of time, exposure to sunlight and/or local humidity. Microscopically, the suprahilar plage on spores of A. mutabilis is conspicuous and appears to lack the obvious ornamentation present on the rest of the spore. While the plage appears smooth under the light microscope, scanning electron micrography shows a large, irregular pit or erosion of that region which seems to develop with maturation.

Austroboletus mutabilis was identified as a new species of Austroboletus by Roy Halling, Todd Osmundson and Maria Alice Neves in a 2006 article and is known to grow at a few sites in North Queensland, Australia.

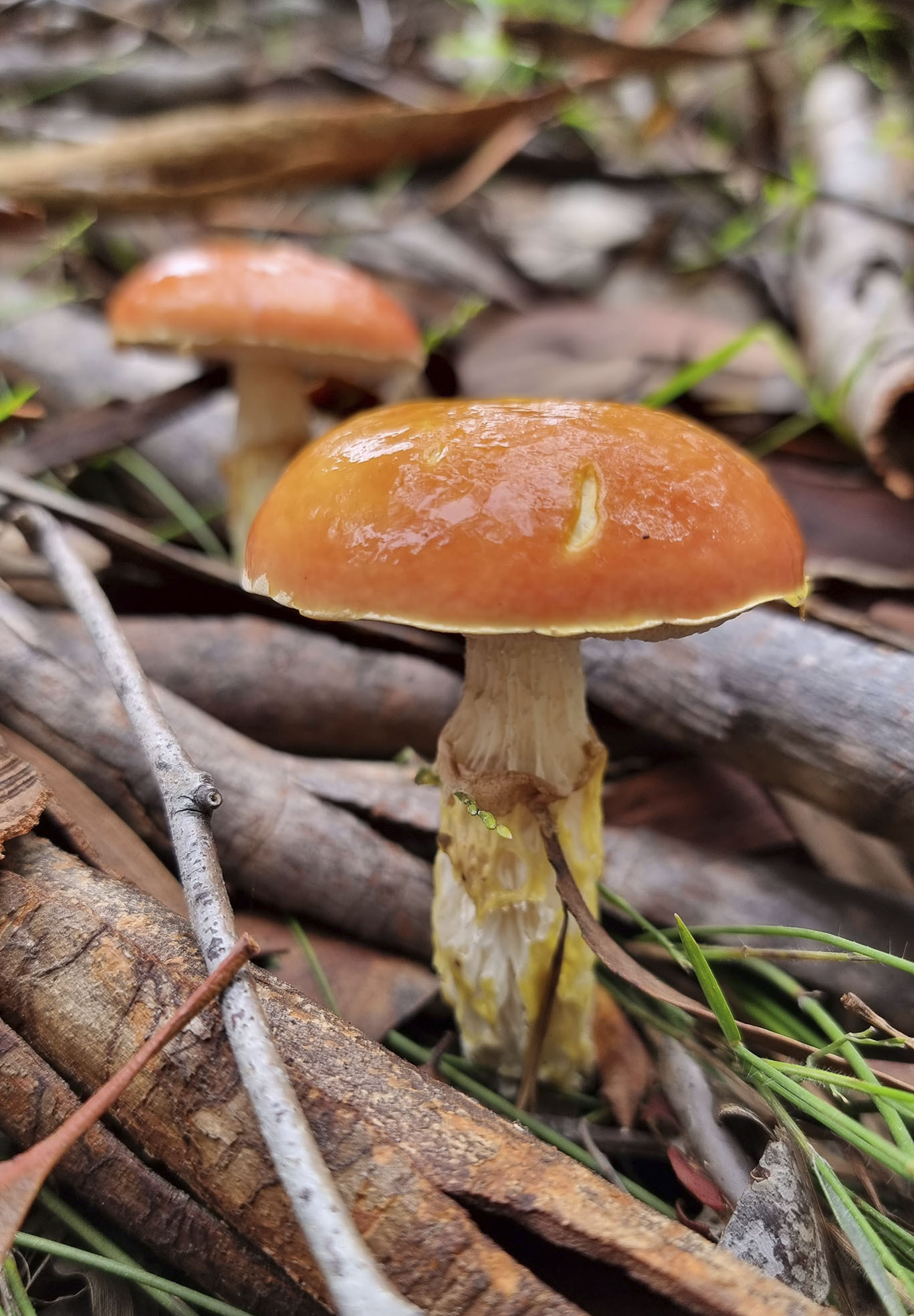
A view of the Austroboletus mutabilis fungi with an orange cap
