= Quercus scytophylla =

Conservation status
- Least Concern (IUCN 3.1)

Scientific classification
- Kingdom: Plantae
- Clade: Embryophytes
- Clade: Tracheophytes
- Clade: Spermatophytes
- Clade: Angiosperms
- Clade: Eudicots
- Clade: Rosids
- Order: Fagales
- Family: Fagaceae
- Genus: Quercus
- Subgenus: Quercus subg. Quercus
- Section: Quercus sect. Lobatae
- Species: Q. scytophylla

Binomial name
- Quercus scytophylla Liebm.

Synonyms
- Quercus campanariensis Trel.

Species of oak tree

Quercus scytophylla is a species of oak. It is a tree native to western and central Mexico from Sonora and Chihuahua to Chiapas.

Quercus scytophylla is a deciduous tree growing up to 20 metres (66 feet) tall with a trunk as much as 50 centimetres (20 inches) in diameter. The leaves are thick and leathery, up to 20 cm (8 in) long, with a few tapering, pointed teeth along the edges.

It is native to the Sierra Madre Occidental, Trans-Mexican Volcanic Belt, Sierra Madre del Sur, and Sierra Madre de Chiapas. It grows in pine-oak forest and humid montane forests from 1,500 to 2,500 metres elevation. It can be a dominant tree in the western Sierra Madre Occidental.
