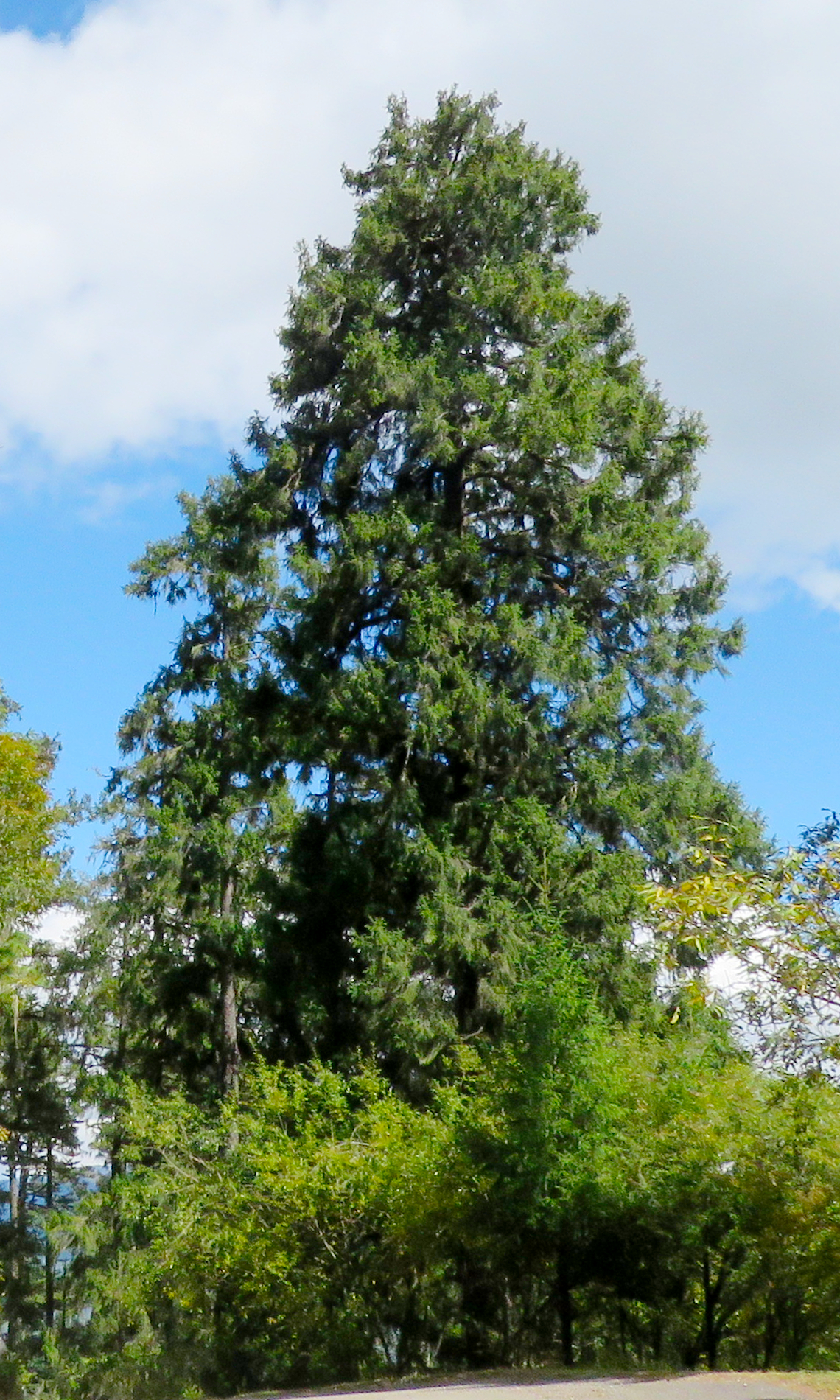

Conservation status
- Least Concern (IUCN 3.1)

Scientific classification
- Kingdom: Plantae
- Clade: Tracheophytes
- Clade: Gymnospermae
- Division: Pinophyta
- Class: Pinopsida
- Order: Pinales
- Family: Pinaceae
- Genus: Picea
- Species: P. spinulosa

Binomial name
- Picea spinulosa (Griff.) A.Henry

Synonyms
- Abies spinulosa Griff.; Pinus spinulosa (Griff.) Griff.; Picea morindoides Rehder; Picea spinulosa var. pseudobrachytyla Silba; Picea spinulosa subsp. pseudobrachytyla (Silba) Silba; Picea spinulosa subsp. yatungensis (Silba) Silba; Picea spinulosa var. yatungensis Silba

= Picea spinulosa =

Sikkim spruce

Species of conifer

Picea spinulosa, the Sikkim spruce, is a spruce native to the eastern Himalaya, in India (Sikkim), Nepal and Bhutan. It grows at altitudes of 2,400-3,700 m in mixed coniferous forests.

It is a large evergreen tree growing to 40–55 m tall (exceptionally to 65 m), and with a trunk diameter of up to 1–2.5 m. It has a conical crown with level branches and usually pendulous branchlets.

The shoots are whitish to pale buff, and glabrous (hairless). The leaves are needle-like, 1.7-3.2 cm long, slender, rhombic to slightly flattened in cross-section, glossy green on the upper side, with two conspicuous blue-white stomatal bands on the lower side. The cones are cylindric-conic, 6–12 cm long and 2 cm broad, green or tinged reddish when young, maturing glossy orange-brown to red-brown and opening to 3 cm broad, 5–7 months after pollination; the scales are moderately stiff, with a bluntly pointed apex.

Sikkim spruce is occasionally grown as an ornamental tree in large gardens in western and central Europe for its attractive pendulous branchlets.
