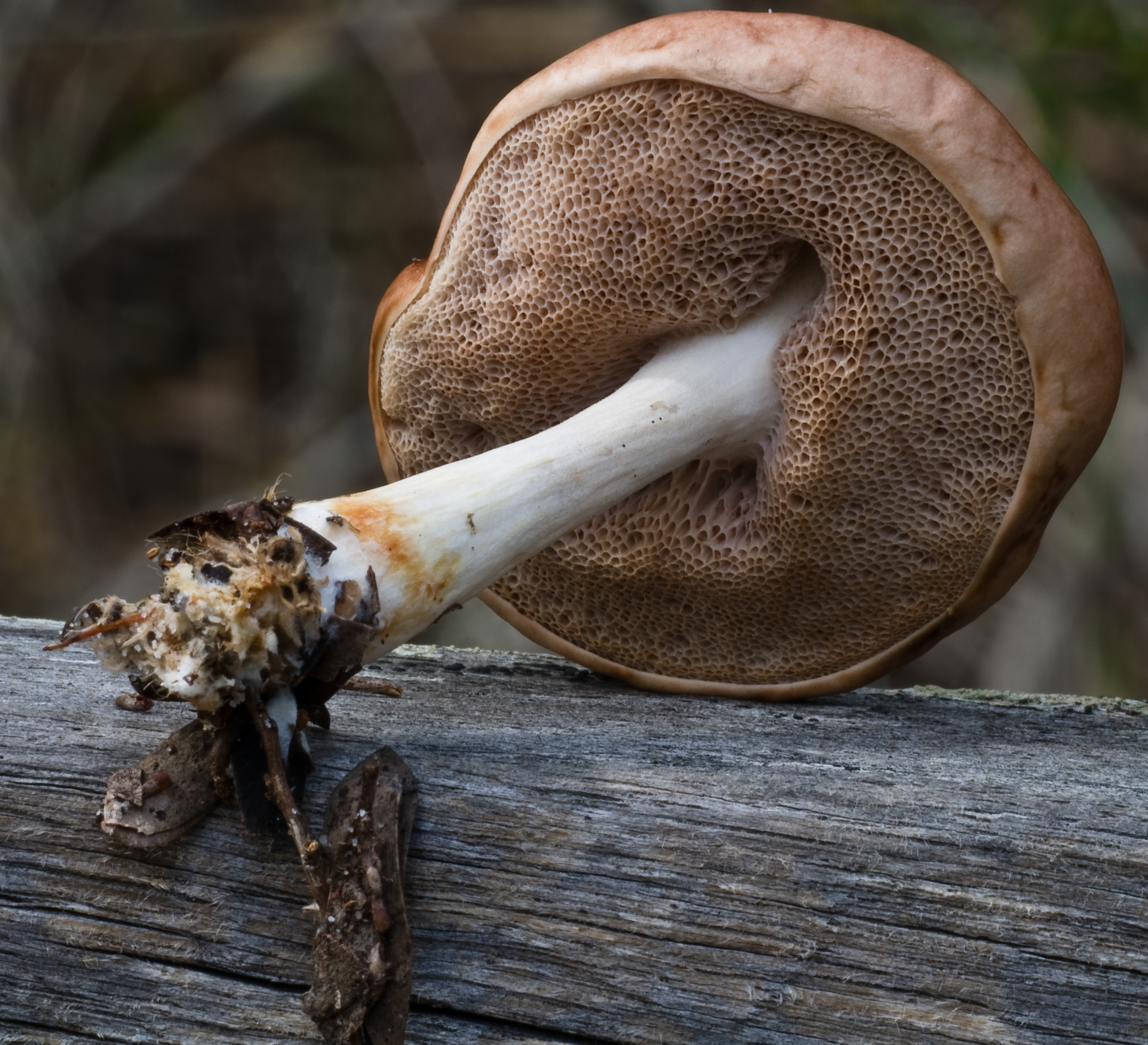
- Fistulinella mollis

Scientific classification
- Domain: Eukaryota
- Kingdom: Fungi
- Division: Basidiomycota
- Class: Agaricomycetes
- Order: Boletales
- Family: Boletaceae
- Genus: Fistulinella; Henn. (1901)

Type species
- Fistulinella staudtii Henn. (as 'staudii') (1901)

Synonyms
- Gastrotylopilus T.H.Li & Watling (1999); Mucilopilus Wolfe (1979)

= Fistulinella =

Genus of fungi

Fistulinella is a genus of bolete fungi in the family Boletaceae. The genus has a pantropical distribution, and contains 15 species. Fistulinella was circumscribed by German mycologist Paul Christoph Hennings in 1901.

== Species ==
Image	Name	Authority	Year	Distribution
	F. alfaroae	Singer & L.D.Gómez	1991	Costa Rica
	F. campinaranae	Singer	1978	Brazil
	F. cinereoalba	Fulgenzi & T.W.Henkel	2010	Guyana
	F. conica	(Ravenel) Pegler & T.W.K.Young	1981	USA, Mexico
	F. gloeocarpa	Pegler	1983	Martinique
	F. guzmaniana	Singer, J.García & L.D.Gómez	1991	Mexico
	F. jamaicensis	(Murrill) Singer	1983	Jamaica, Troy
	F. lutea	Redeuilh & Soop	2006 (2007)	New Zealand
	F. major	(R.Heim ex E.Horak) Redeuilh & Soop	2007	
	F. mexicana	Guzmán	1974	Mexico
	F. minor	Guzmán	1974	Mexico
	F. mollis	Watling	1989	Australia
	F. nivea	(G.Stev.) Singer	1983	New Zealand
	F. nothofagi	(McNabb) Singer	1983	New Zealand
	F. prunicolor	Watling	1989	Australia
	F. rodwayi	Watling	1989	Australia (Tasmania)
	F. staudtii	Henn.	1901	Cameroon
	F. venezuelae	(Singer & Digilio) Singer	1978	Venezuela
	F. violaceipora	(G.Stev.) Pegler & T.W.K.Young	1981	New Zealand
	F. viscida	(McNabb) Singer	1978	New Zealand
	F. wolfeana	Singer & J.García	1991	Mexico
