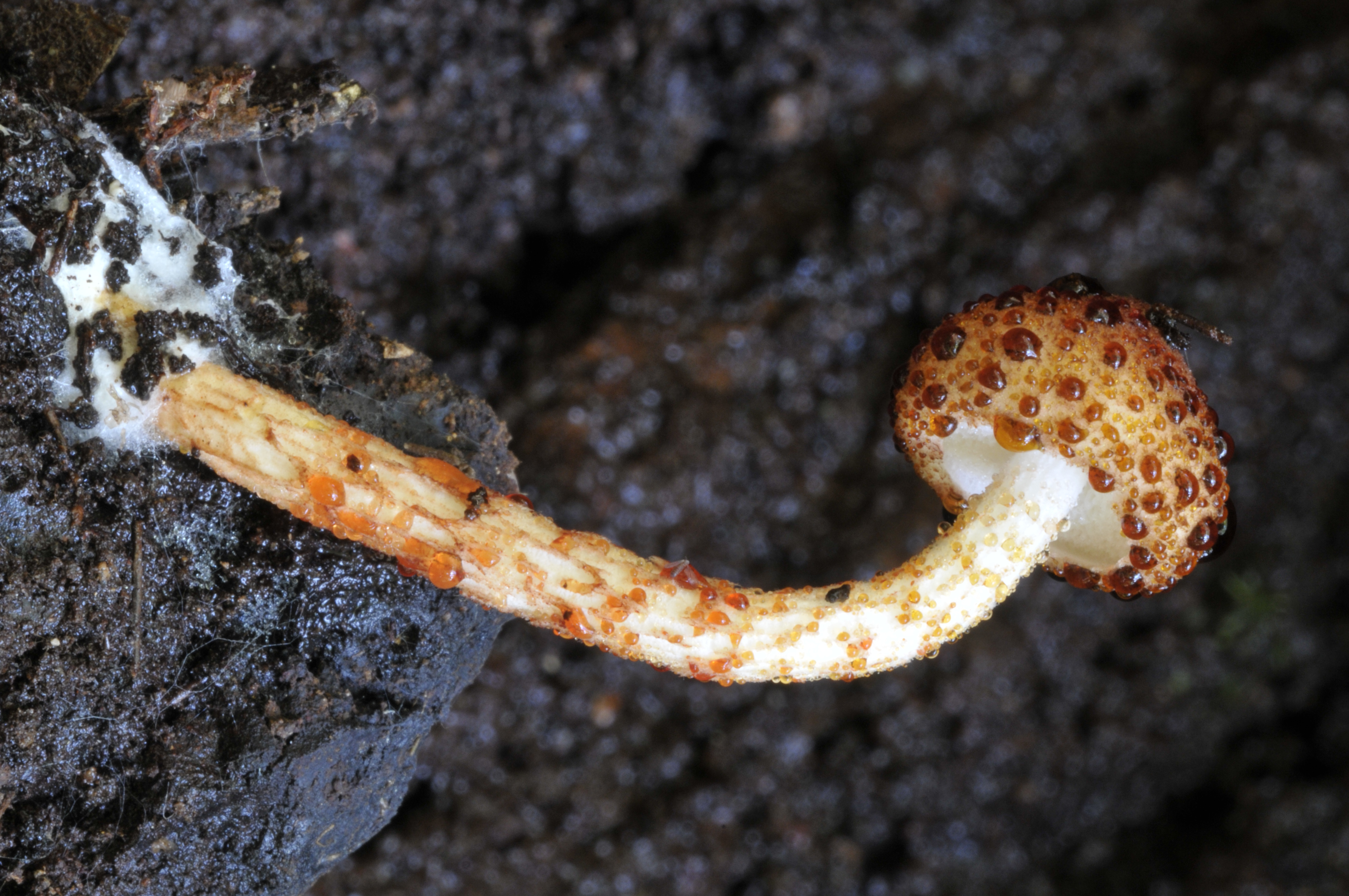

Scientific classification
- Domain: Eukaryota
- Kingdom: Fungi
- Division: Basidiomycota
- Class: Agaricomycetes
- Order: Boletales
- Family: Boletaceae
- Genus: Austroboletus
- Species: A. rarus

Binomial name
- Austroboletus rarus (Corner) E.Horak (1980)

Synonyms
- Boletus rarus Corner (1972)

= Austroboletus rarus =

Species of fungus

Austroboletus rarus is a species of bolete fungus in the family Boletaceae. Found in Singapore and Australia, it was described as new to science by E.J.H. Corner in 1972, who called it Boletus rarus. Corner found the type collection growing on a forest floor in Bukit Timah in December 1940. He suggested that it might be a variety of Boletus rubiicolor (now Austroboletus rubiicolor). Egon Horak transferred it to the genus Austroboletus in 1980.

== Description ==
The convex cap is dry and measures up to 1.3 cm (0.5 in). The surface is somewhat tomentose, but especially so near the cap center. The pale pink pores on the underside of the cap angular and about 0.5 mm in diameter, while the tubes are up to 2.5 mm (0.1 in). The slender stipe measures 4–5 cm (1.6–2.0 in) long and 2–3 mm thick. The flesh is thick and white, measuring 2–2.5 mm thick. There is white mycelium at the base of the stipe. Its spores measure 16–21 by 8–10 μm.

The Japanese species Porphyrellus fusisporus is similar in appearance but can be distinguished by its shorter, warted spores that measure 13.5–18.5 μm.
