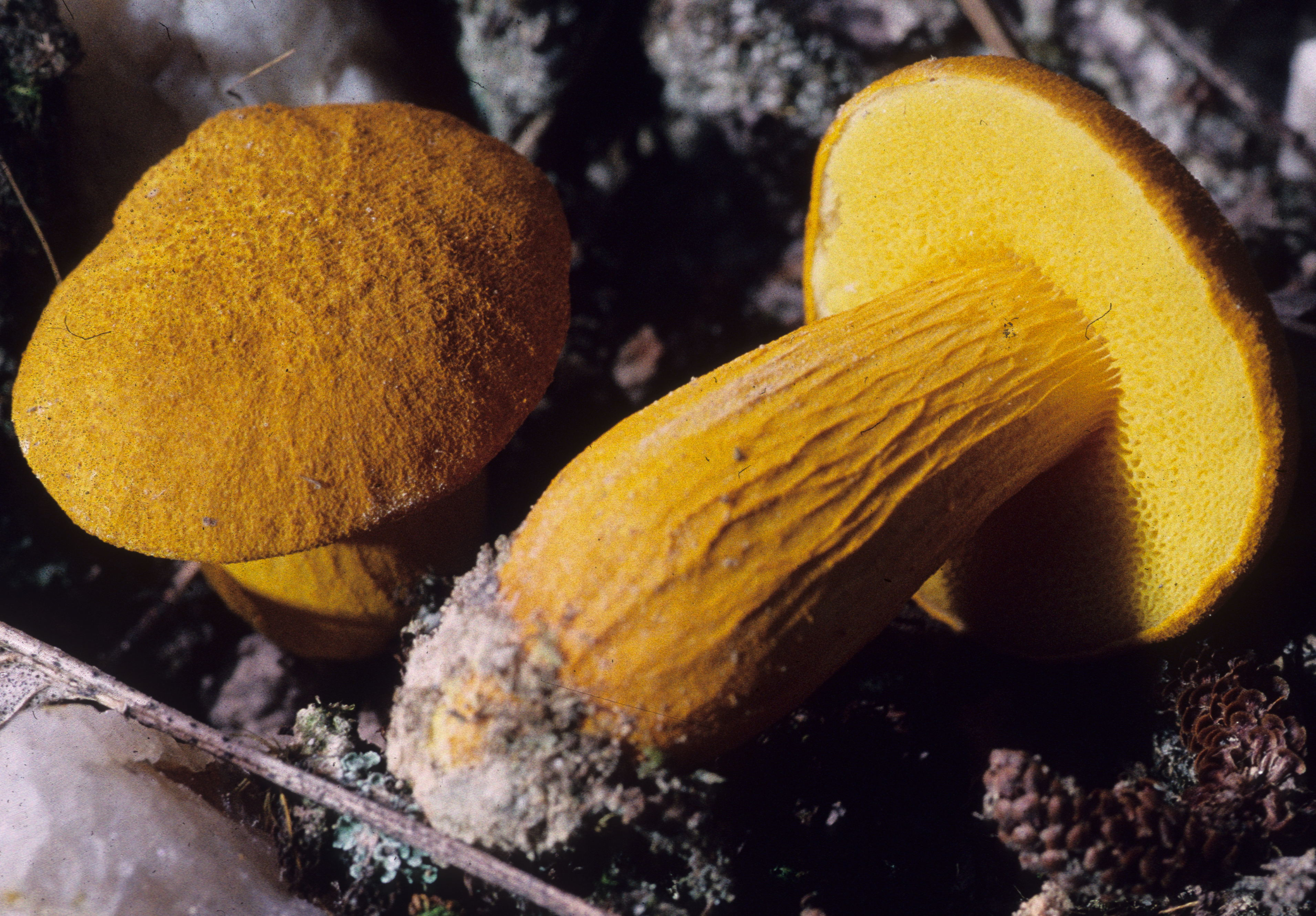

Scientific classification
- Domain: Eukaryota
- Kingdom: Fungi
- Division: Basidiomycota
- Class: Agaricomycetes
- Order: Boletales
- Family: Boletaceae
- Genus: Aureoboletus
- Species: A. auriflammeus

Binomial name
- Aureoboletus auriflammeus (Berk. & M. A. Curtis) G. Wu & Zhu L. Yang, 2016

Synonyms
- Ceriomyces auriflammeus (Berk. & M.A.Curtis) Murrill (1909); Boletus auriflammeus Berk. & M.A.Curtis (1872)

= Aureoboletus auriflammeus =

Species of fungus

Aureoboletus auriflammeus, commonly known as the flaming gold bolete, is a species of bolete fungus in the family Boletaceae. Described as new to science in 1872, it is found in eastern North America, where it grows in a mycorrhizal association with oaks. The caps of the fruit bodies are golden orange, with a yellow pore surface on the underside, and a reticulated (network-like) stem. The edibility of the mushroom is not known.

== Taxonomy ==
The species was first described scientifically by English mycologist Miles Joseph Berkeley in 1872, based on specimens collected in North Carolina and sent to him by Moses Ashley Curtis. Berkeley and Curtis named it Boletus auriflammeus. Berkeley called it "a lovely species", and thought it to be related to two other boletes he described in the same publication: Boletus hemichrysus and Boletus ravenelii. It was later transferred to Ceriomyces by William Alphonso Murrill in 1909, a genus that has since been folded into Boletus. Because the fruit bodies stain the collector's hands yellow, Rolf Singer in 1947 placed the species in Pulveroboletus, despite the lack of a partial veil characteristic of that genus. Singer interpreted the powdery surface as lingering remnants of a powdery partial veil. In 2016, it was moved to Aureoboletus genus.

The specific epithet auriflammeus means "flaming gold". Similarly, its common name is "flaming gold bolete".

== Description ==
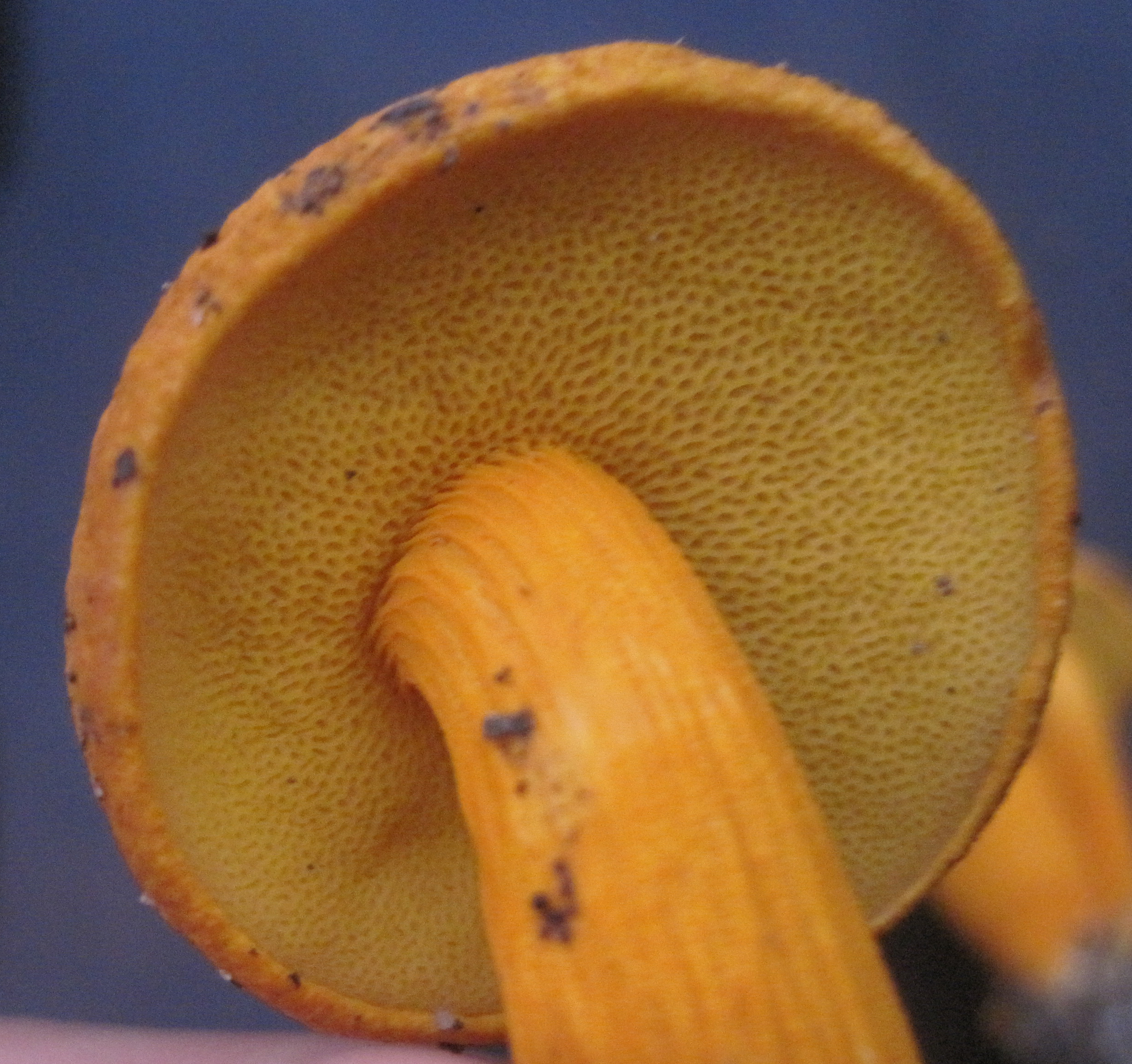
Pores and reticulations on the upper stem

The cap is initially convex before becoming broadly convex to flattened in age, and attains a diameter of 3–9.5 cm (1.2–3.7 in). The cap surface is dry, and, in young individuals, has a powdery coating that will stain hands yellow if handled. Later, the cap becomes tomentose (hairy), and sometimes develops small cracks. The cap color is bright orange-yellow, sometimes mixed with olive tints. The flesh is white to cream, and does not bruise blue when injured or exposed to air by cutting. Its odor is not distinctive, and its taste either not distinctive or acidic. The pore surface is initially yellow to yellow orange, becoming olive-yellow to greenish yellow in age, sometimes developing bright crimson to crimson-orange tints. The tube attachment to the stem is adnate to subdecurrent (running slightly down the length of the stem) and often depressed near the stem at maturity. The pores are angular, radially elongated near the stem, and typically more than 1 mm wide in maturity. Tubes are up to 1.5 cm (0.6 in) deep. The stem is 5–9 cm (2.0–3.5 in) long, 5–12 mm (0.20–0.47 in) thick, and either nearly equal in width throughout or slightly enlarged in either end. The stem surface is usually reticulate at least on the upper portion of mature specimens, although this characteristic is less pronounced or absent in young individuals. The mycelium at the base of the stem is white. The stem has neither a partial veil nor an annulus. Aureoboletus auriflammeus produces an olive-brown to ochre-brown spore print. It is not known if the fruit bodies are edible.

Spores are roughly elliptical to somewhat spindle-shaped, smooth, nearly hyaline (translucent), and measure 8–12 by 3–5 μm. The cheilocystidia (cystidia on the tube edge) are abundant, thin-walled, broadly club-shaped to sphaeropedunculate (rounded and with a short stalk). The pleurocystidia (cystidia on the tube face) are abundant, think-walled, broadly ventricose (swollen in the middle) or sometimes club-shaped. The cap cuticle is made of hyphae with bright yellow encrusted crystals in water that dissolve in potassium hydroxide to produce a diffuse lemon-yellow pigment.

=== Similar species ===
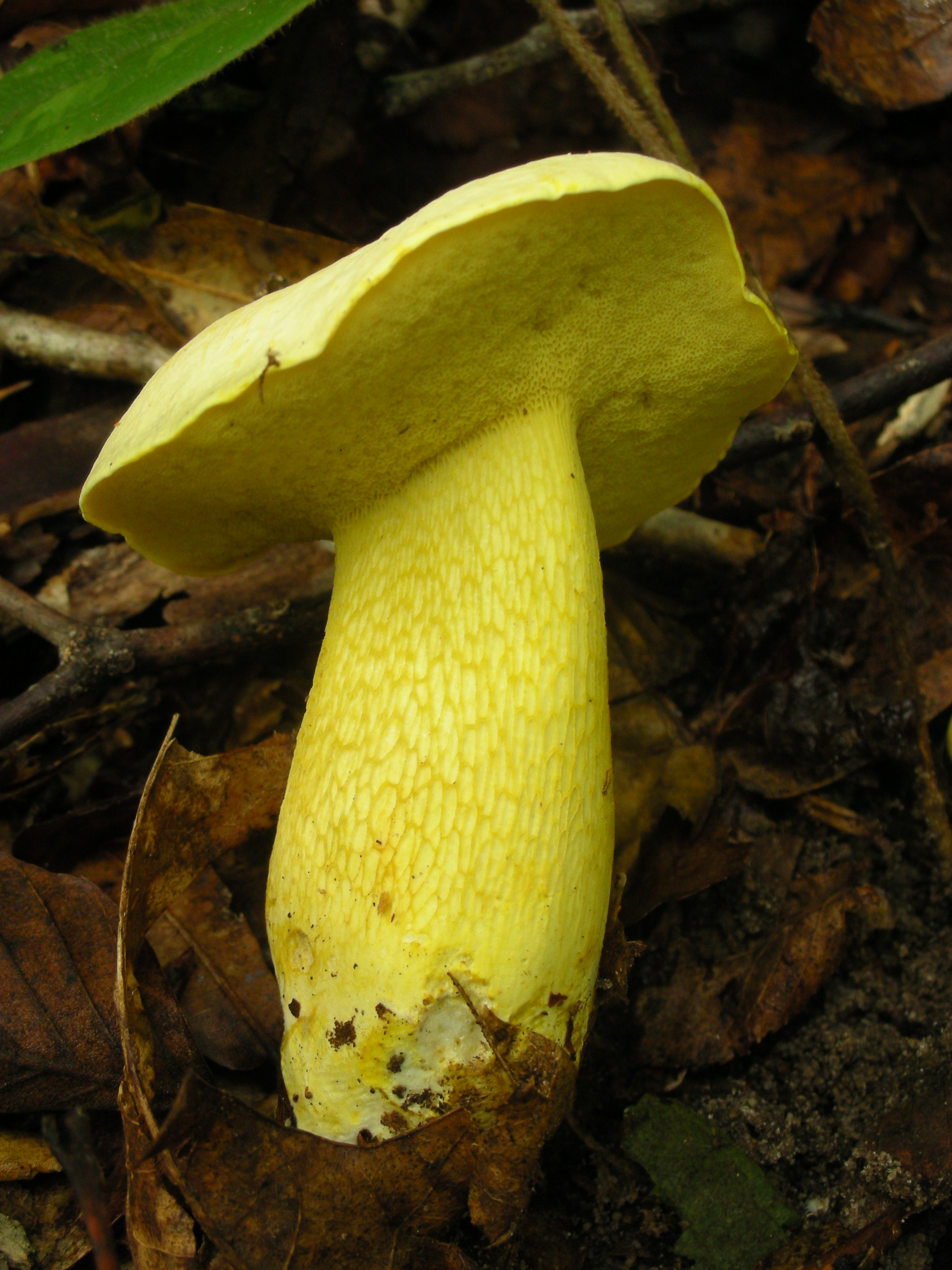
Retiboletus ornatipes

Boletus aurantiosplendens is somewhat similar in appearance to A. auriflammeus, but several features of the former species can distinguish it from the latter: an orange to brownish-orange or brownish-yellow cap; a yellow to apricot or orange stem with tawny to reddish-brown streaks that do not stain fingers when handled; yellow flesh that darkens when exposed or injured; ventricose or ventricose-rostrate (swollen in the middle with a narrow tip) cheilocystidia and pleurocystidia; and hyphae in the cap cuticle that lack bright yellow encrusted crystals. B. roxanae is another lookalike, but with less bright coloring, brownish tones on its cap, and no reticulation on the stem. Retiboletus ornatipes has a more robust stature and does not have orange tones on the stem.

== Habitat and distribution ==
The fruit bodies of Aureoboletus auriflammeus grow singly, scattered, or in groups on the ground in woods in a mycorrhizal association with oaks. The fruiting season is between July and November. An occasional species, its range covers New York south to Florida and west to Ohio and Tennessee.

== See also ==
- List of Boletus species
- List of North American boletes
