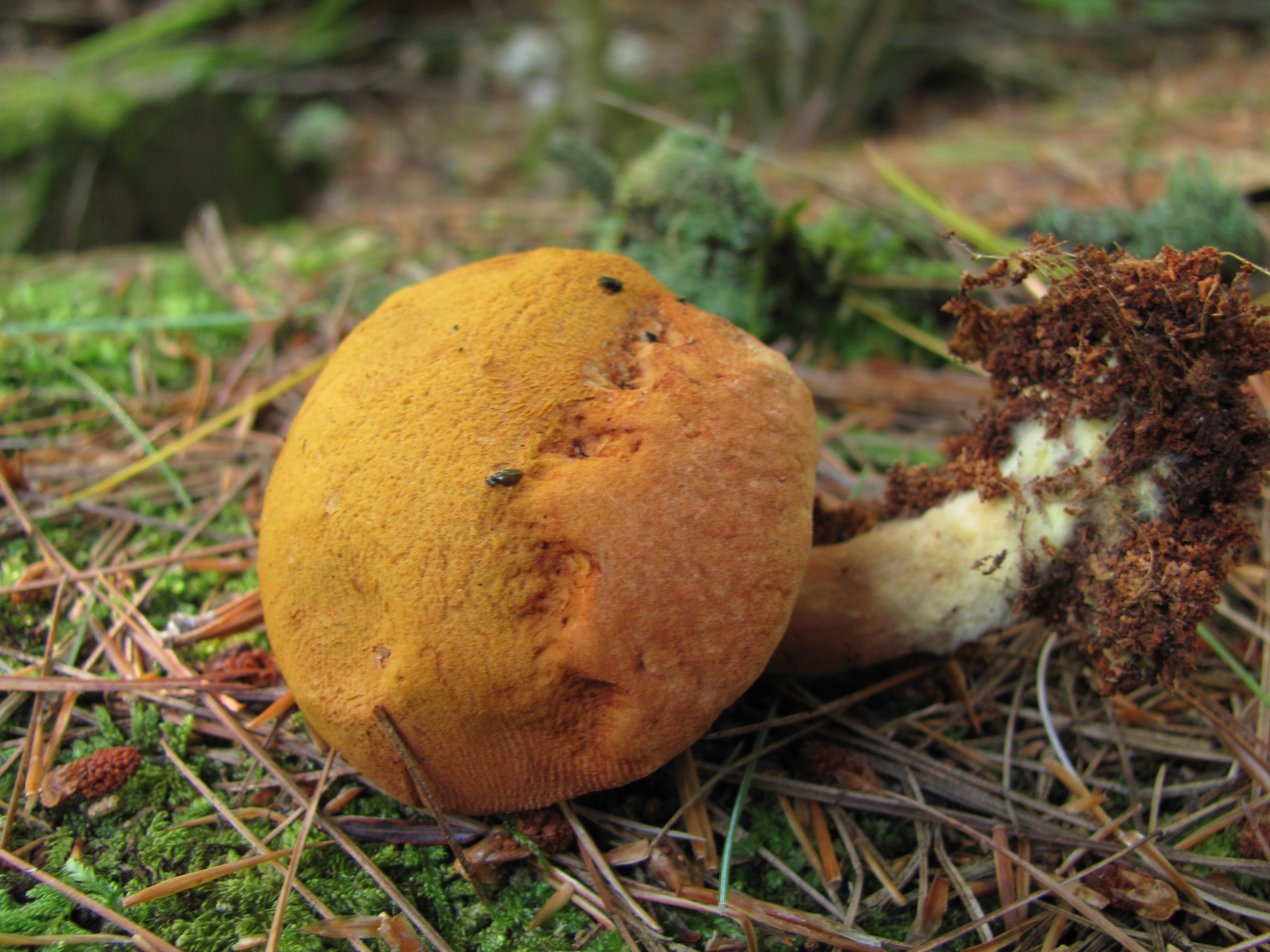
- Views of the top and underside of the cap of Buchwaldoboletus lignicola
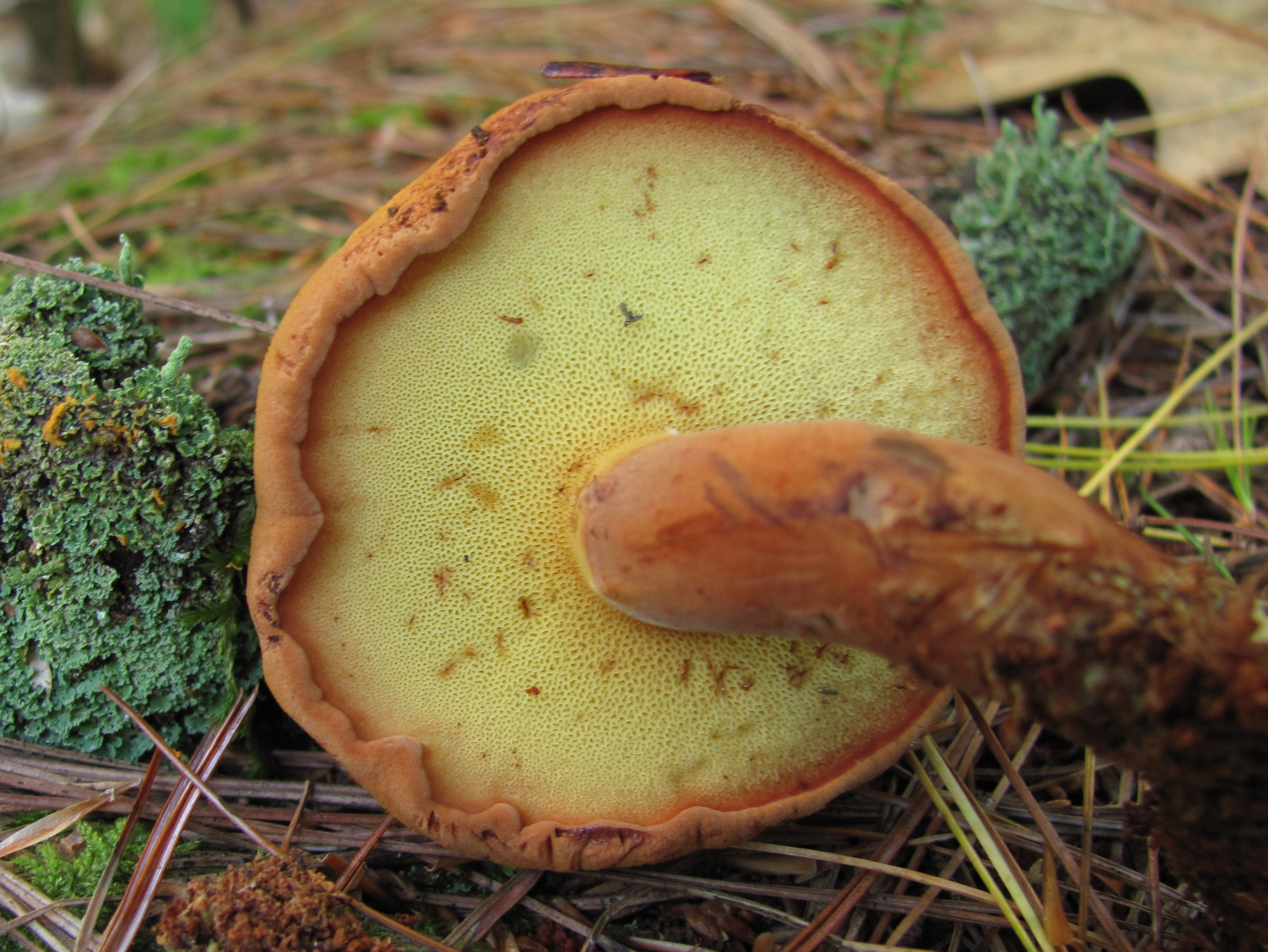

Scientific classification
- Domain: Eukaryota
- Kingdom: Fungi
- Division: Basidiomycota
- Class: Agaricomycetes
- Order: Boletales
- Family: Boletaceae
- Genus: Buchwaldoboletus
- Species: B. lignicola

Binomial name
- Buchwaldoboletus lignicola (Kallenb.) Pilát (1969)

Synonyms
- Boletus lignicola Kallenb. (1929); Xerocomus lignicola (Kallenb.) Singer (1942); Gyrodon lignicola (Kallenb.) Heinem. (1951); Phlebopus lignicola (Kallenb.) M.M.Moser ex Groves (1955); Pulveroboletus lignicola (Kallenb.) E.A.Dick & Snell (1965)

= Buchwaldoboletus lignicola =

Species of fungus

Buchwaldoboletus lignicola is a species of bolete fungus in the family Boletaceae native to Europe and North America. Found on wood, it is actually parasitic on the fungus Phaeolus schweinitzii. It has a convex yellow- to rusty brown cap, yellow to yellow-brown pores and stipe, and a brown spore print. Its edibility is unknown.

== Taxonomy and naming ==
Originally described by Franz Joseph Kallenbach in 1929 as Boletus lignicola, it was given its current name by mycologist Albert Pilát in 1969. He first placed it in the genus Pulveroboletus before erecting the new genus Buchwaldoboletus on account of its occurrence on wood (rather than in the ground), decurrent and arcuate pores, the yellow mycelium at the base of the stipe, the blueing flesh and lack of hyphal clamps. Other genera in which the species has been placed include Xerocomus by Rolf Singer in 1942, Gyrodon by Paul Heinemann in 1951, and Phlebopus by Meinhard Moser in 1955. The species name comes from the Latin words lignum "wood" and the verb cǒlěre "to inhabit".

Buchwaldoboletus lignicola is a member of the genus Buchwaldoboletus, which with the genus Chalciporus form group of fungi that is an early offshoot in the family Boletaceae. Many members appear to be parasitic.

== Description ==
The cap is convex, becoming more broadly so in age, and measures 2.5–10 cm (1.0–3.9 in) in diameter. The cap margin has a band of sterile tissue that is rolled inwards when young. The cap surface is initially finely velvety but often develops fines cracks in maturity. Its color is rusty brown to yellow brown. Easily peeled off the mushroom, the skin is separated from the yellow flesh by a thin gelatinous layer, and can in fact be moved back and forth across the cap. The flesh may stain blue where it has been cut or otherwise injured, although this reaction is slow to develop, or may not occur at all. The pores are small and angular, measuring 1–3 per millimeter, while the tubes are 3–12 mm long. The pore surface is yellowish to brownish yellow in maturity, and stains bluish-green with injury. The stipe measures 3–8 cm (1.2–3.1 in) long by 0.6–2.5 cm (0.2–1.0 in) thick, and is roughly the same width throughout its length, or narrower at the base. There is a yellow mycelium at the stipe base. The smell is mild and sweet, but has occasionally been described as foul in old specimens. The edibility of B. lignicola is not known with certainty.

The mushroom produces an olive-brown spore print. Spores are ellipsoid, smooth, and measure 6–10 by 3–4 μm.

== Distribution, habitat and ecology ==
Buchwaldoboletus lignicola has been recorded across Europe from the far northern subarctic regions south to Switzerland, and North America from Ontario and Quebec south to Pennsylvania. It is considered endangered in the Czech Republic.

It is only found where the fungus Phaeolus schweinitzii grows, and microscopic tests have revealed it is parasitic on that species. The two are found with coniferous trees such as Scots pine (Pinus sylvestris), eastern white pine (P. strobus) and European larch (Larix decidua), and less commonly deciduous trees such as wild cherry (Prunus avium).
