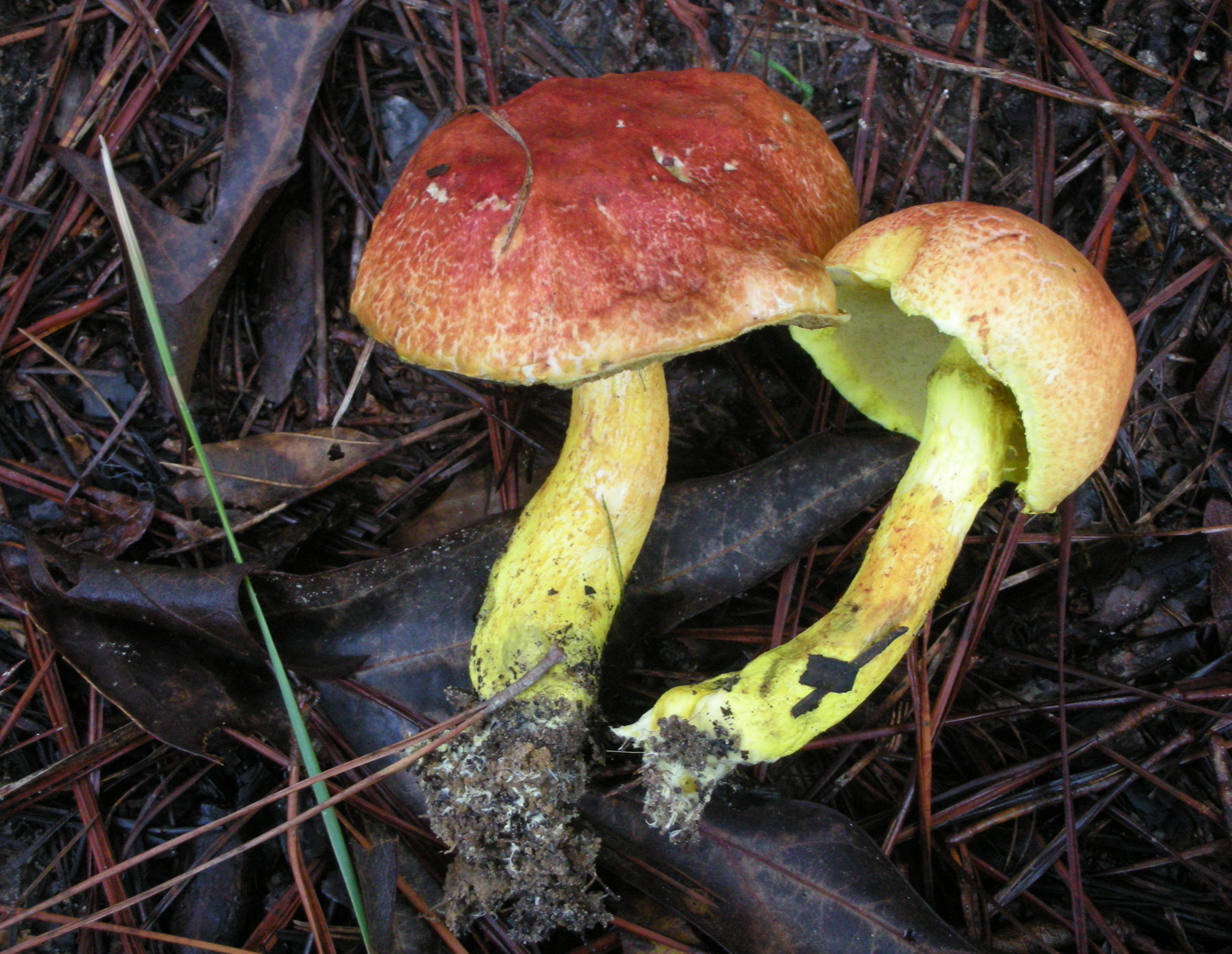
- Pulveroboletus ravenelii

Scientific classification
- Kingdom: Fungi
- Division: Basidiomycota
- Class: Agaricomycetes
- Order: Boletales
- Family: Boletaceae
- Genus: Pulveroboletus; Murrill (1909)

Type species
- Pulveroboletus ravenelii (Berk. & M.A.Curtis) Murrill (1909)

= Pulveroboletus =

Genus of fungi

Pulveroboletus is a genus of fungi in the family Boletaceae. The genus has a cosmopolitan distribution and contains 41 species.

== Taxonomy ==
The genus was first described by American mycologist William Alphonso Murrill in 1909. He defined species in the genus as having a cap and stem "clothed with a conspicuous sulphur-yellow, powdery tomentum, which may be the remains of a universal veil: context white, fleshy; tubes adnate, yellowish, covered with a large veil: spores oblong-ellipsoid, ochraceous-brown: stipe solid, annulate, not reticulate." Murrill set Pulveroboletus ravenelii as the type species.

== Species ==
The genus consists of the following species:

Image	Name	Taxon Author	Year
	Pulveroboletus aberrans	Heinem. & Gooss.-Font.	1951
	Pulveroboletus acris	Heinem.	1964
	Pulveroboletus africanus	De Kesel & Raspé	2018
	Pulveroboletus albopruinosus	Cetto	1987
	Pulveroboletus annulatus	Heinem.	1951
	Pulveroboletus atkinsonianus	(Murrill) L.D. Gómez	1997
	Pulveroboletus atrocoerulescens	Heinem.	1964
	Pulveroboletus bembae	Degreef & De Kesel	2009
	Pulveroboletus brunneopunctatus	G. Wu & Zhu L. Yang	2016
	Pulveroboletus brunneoscabrosus	Har. Takah.	2007
	Pulveroboletus caespitosus	Singer	1947
	Pulveroboletus carminiporus	Heinem.	1951
	Pulveroboletus cavipes	Heinem.	1951
	Pulveroboletus corrugatus	(Pat. & C.F. Baker) Singer	1947
	Pulveroboletus croceus	Heinem.	1951
	Pulveroboletus curtisii	(Berk.) Singer	1947
	Pulveroboletus flaviscabrosus	N.K. Zeng & Zhu L. Yang	2017
	Pulveroboletus fragicolor	(Berk.) Singer	1986
	Pulveroboletus fragrans	Raspé & Vadthanarat	2016
	Pulveroboletus frians	(Corner) Singer	1986
	Pulveroboletus icterinus	(Pat. & C.F. Baker) Watling	1990
	Pulveroboletus luteocarneus	Degreef & De Kesel	2009
	Pulveroboletus macrosporus	G. Wu & Zhu L. Yang	2016
	Pulveroboletus mazatecorum	Singer	1973
	Pulveroboletus paspali	Singer & Grinling	1967
	Pulveroboletus ravenelii	(Berk. & M.A. Curtis) Murrill	1909
	Pulveroboletus reticulopileus	M. Zang & R.H. Petersen	2001
	Pulveroboletus ridleyi	(Massee) Watling	2000
	Pulveroboletus rolfeanus	L.D. Gómez	1997
	Pulveroboletus rosaemariae	Singer	1983
	Pulveroboletus rubroscabrosus	N.K. Zeng & Zhu L. Yang	2017
	Pulveroboletus rufobadius	(Bres.) Singer	1947
	Pulveroboletus shoreae	Singer & B. Singh bis	1971
	Pulveroboletus sinapicolor	(Corner) E. Horak	2011
	Pulveroboletus sinensis	Fang Li, Ming Zhang & Kuan Zhao	2016
	Pulveroboletus sokponianus	Badou, De Kesel, Raspé & Yorou	2018
	Pulveroboletus subglobosus	(Cleland & Cheel) Singer	1967
	Pulveroboletus subrufus	N.K. Zeng & Zhu L. Yang	2017
	Pulveroboletus trinitensis	Heinem.	1954
	Pulveroboletus viridisquamosus	Watling, E. Turnbull & S.S. Lee	2007
	Pulveroboletus viscidulus	(Pat. & C.F. Baker) Singer	1947

=== Former species ===
- Pulveroboletus acaulis, moved to Buchwaldoboletus acaulis
- Pulveroboletus flaviporus, moved to Aureoboletus flaviporus
- Pulveroboletus parvulus, moved to Buchwaldoboletus parvulus
- Pulveroboletus phaeocephalus, moved to Xerocomus phaeocephalus
- Pulveroboletus viridis, moved to Boletus viridis
- Pulveroboletus xylophilus, moved to Buchwaldoboletus xylophilus
