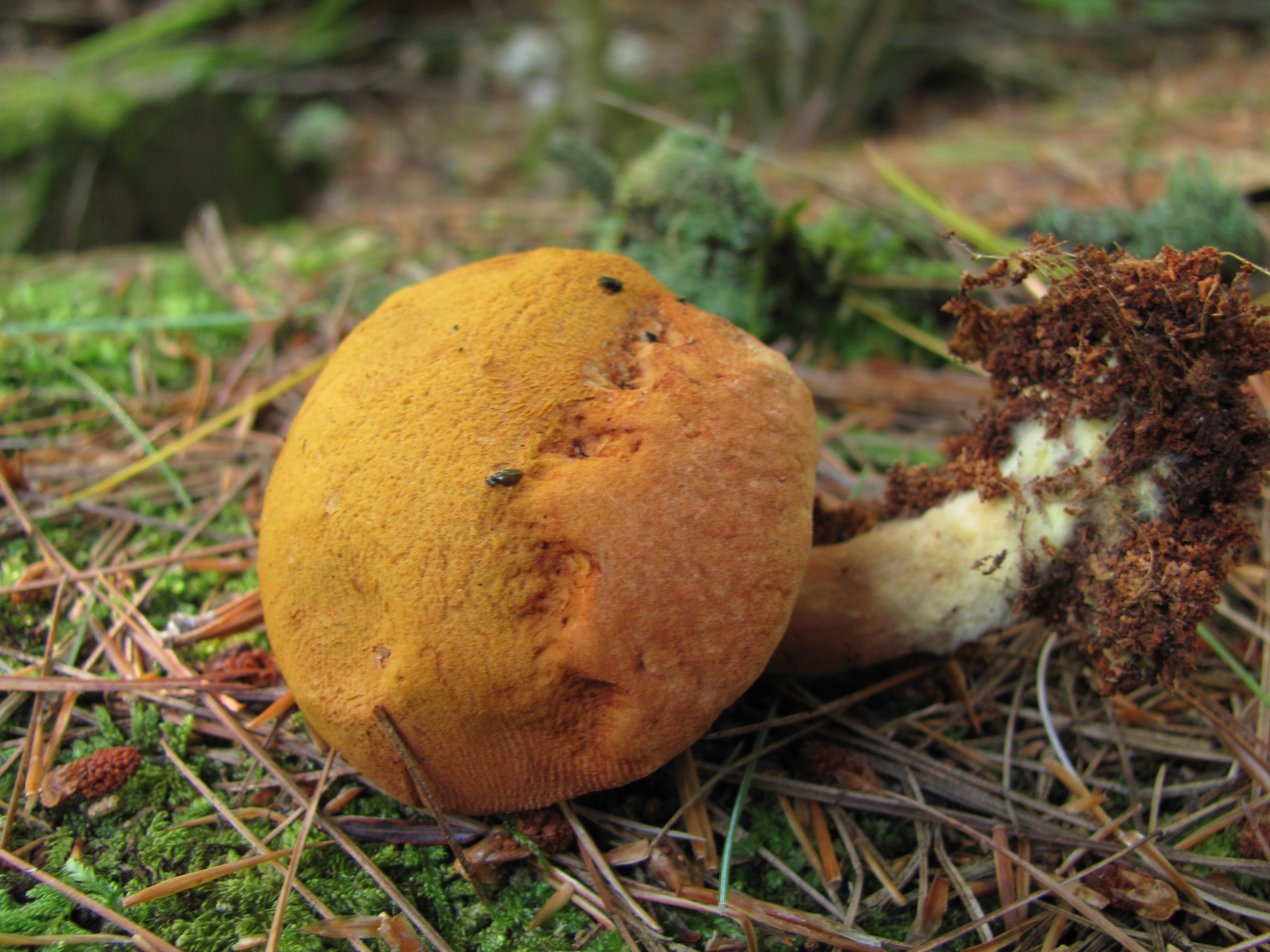
- Views of the top and underside of the cap of Buchwaldoboletus lignicola
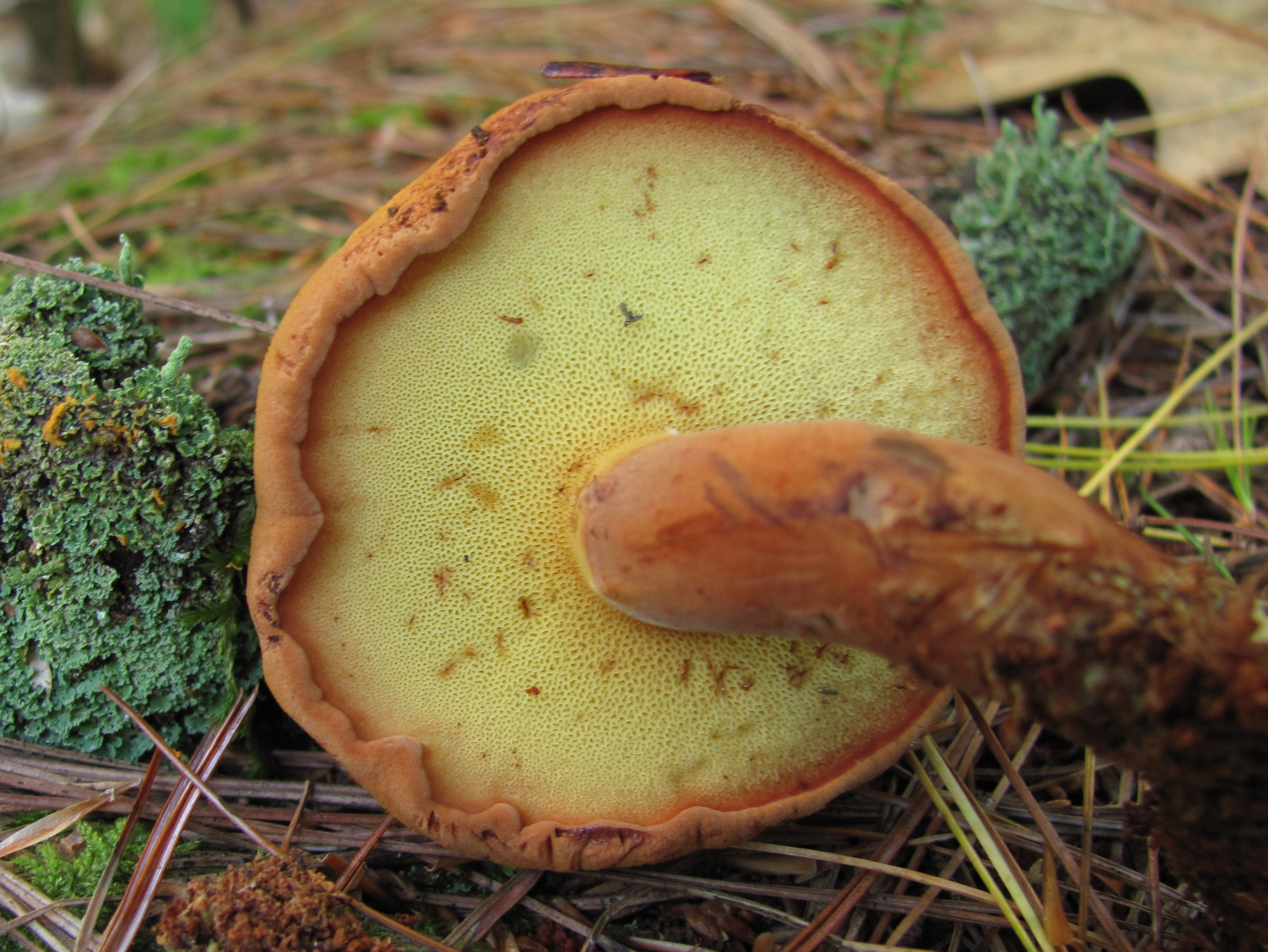

Scientific classification
- Kingdom: Fungi
- Division: Basidiomycota
- Class: Agaricomycetes
- Order: Boletales
- Family: Boletaceae
- Genus: Buchwaldoboletus; Pilát (1969)

Type species
- Buchwaldoboletus lignicola (Kallenb.) Pilát (1969)

Species
- See text

= Buchwaldoboletus =

Genus of fungi

Buchwaldoboletus is a genus of bolete fungi in the family Boletaceae. It was circumscribed by mycologist Albert Pilát in 1969. According to a 2011 survey of the genus, Buchwaldoboletus contains about a dozen species that are saprotrophic and lignicolous.

== Taxonomy ==
The genus name of Buchwaldoboletus is in honour of Niels Fabritius Buchwald (1898 - 1986), a Danish botanist and Professor of Phytopathology at a Agriculture College in Copenhagen. It was established by Albert Pilát in 1969, moving Pulveroboletus lignicola to position of the Buchwaldoboletus type species on account of its occurrence on wood (rather than in the ground), decurrent and arcuate pores, the yellow mycelium at the base of the stipe, the blueing flesh and lack of hyphal clamps. Genera Buchwaldoboletus and Chalciporus form the group of fungi that is an early offshoot in the family Boletaceae, whose many members appear to be parasitic.

=== Species ===
The genus consists of the following species:

Image	Scientific name	Taxon author	Year	Distribution
	Buchwaldoboletus acaulis	(Pegler) Both & B. Ortiz	2011 (1983)	Lesser Antilles and Martinique.
	Buchwaldoboletus brachyspermus	(Pegler) Both & B. Ortiz	2011 (1983)	Martinique.
	Buchwaldoboletus duckeanus	(Singer) Both & B. Ortiz	2011 (1983)	Brazil
	Buchwaldoboletus kivuensis	(Heinem. & Gooss.-Font.) Both & B. Ortiz	2011 (1955)	Congo
	Buchwaldoboletus lignicola	(Kallenb.) Pilát	1969 (1929)	across Europe from the far northern subarctic regions south to Switzerland, and North America from Ontario and Quebec south to Pennsylvania.
	Buchwaldoboletus parvulus	(Natarajan & Purush.) Both & B. Ortiz	2011 (1988)	India
	Buchwaldoboletus pontevedrensis	Blanco-Dios	2013	Spain
	Buchwaldoboletus pseudolignicola	(Neda) Both & B. Ortiz	2011 (1987)	Japan.
	Buchwaldoboletus spectabilis	Watling	1988	Australia
	Buchwaldoboletus xylophilus	(Petch) Both & B. Ortiz	2011 (1922)	Malaysia, Sri Lanka, Hong Kong, and Philippines
