= Buchwaldoboletus brachyspermus =

Scientific classification
- Domain: Eukaryota
- Kingdom: Fungi
- Division: Basidiomycota
- Class: Agaricomycetes
- Order: Boletales
- Family: Boletaceae
- Genus: Buchwaldoboletus
- Species: B. brachyspermus

Binomial name
- Buchwaldoboletus brachyspermus (Pegler) Both & B. Ortiz, 2011

Synonyms
- Pulveroboletus brachyspermus

Species of fungus

Buchwaldoboletus brachyspermus is a species of bolete fungus in the family Boletaceae native to Martinique.

== Taxonomy and naming ==
Originally described by David Norman Pegler as Pulveroboletus brachyspermus in 1983, it was given its current name by Ernst Both and Beatriz Ortiz-Santana in "A Preliminary Survey of the Genus Buchwaldoboletus", published in Bulletin of the Buffalo Society of Natural Sciences in 2011.

== Description ==
The cap is convex and viscid. Its color is brown. Unlike many Buchwaldoboletus species, the skin is not separated from the flesh by a thin gelatinous layer. The pores are small and angular, olivaceous yellow, bruising greenish blue. The stipe is russet-colored with a yellow floccose layer over the basal area, and there is a yellow bluing mycelium at the stipe base.

Spores are small and measure 4.7–6.2 by 3.5–4.2 μm.

== Distribution and ecology ==
Buchwaldoboletus brachyspermus has been recorded in Martinique, growing on decaying wood of dicotyledon plants in xero-mesophytic forests.
