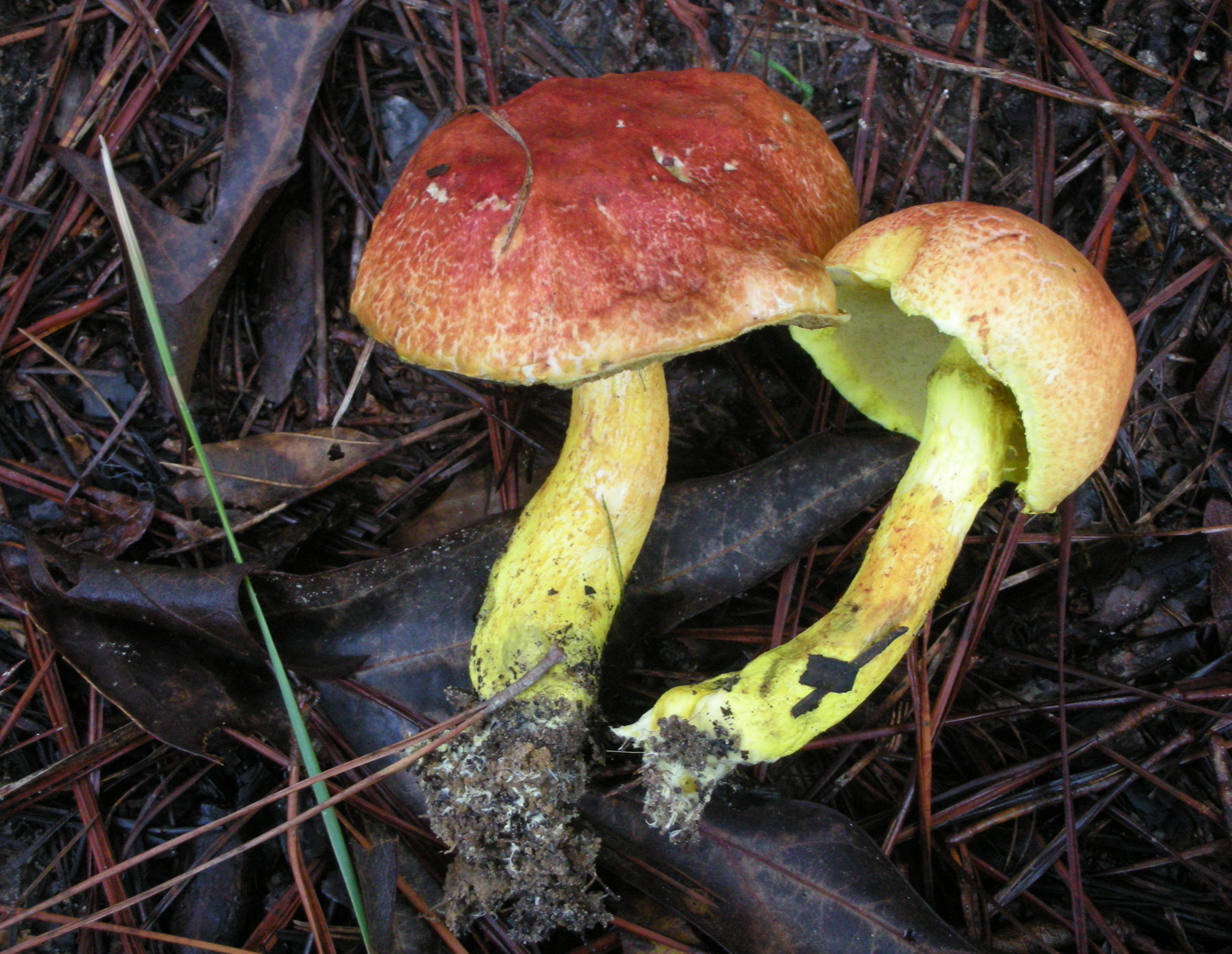

Scientific classification
- Domain: Eukaryota
- Kingdom: Fungi
- Division: Basidiomycota
- Class: Agaricomycetes
- Order: Boletales
- Family: Boletaceae
- Genus: Pulveroboletus
- Species: P. ravenelii

Binomial name
- Pulveroboletus ravenelii (Berk. & M.A.Curtis) Murrill (1909)

Synonyms
- Boletus ravenelii Berk. & M.A.Curtis (1853)

= Pulveroboletus ravenelii =

Species of fungus

Pulveroboletus ravenelii Mycological characteristics
- Pores on hymenium
- Cap is convex or flat
- Hymenium attachment is not applicable
- Stipe has a ring
- Spore print is olive-brown
- Ecology is mycorrhizal
- Edibility is edible

Pulveroboletus ravenelii, commonly known as Ravenel's bolete or the powdery sulfur bolete, is a species of bolete fungus in the family Boletaceae. It was described as new to science in 1853.

The fruit bodies (mushrooms) have convex to flat, yellowish to brownish-red caps up to 10 cm (4 in) in diameter. On the cap underside, the pore surface is bright yellow before turning dingy yellow to grayish brown with age; it stains greenish blue then grayish brown after injury. A cottony and powdery partial veil remains as a ring on the stipe.

The widely distributed species is known from Asia, Australia, and the Americas. Mycorrhizal with oak, it fruits on the ground singly, scattered, or in groups in woods. The mushrooms are edible, and have been used in traditional Chinese medicine and for mushroom dyeing.

== Taxonomy ==
The species was first described as Boletus ravenelii by Miles Joseph Berkeley and Moses Ashley Curtis in 1853. Specimens were sent to them by American botanist Henry William Ravenel, who collected them in South Carolina. They considered the bolete "a most splendid species closely allied to B. hemichrysus, and, like that, remarkable for the pulverulent veil". The specific epithet honors Ravenel. William Alphonso Murrill transferred the fungus to the genus Pulveroboletus in 1909, giving it the name by which it is known today. The mushroom is commonly known as "Ravenel's bolete" or the "powdery sulfur bolete".

== Description ==
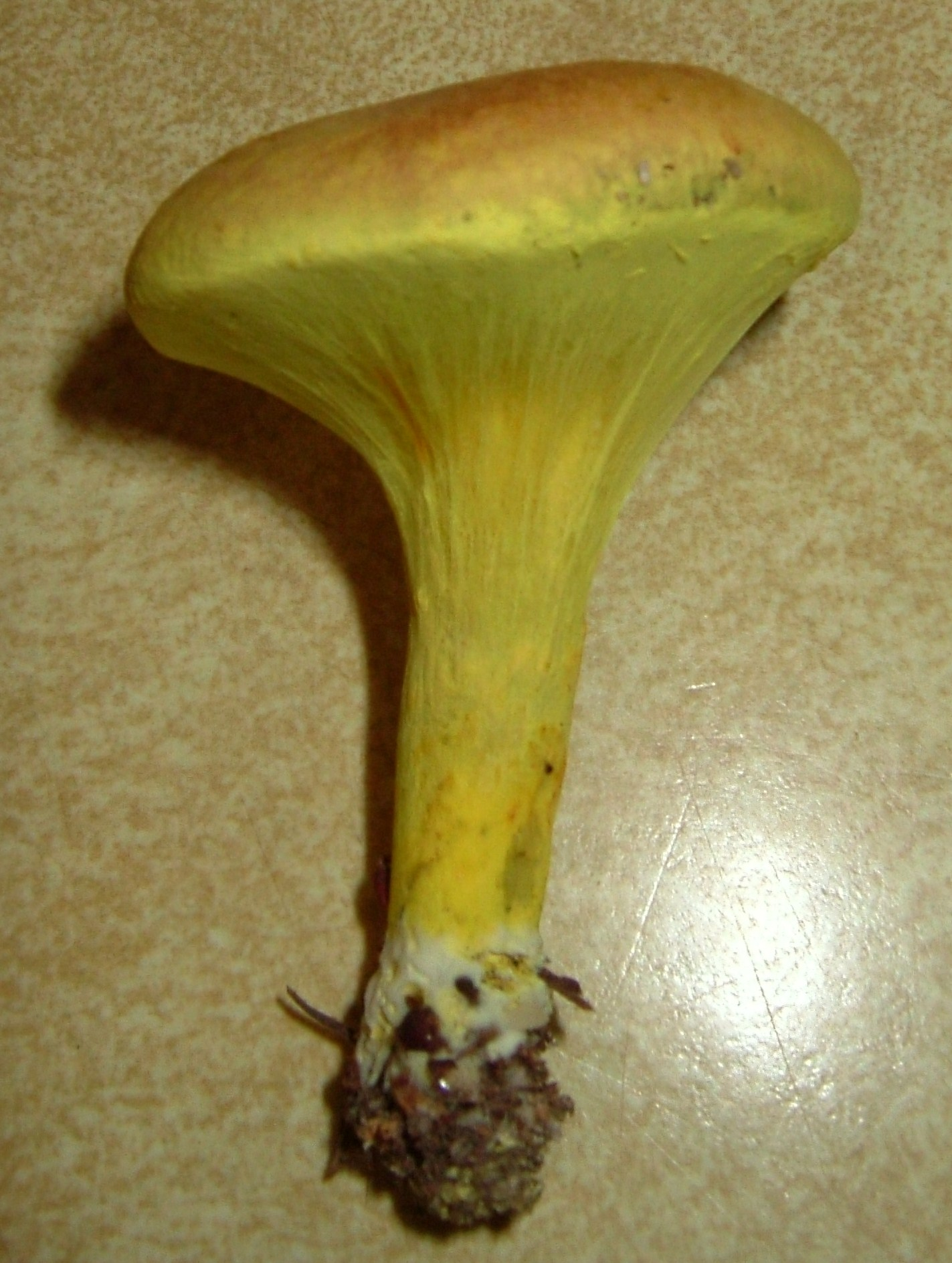
Young specimen with an intact partial veil

The cap is rounded to convex before flattening with age, and attains a diameter of 1–10 cm (1/2–4 in). Its margin is curved inward when young, and usually has hanging remnants of the partial veil. The surface is dry and initially coated with fine particles, while later it develops fine hairs or small scales that are pressed down flat on the surface; in maturity the surface usually develops fine cracks or wrinkles. It is bright yellow, later turning to orange-red to brownish red. The flesh is white to pale yellow, and, when cut, will slowly stain pale blue, then dingy yellow to pale brown. Its flesh has been described variously as indistinct, or bitter tasting with an odor of hickory leaves. The pore surface is bright yellow before turning dingy yellow to grayish brown with age. It stains greenish blue then grayish brown after being bruised or injured. The pores, which number about 1–3 per millimeter, are angular to almost circular. The tubes comprising the pore surface are 5–8 cm (2–3 1/4 in) deep.

The yellow stem measures 4.5–14.5 cm (2–5 1/2 in) long by 0.6–1.6 cm (1/4–3/4 in) thick, and can be roughly equal in width throughout, or either tapered or thicker near the base. It is solid (i.e., not hollow), and, above the level of the base, the surface is covered with minute hairs pressed flat against the surface. The partial veil, also bright yellow, is cottony and powdery, and remains as a ring on the upper portion of the stem, although in some specimens it merges gradually with the stipe surface and becomes inconspicuous. There is white mycelium at the stipe base.

Pulveroboletus ravenelii produces an olive-grey to olive-brown spore print. The spores are elliptical to oval, smooth, and measure 8–10 by 4–5 μm. The hyphal tissue in the hymenophore is inamyloid and bilateral, meaning it diverges downward from the flesh toward the edge of the hymenophore, away from a central strand. The tubes have scattered cystidia on the walls (pleurocystidia) and abundant cystidia on the edges (cheilocystidia). The hyphae in the cap cuticle are arranged as an ixotrichodermium–long and typically multi-celled, with erect hyphae embedded in a gelatinous matrix. Clamp connections are absent from the hyphae.

== Habitat and distribution ==
The fruit bodies grow on the ground singly, scattered, or in groups in woods under conifers. Preferred mycorrhizal plant hosts include pine, hemlock, and rhododendron. Fruiting occurs from July to October, later on the North American West Coast. On that continent, it is distributed from eastern Canada extending south to the Gulf of Mexico, and west to Texas, Michigan, and California. The bolete was reported from a Mexican beech (Fagus mexicana) forest in Hidalgo, Mexico, in 2010. It has also been recorded from Costa Rica and Colombia. In Asia, it has been found in Indonesia and China. It has also been recorded from northeast Australia.

== Uses ==
The mushrooms are edible. They have been used in traditional Chinese medicine to treat lumbago, numbed limbs, and as an antihemorrhagic. Bioactive compounds that have been identified from the fruit bodies include pulveravin A, pulveravin B, vulpinic acid, and pulverolide. Mushrooms are also used in mushroom dyeing to produce the colors yellow, gold, greenish yellow, orange, or olive, depending on the mordant used.

== See also ==
- List of North American boletes
