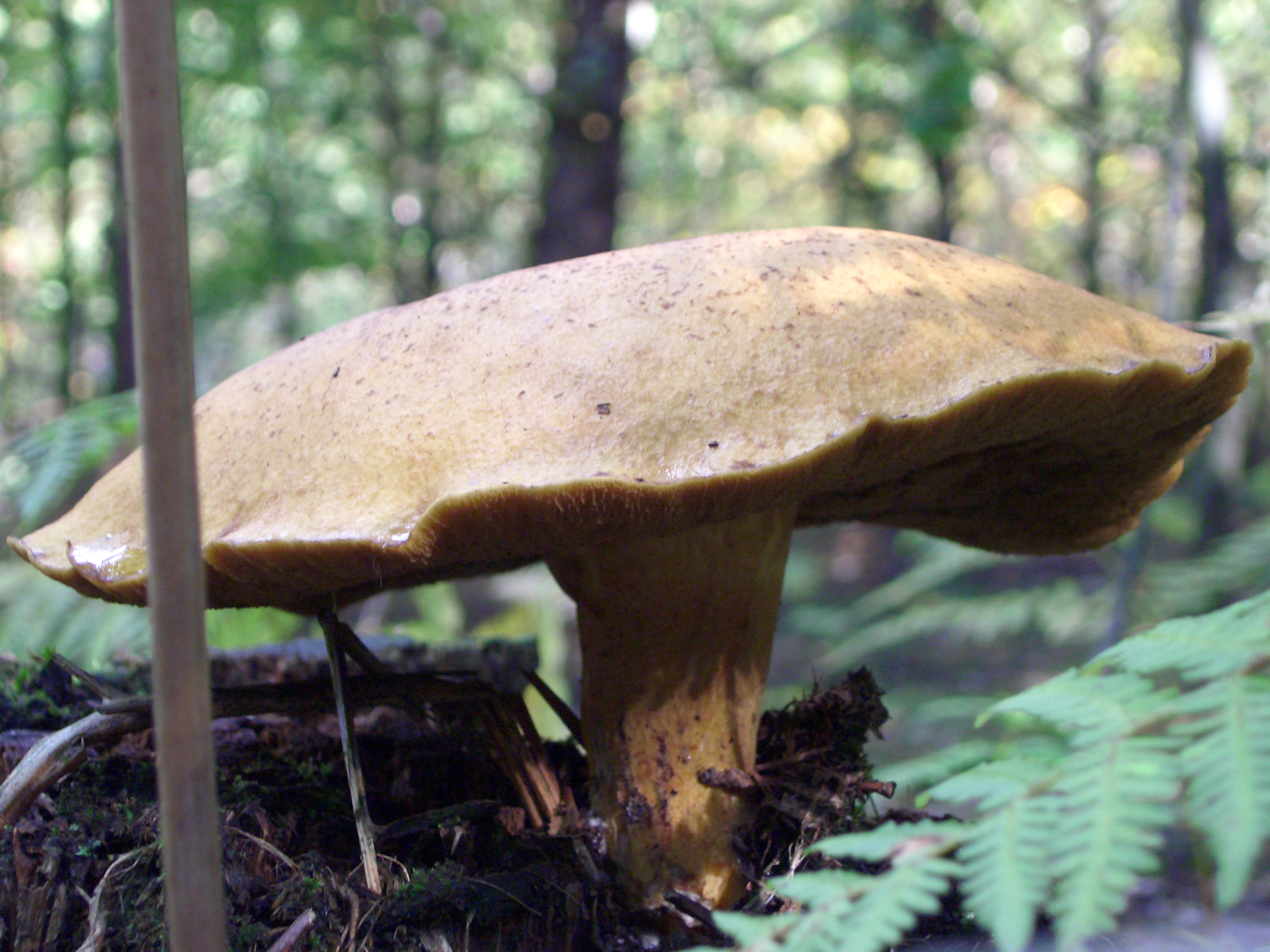

Scientific classification
- Kingdom: Fungi
- Division: Basidiomycota
- Class: Agaricomycetes
- Order: Boletales
- Family: Boletaceae
- Genus: Buchwaldoboletus
- Species: B. hemichrysus

Binomial name
- Buchwaldoboletus hemichrysus (Berk. & M.A. Curtis) Pilát

Synonyms
- Boletus hemichrysus

= Buchwaldoboletus hemichrysus =

Species of fungus

Buchwaldoboletus hemichrysus is a species of bolete fungus in the family Boletaceae native to USA. Found on pine wood, it has a convex bright golden-yellow cap, rich red-brown pores, and an ochraceous spore print. It's edible, but the flesh is described as "tasteless".

== Taxonomy and naming ==
Originally described by Miles Joseph Berkeley and Moses Ashley Curtis in 1873 as Boletus hemichrysus, it was given its current name by mycologist Albert Pilát in 1969. He placed it in the new genus Buchwaldoboletus on account of its occurrence on wood (rather than in the ground), decurrent and arcuate pores, the yellow mycelium at the base of the stipe, the blueing flesh and lack of hyphal clamps.

== Description ==
The cap is bright golden yellow, convex, and can reach 6–8 inches (150–200 mm) in diameter. The flesh may stain blue where it has been cut or bruised. The pores are small, and the pore surface is red-brown in maturity, staining bluish with injury. The stipe is irregular, varying in thickness, sometimes 1 1/2 inches (38 mm) in diameter, yellowish tinted with red. There is a yellow mycelium at the stipe base.

The mushroom produces an ochraceous spore print. Spores measure 7–9.5 × 3–3.5 μm.
