= Pulveroboletus bembae =

Scientific classification
- Kingdom: Fungi
- Division: Basidiomycota
- Class: Agaricomycetes
- Order: Boletales
- Family: Boletaceae
- Genus: Pulveroboletus
- Species: P. bembae

Binomial name
- Pulveroboletus bembae Degreef & De Kesel (2009)
- The known range of P. bembae is limited to northern Gabon, Africa

Species of fungus

Pulveroboletus bembae
- Mycological characteristics
- Pores on hymenium
- Cap is convex
- Hymenium is adnate
- Stipe has a ring
- Ecology is mycorrhizal

Pulveroboletus bembae is a species of fungus in the family Boletaceae that was first described in 2009. It is known only from the rainforest of northern Gabon, a region known for its high level of species diversity. Like all boletes, P. bembae has fleshy fruit bodies that form spores in tubes perpendicular to the ground on the underside of the cap. These yellowish tubes form a surface of pores, each about 1–2 mm in diameter. The brownish caps may reach up to 3.5 cm (1.4 in) wide, and rest atop pale brown stems up to 5.5 cm (2.2 in) long. The stems have a woolly, whitish yellow ring of tissue that is short-lived, and may be absent in older specimens. The spores of P. bembae are spindle- or fuse-shaped, and have rough surfaces—a detail observable when viewed with scanning electron microscopy. The fungus grows in a mycorrhizal relationship with Gilbertiodendron dewevrei, the dominant tree species of the Guineo-Congolian rainforest. Other similar Pulveroboletus species in the area include P. annulus and P. croceus, which may be differentiated from P. bembae by a combination of macro- and microscopic characteristics.

== Discovery and classification ==
The specimens of Pulveroboletus bembae upon which the species description is based were collected in April 2008 from three locations in Gabon: in Ogooue-Ivindo Province at the Ipassa-Makokou Research Station; in the Minkébé National Park near Minvoul, and in Bitouga, both locations in the northerly province of Woleu-Ntem. Until the report of this species and the related Pulveroboletus luteocarneus, 12 species of Pulveroboletus had been reported in tropical Africa. According to Degreef & De Kesel, who described the species in a 2009 publication, P. bembae belongs to the section Pulveroboletus of the genus Pulveroboletus. This section, defined by Singer in 1947, is characterized by the presence of a pulverulent-arachnoid veil (covered with fine, powdery wax granules and cobwebby) and fruit bodies that are sulphur-yellow, greenish, or yellowish-brown in color.

The specific epithet is derived from the word bemba, a name used by the Baka people for the tree Gilbertiodendron dewevrei that is associated with the fungus.

== Description ==
The cap is initially convex—sometimes with a small rounded elevation in the center—and flattens out in maturity. It reaches 30–35 mm (1.2–1.4 in) in diameter, and the color is almost uniformly rust-brown to reddish brown, although young specimens have a slightly paler margin (edge). The cap surface is dry and dull, but develops a sheen with age. In older specimens, the texture of the margins is described as rimulose—a condition in which a surface is cracked, but the cracks do not intersect one another to form a network and mark out areas. The cap cuticle extends slightly over the edge of the cap and curves downward, and is partly covered with remnants of the universal veil. The flesh at the center of the cap is less than about 5 mm (0.20 in) thick, and gradually becomes very thin towards the margin. It is cream-colored to pale yellow with pale reddish-brown to light brown shades under the cuticle and down the stem.

The yellowish tubes on the underside of the cap are slightly swollen on one side, slightly depressed around the area of attachment to the stem. They are fused to the stem, in an adnate attachment; rarely, some tubes will have a decurrent "tooth" (tissue that runs slightly down the length of the stem) that is less than 5 mm (0.20 in) long. The pores formed by the tube ends are angular to round, and are more elongated near the stem. Their diameters are typically less than 1–2 mm in diameter, and are they are the same color as the tubes, or slightly greener. The stem is 37–55 mm (1.5–2.2 in) by 4–5 mm (0.16–0.20 in) thick, cylindrical, with a narrow base measuring 2–4 mm, and sometimes attached to yellow mycelia. It is solid, but as it ages it becomes stuffed (as if filled with cotton) and eventually almost completely hollow. The stem surface is dull, dry, pale brown, and entirely covered with tiny brown to reddish brown squamules (small scales). The flesh of the stem is cream-colored, streaked with pale reddish brown to light brown from the upper third towards the base, while the base is light brown. The ring is located on either the stem or the margin of the cap. This woolly, whitish yellow ring of tissue is fragile and short-lived, and has usually weathered away in older specimens. The odor of the mushroom is described as "mildly fungoid to earthy", and the taste "mildly fungoid".

=== Microscopic characteristics ===
The color of the spore print is unknown. The spores are somewhat spindle-shaped, boletoid (long, lean, and fuse-shaped), with a pronounced suprahilar depression (a surface indentation formed where the spore was attached to the spore-bearing cells, the basidia), and typically measure 9.3–11.3 by 3.9–4.7 μm. They are weakly pigmented, and their rough surfaces can be seen under scanning electron microscopy. The spores are inamyloid, meaning they will not absorb iodine stain from Melzer's reagent. The basidia are 26.9–39.3 by 9.0–12.0 μm, cylindrical to narrowly club-shaped, hyaline (translucent), and have four sterigmata (extensions that attach the spores). The pleurocystidia (cystidia on the gill face) are 57.4–92.6 by 9.4–17.4 μm, spindle-shaped, moderately frequent, and extend beyond the surface of the hymenium. They have thin, hyaline walls, and are colored the same as the hymenium, without any crystals or encrustations. The cheilocystidia (cystidia on the gill edge), which measure 50.6–75.1 by 12.2–16.1 μm, are more abundant than the cheilocystidia, but otherwise share the same characteristics. The cap cuticle is made of a thin physalo-palisadoderm—a type of tissue where the ends of the hyphae reach the same length and form a palisade of cells; these short anticlinal hyphae are 20–40 by 5–8 μm, and support one or two inflated, brownish, spherical to spheropedunculate (somewhat spherical with a stem) terminal elements that are 25–45 μm wide, non-amyloid, thin-walled, and do not have any encrustations. The cuticle of the stem is made of smooth parallel hyphae. The squamules on the cap surface have a physalo-palisadodermic arrangement made of short anticlinal hyphae that support elongated inflated elements of 15–30 by 10–15 μm and some scattered basidia. The flesh is made of hyaline, thin-walled hyphae, measuring 10–15 μm wide, and organized in a parallel fashion. These hyphae do not have an associated mediostratum—a central strand of parallel hyphae from which other hyphae diverge sideways. Clamp connections are absent in the hyphae of P. bembae.

=== Similar species ===
Although the fruit bodies of P. bembae are roughly similar to those in Xerocomus, species in this genus do not have the powdery veil characteristic of P. bembae. Two similar species in the same area include P. annulus and P. croceus, described in 1951 by Belgian mycologist Paul Heinemann, based on specimens collected in the Congo. Although the identity of these two species is not fully clarified because of insufficient collections, P. bembae differs from both in its larger cystidia, its cream-colored flesh with pale reddish-brown to light brown tones under the cap cuticle (compared to white in P. annulus and P. croceus), its yellow mycelium (white in P. annulus and P. croceus), and differences in ecology.

== Habitat and distribution ==
Collections have been made in Ogooue-Ivindo (left) and Woleu-Ntem (right) provinces

The species has been found growing in small groups in the Guineo-Congolian rainforest. This forest is dominated by the single canopy tree species Gilbertiodendron dewevrei. Not only does this tree provide food in the form of edible seeds for a wide variety of large mammals, it forms mycorrhizal relationships with P. bembae. This is a mutually beneficial relationship where the hyphae of the fungus grow around the roots of the plant, enabling the fungus to receive moisture, protection and nutritive byproducts of the tree, and affording the tree greater access to soil nutrients. The ectomycorrhizal symbiosis is thought to contribute to the success of the dominant species, by allowing it access to nutrients otherwise unavailable. The Congolian forests encompass an ecoregion known for its species richness and endemism, which is spread across four countries: Cameroon, Gabon, Republic of Congo, and the Central African Republic.
