= Buchwaldoboletus duckeanus =

Scientific classification
- Domain: Eukaryota
- Kingdom: Fungi
- Division: Basidiomycota
- Class: Agaricomycetes
- Order: Boletales
- Family: Boletaceae
- Genus: Buchwaldoboletus
- Species: B. duckeanus

Binomial name
- Buchwaldoboletus duckeanus (Singer) Both & B. Ortiz

Synonyms
- Pulveroboletus duckeanus

Species of fungus

Buchwaldoboletus duckeanus is a species of bolete fungus in the family Boletaceae native to South America.

== Taxonomy and naming ==
Originally described by Rolf Singer in 1983 as Pulveroboletus duckeanus, it was given its current name by Ernst Both and Beatriz Ortiz-Santana in A preliminary survey of the genus Buchwaldoboletus, published in "Bulletin of the Buffalo Society of Natural Sciences" in 2011.

== Description ==
The cap is convex and viscid. Its color is brown. Easily peeled off the mushroom, the skin is separated from the flesh by a thin gelatinous layer. The pores are small and angular, and the pore surface stains blue with injury. The stipe is subferruginous and tapering, and there is a yellow bluing mycelium at the stipe base.

Spores are small and measure (4)5–6 by (3.3)3.5–4.2(4.5) μm.

== Distribution and ecology ==
Buchwaldoboletus duckeanus has been recorded in Brazil, in Adolfo Ducke Forest Reserve. Like other Buchwaldoboletus species, it is not obligatorily ectomycorrhizal.
