= Buchwaldoboletus kivuensis =

Scientific classification
- Domain: Eukaryota
- Kingdom: Fungi
- Division: Basidiomycota
- Class: Agaricomycetes
- Order: Boletales
- Family: Boletaceae
- Genus: Buchwaldoboletus
- Species: B. kivuensis

Binomial name
- Buchwaldoboletus kivuensis (Heinem. & Gooss.-Font.) Both & B. Ortiz, 2011

Species of fungus

Buchwaldoboletus kivuensis is a species of bolete fungus in the family Boletaceae native to Africa.

== Taxonomy and naming ==
Originally described by Paul Heinemann in 1951 as Gyrodon lignicola, it was given its current name by Ernst Both and Beatriz Ortiz-Santana in A preliminary survey of the genus Buchwaldoboletus, published in "Bulletin of the Buffalo Society of Natural Sciences" in 2011.

== Description ==
The cap is convex, tomentose-pulverulent and dry. Its color is cinnamon-brown. Easily peeled off the mushroom, the skin is separated from the flesh by a thin gelatinous layer. The pores are small and angular, ochraceous-decurrent, and the pore surface stains blue with injury. The stipe is cylindrical and eccentric, and there is a yellow mycelium at the stipe base.

Spores measure 5.3–6.8 by 3.3–4.7 μm.

== Distribution ==
Buchwaldoboletus kivuensis has been recorded in Congo, in the region of lakes Edward and Kivu, at altitude 1650 m. It grows on soil covered with dry branches and on Coffea arabica and Eucalyptus plantations.
