= Pulveroboletus sinensis =

Scientific classification
- Kingdom: Fungi
- Division: Basidiomycota
- Class: Agaricomycetes
- Order: Boletales
- Family: Boletaceae
- Genus: Pulveroboletus
- Species: P. sinensis

Binomial name
- Pulveroboletus sinensis Fang Li, Ming Zhang & Kuan Zhao

Species of fungi

Pulveroboletus sinensis is a species of blue staining bolete fungus of the family Boletaceae and the genus Pulveroboletus found in the Guangdong Province in China. It is characterized by its yellow to vivid-yellow pulverulent cap which can darken to a deep orange at the center, and is covered with deep-orange to brown-orange conico-pyramidal scales. The cap is cyanescent when cut or bruised, while the stem does not stain. These scales distinguish P. sinensis from a closely related species Pulveroboletus brunneopunctatus.

Singular fruiting bodies form from July to October on soil, underneath conifers mixed with broadleaf trees at altitudes of 180–600 m (590–1,970 ft). Currently this species has only been identified in Heishiding, Guangdong Province.
