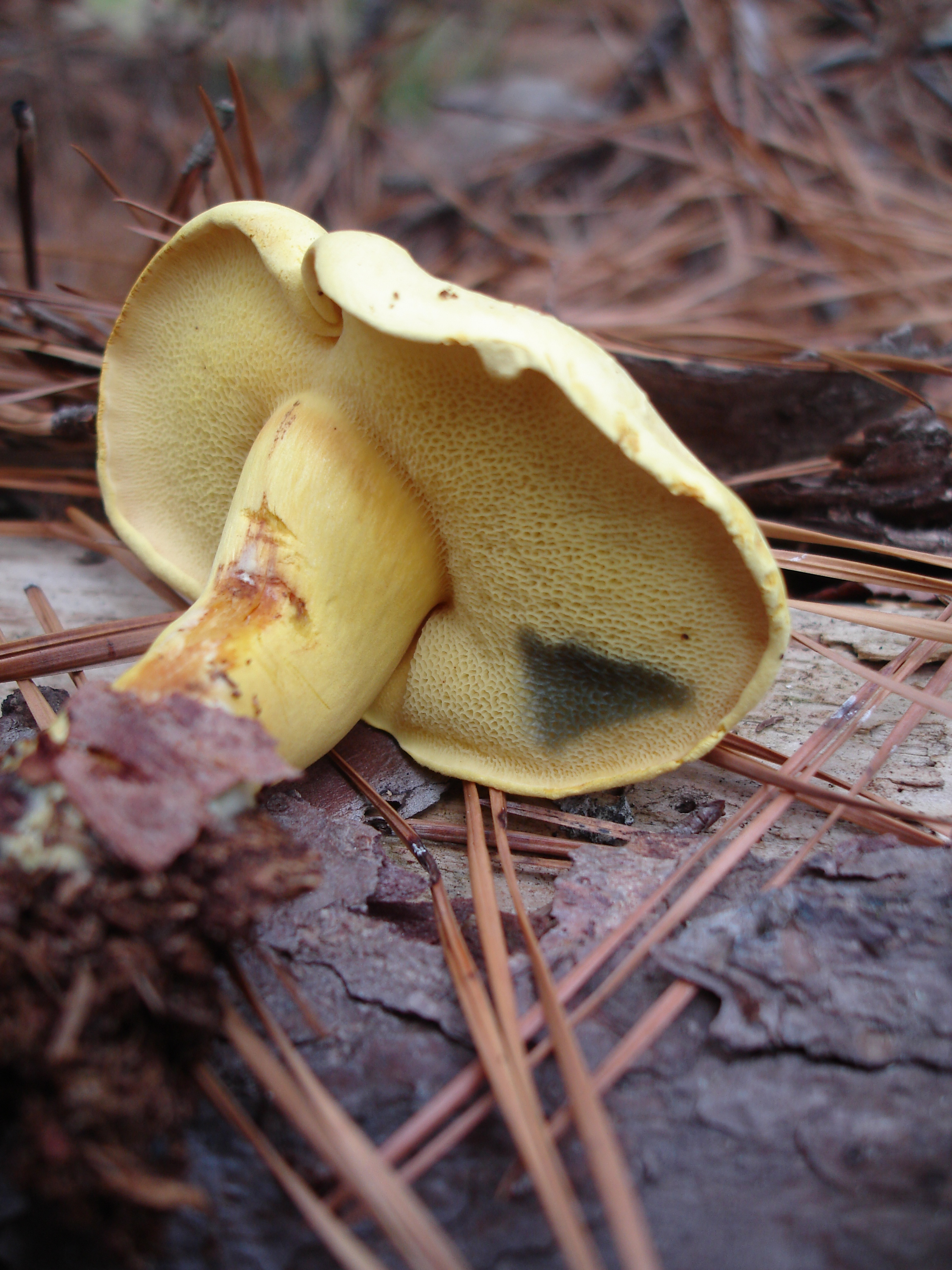

Scientific classification
- Kingdom: Fungi
- Division: Basidiomycota
- Class: Agaricomycetes
- Order: Boletales
- Family: Boletaceae
- Genus: Buchwaldoboletus
- Species: B. pseudolignicola

Binomial name
- Buchwaldoboletus pseudolignicola (Neda) Both & B. Ortiz (2011)

Synonyms
- Gyrodon pseudolignicola (Neda) Har. Takah.; Pulveroboletus pseudolignicola Neda

= Buchwaldoboletus pseudolignicola =

Species of fungus

Buchwaldoboletus pseudolignicola is a species of bolete fungus in the family Boletaceae native to Japan.

== Taxonomy and naming ==
Originally described as Pulveroboletus pseudolignicola in 1987, it was reclassified to the genus Buchwaldoboletus in 2011.

== Description ==
The cap is 4–17 cm, pulvinate to plane, velutinous, silky and tomentose, viscid when wet. Its color is yellow to cinnamon-brown. The pores are small and chrome yellow, tubes arcuate-decurrent; Yellow, and context yellow, bruising when bruised. The stipe is 5–8 cm × 2–6 mm, central to sub-eccentric, firm, yellow to orange, darker toward the base, bruising blue, and there is a yellow mycelium at the stipe base.

Spores are 5–7 × by.5–4.5 μm.

== Distribution and ecology ==
Buchwaldoboletus sphaerocephalus has been recorded in Japan, growing on sawdust of pines, fruiting from July to September.
