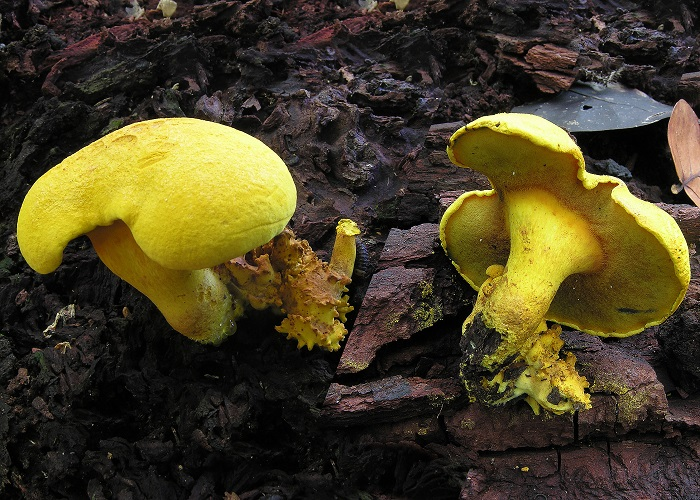

Scientific classification
- Domain: Eukaryota
- Kingdom: Fungi
- Division: Basidiomycota
- Class: Agaricomycetes
- Order: Boletales
- Family: Boletaceae
- Genus: Buchwaldoboletus
- Species: B. acaulis

Binomial name
- Buchwaldoboletus acaulis (Pegler) Both & B. Ortiz

Synonyms
- Pulveroboletus acaulis

= Buchwaldoboletus acaulis =

Species of fungus

Buchwaldoboletus acaulis is a species of bolete fungus in the family Boletaceae native to Lesser Antilles and Martinique. Found on wood in xero-mesophytic forests, it has a convex bright yellow cap, sulfur-yellow pores and stipe, and a brown spore print. Its edibility is unknown.

== Taxonomy and naming ==
Originally described by David Pegler in 1983 as Pulveroboletus acaulis, it was given its current name by Ernst Both and Beatriz Ortiz-Santana in A preliminary survey of the genus Buchwaldoboletus, published in "Bulletin of the Buffalo Society of Natural Sciences" in 2011.

== Description ==
The cap is bright yellow, convex, and measures 3–6.4 cm (1.2–2.5 in) in diameter. The flesh may stain blue where it has been cut or bruised. The pores are small, and the pore surface is sulphur-yellow to pinkish-brown in maturity, staining bluish with injury. The stipe is rudimentary, lateral to very excentric, same color as the cap. There is a yellow mycelium at the stipe base.

The mushroom produces a brown spore print. Spores measure 5.5–8 ×2.5–3.5 μm.
