= Buchwaldoboletus parvulus =

Scientific classification
- Domain: Eukaryota
- Kingdom: Fungi
- Division: Basidiomycota
- Class: Agaricomycetes
- Order: Boletales
- Family: Boletaceae
- Genus: Buchwaldoboletus
- Species: B. parvulus

Binomial name
- Buchwaldoboletus parvulus (Natarajan & Purush.) Both & B. Ortiz, 2011

Synonyms
- Boletus parvulus

Species of fungus

Buchwaldoboletus parvulus is a species of bolete fungus in the family Boletaceae native to India. It grows on dead bamboo stumps, has a convex bright yellow cap, yellow to red-brown pores, and a yellow above, reddish below stipe.

== Taxonomy and naming ==
Originally described by K.V. Natarajan & Purush. as Pulveroboletus parvulus in 1988, it was given its current name by Ernst Both and Beatriz Ortiz-Santana in A preliminary survey of the genus Buchwaldoboletus, published in "Bulletin of the Buffalo Society of Natural Sciences" in 2011.

== Description ==
The cap is bright yellow, convex, pulverulent, and can reach 7–13 mm in diameter. The pores are small, and tubes are adnate, concolorous with the pileus, 3–4 mm deep. The stipe is very short, excentric and concolorous with the cap, becoming olive-brown when cut. Natarajan's description doesn't mention any bluing of the flesh, characteristic for Buchwaldoboletus genus.

Spores measure 5–6 by 3–4 μm.
