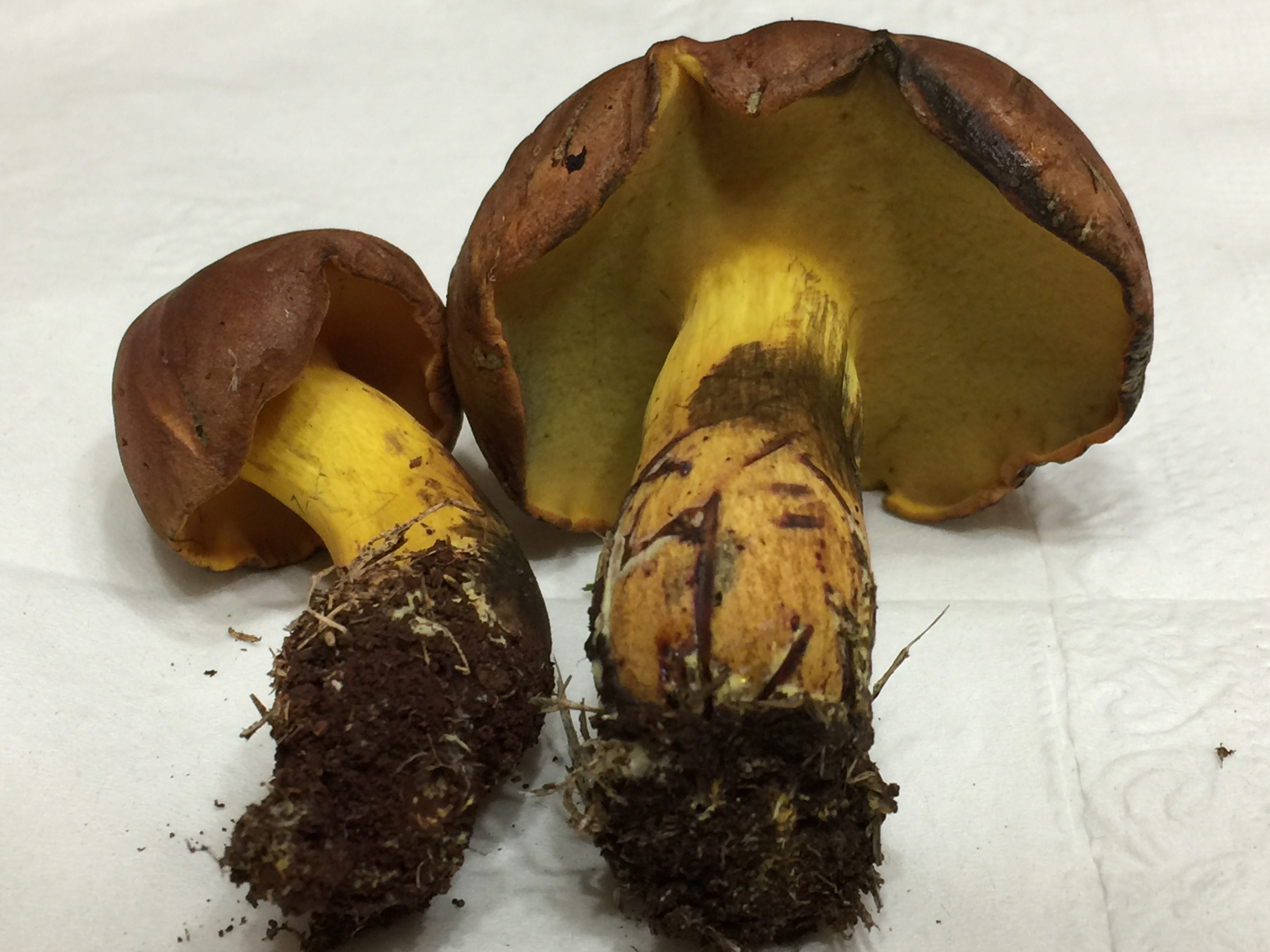

Scientific classification
- Kingdom: Fungi
- Division: Basidiomycota
- Class: Agaricomycetes
- Order: Boletales
- Family: Boletaceae
- Genus: Buchwaldoboletus
- Species: B. xylophilus

Binomial name
- Buchwaldoboletus xylophilus (Petch) Both & B. Ortiz, 2011

Synonyms
- Gyrodon xylophilus (Petch) Heinem. & Rammeloo 1983; Boletus xerophilus Petch 1922; Boletus xylophilus Petch 1922; Pulveroboletus xylophilusSinger 1983

= Buchwaldoboletus xylophilus =

Species of fungus

Buchwaldoboletus xylophilus is a species of bolete fungus in the family Boletaceae native to Asia, found on wood. It has a convex brown cap, and a red-brown stipe. Its edibility is unknown.

== Taxonomy and naming ==
Originally described by Thomas Petch in 1922 as Boletus xylophilus, it was given its current name by Ernst Both and Beatriz Ortiz-Santana in A preliminary survey of the genus Buchwaldoboletus, published in "Bulletin of the Buffalo Society of Natural Sciences" in 2011.

== Description ==
The cap is convex, and its surface is dry to subviscid, and "minutely velvety". Its color is ferrugineous brown. Easily peeled off the mushroom, the soft brown skin is separated from the flesh by a thin gelatinous layer.

The pores are small and angular, and the pore surface stains blue with injury. The stipe is red-brown, and there is a yellow mycelium at the stipe base.

Spores are ellipsoid, smooth, and measure 4.5–5.5 by 3.2–4 μm.

== Distribution ==
Buchwaldoboletus xylophilus has been recorded across Asia throughout Malaysia, Sri Lanka, Hong Kong, and Philippines
