= Franz Joseph Kallenbach =

German mycologist

Franz Joseph Kallenbach (21 August 1893 – 11 September 1944) was a German mycologist.
