= Albert Pilát =

Czech botanist and mycologist (1903–1974)

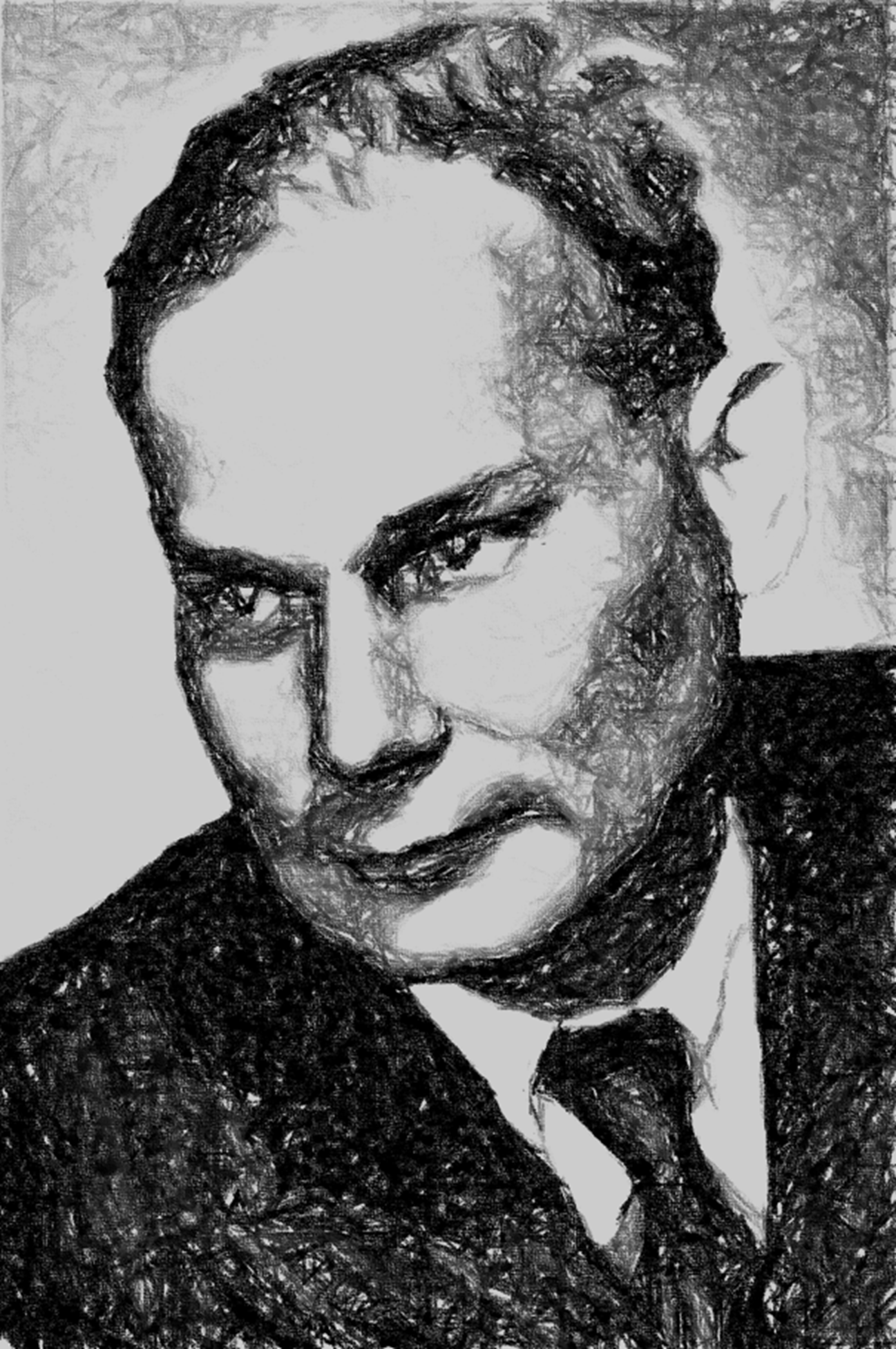
Albert Pilát

Albert Pilát (November 2, 1903 – May 29, 1974) was a Czech botanist and mycologist. He studied at the Faculty of Science at Charles University, under the guidance of Professor Josef Velenovský. In 1930, he joined the National Museum, eventually becoming head of the Mycological Department, and in 1960 a corresponding member of the academy. He was the author of many popular and scholarly publications in the field of mycology and mountain flora. He also served as the main editor of the scientific journal Czech Mycology, and described several species of fungi. His areas of particular interest include polypores and boletes. He explored the Carpathians looking for fungi and travelled widely. Between 1933 and 1948 he edited the exsiccata series Fungi Carpatici lignicoli exsiccati. He was also a skilled photographer.

In 1934, Josef Velenovský published in Monogr. Discom. Bohem. vol.35 on page 289, a genus of fungi within the Hyaloscyphaceae family, Pilatia which was named in his honour.

In 1936, he wrote with Dr Charles Kavina - 'Atlas des champignons de l'Europe'

Pilát died suddenly of cardiac failure in 1974.

== Eponymy and nomenclature ==
A 2024 review assessed how taxa commemorating Pilát have been spelled and standardised in major name repositories. It shows that early authors, especially in Czech sources, typically used the Latin genitive forms pilati (from the well-established Latinised surname Pilatus) and alberti (from Albertus), while later literature and databases often regularised these to pilatii and albertii as nomenclatural practice evolved. The authors recommend following the forms used in the original protologues where they accord with Latin and the Code, and they document frequent cases where database entries list an -ii variant despite an original -i epithet. The paper also separates similarly spelled names that are not eponyms of Pilát—for example, Hepp's Biatora pilati (now Adelolecia pilati) commemorates Mount Pilatus, not Albert Pilát.

The same study catalogues many dedications to Pilát across disparate fungal groups—ranging from agarics and polypores to discomycetes—and traces how changes in the International Code (e.g. guidance now in Art. 60.8 and Rec. 60C) influenced later usage of -ii forms. Examples where the original -i epithets were used include Crepidotus pilati (1929), Tricholoma pilati (1925), Lycoperdon pilati (1922) and several others coined by Velenovský, Zvára, Herink, Litschauer, Bourdot and Boidin; later authors more often adopted pilatii (e.g. in Cortinarius pilatii and Phellinus/Porodaedalea/Sanghuangporus pilatii). The review argues for stability based on protologue usage while noting that some -ii epithets remain correct where validly published under the rules then in force.
