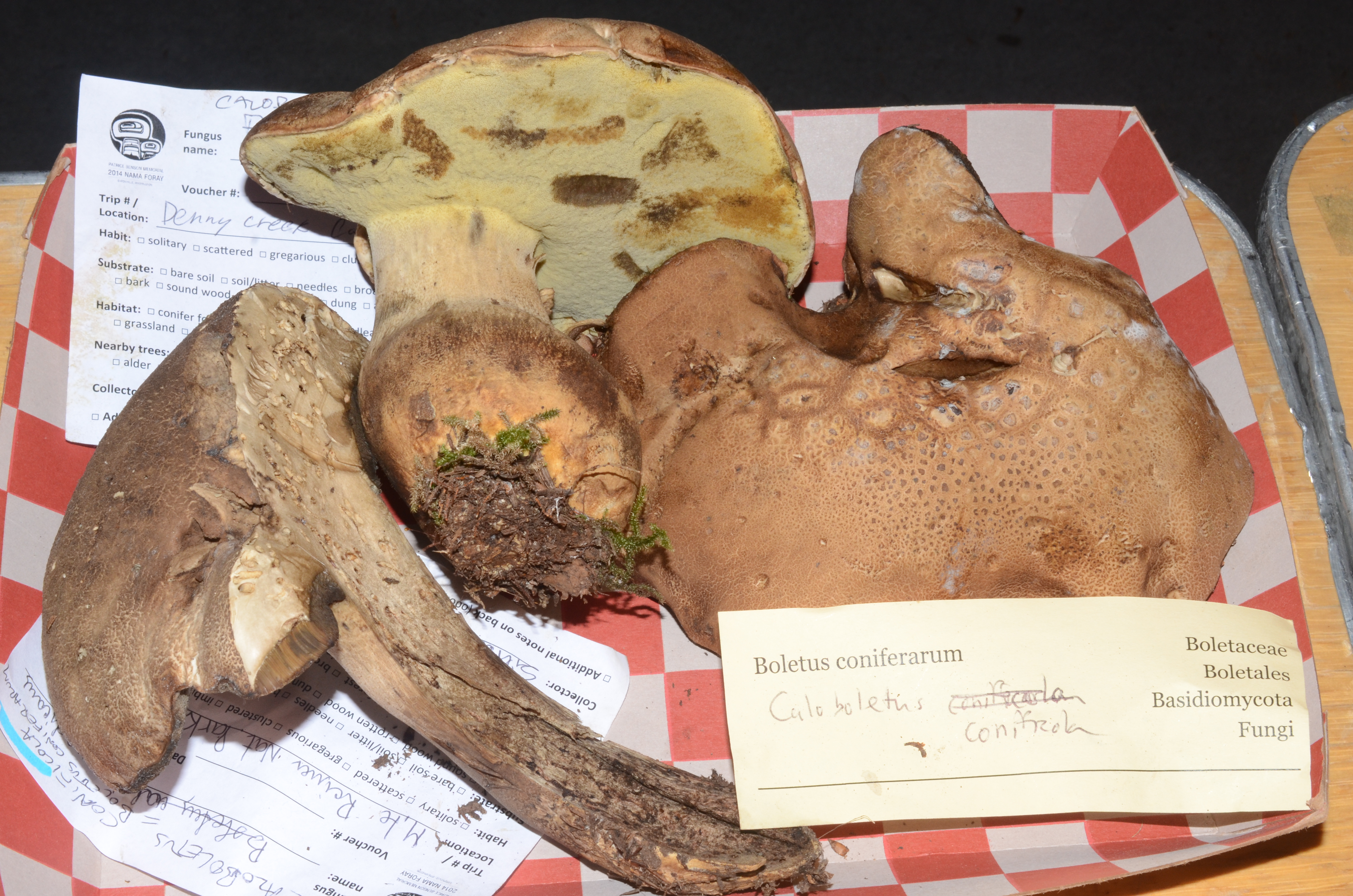

Scientific classification
- Kingdom: Fungi
- Division: Basidiomycota
- Class: Agaricomycetes
- Order: Boletales
- Family: Boletaceae
- Genus: Caloboletus
- Species: C. conifericola

Binomial name
- Caloboletus conifericola Vizzini (2014)

Synonyms
- Boletus coniferarum E.A.Dick & Snell (1969)

= Caloboletus conifericola =

Species of fungus

- Mycological characteristics
- Pores on hymenium
- Cap is convex
- Stipe is bare
- Spore print is olive-brown
- Ecology is mycorrhizal
- Edibility is inedible

Caloboletus conifericola, commonly known as the dark bitter bolete, is a species of mushroom-forming fungus in the family Boletaceae. It is found in the Pacific Northwest.

== Taxonomy ==
Caloboletus conifericola was first described by E.A.Dick & Wally Snell in 1969, as a member of the genus Boletus. However, this name was already preoccupied by a fungus described by the Soviet botanist Lidia Alexandrovna Lebedeva in 1951. Alfredo Vizzini proposed the name Caloboletus conifericola when he circumscribed the genus Caloboletus in 2014.

== Description ==
The cap of Caloboletus conifericola is grayish-brown to olive gray and about 3-10 inches (7-25 cm) across. The stipe is about 2-10 inches (5-15 cm) long and about 1-2 inches wide at the top. It starts out wider at the base, but more or less evens out as the mushroom grows older. The pore surface is yellow, and the mushroom oxidizes blue when bruised.

=== Similar species ===
Caloboletus conifericola can be confused with Caloboletus calopus and Caloboletus frustosus. Caloboletus calopus has a more reticulated stipe than C. conifericola, and C. frustosus has a more cracked cap.

== Habitat and ecology ==
Caloboletus conifericola is found in moss and leaf litter under conifer trees, especially grand fir and western hemlock. It is found fruiting during early fall, soon after the rains come.

== See also ==
- List of North American Boletes
