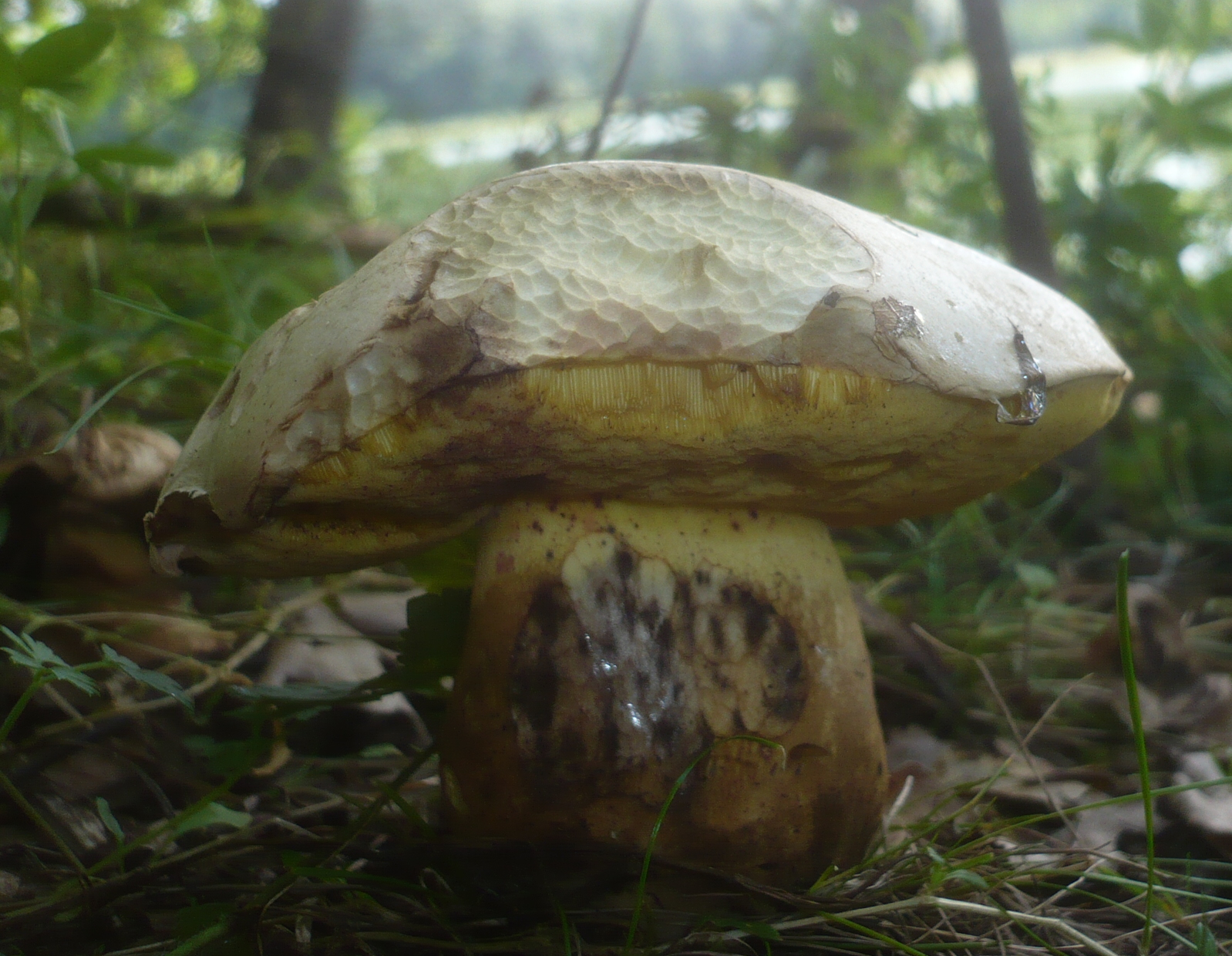

Scientific classification
- Domain: Eukaryota
- Kingdom: Fungi
- Division: Basidiomycota
- Class: Agaricomycetes
- Order: Boletales
- Family: Boletaceae
- Genus: Caloboletus
- Species: C. kluzakii

Binomial name
- Caloboletus kluzakii (Šutara & Špinar) Vizzini (2014)

Synonyms
- Boletus kluzakii Šutara & Špinar (2006)

= Caloboletus kluzakii =

Species of fungus

Caloboletus kluzakii is a bolete mushroom native to Europe, primarily found in southern Bohemia in the Czech Republic. First described in 2006, this distinctive fungus was originally classified as Boletus kluzakii before being transferred to the genus Caloboletus in 2014 based on genetic studies. Named in honour of the Czech mycologist Zdeněk Kluzák, who had attempted to describe it earlier, this uncommon mushroom is characterised by its unique colour progression from whitish to rose-pink or purplish-pink as it matures, with a cap surface that quickly turns red when touched. It grows exclusively in grassy areas under oak trees, sometimes near Scots pine, and features yellow pores on its underside that turn blue when bruised, a yellow stipe with a mesh-like pattern, and flesh that tastes distinctly bitter. Despite its protected habitat in the Luční national natural monument area, the species appears to fruit irregularly, with researchers documenting only ten specimens over an eight-year period.

== Taxonomy ==
Until 2014, the fungus was known as Boletus kluzakii. Changes in the phylogenetic framework of the family Boletaceae prompted the transfer of this species, along with several other related boletes, including Caloboletus calopus, to the genus Caloboletus. It was described scientifically in 2006 by Josef Šutara and Pavel Špinar, from specimens collected in the Czech Republic. The fungus had earlier been published with the name Boletus fallax by Czech mycologist Zdeněk Kluzák in 1988, but this was invalid, as that name had been used previously by E.J.H. Corner for a Malaysian bolete (later transferred to the genus Boletellus as Boletellus fallax). The epithet honours Kluzák's contributions in describing the species.

== Description ==
Caloboletus kluzakii is characterized by a distinctive colour progression of its cap (pileus). When young, the cap appears whitish or pale, sometimes with a slight pinkish tint. As it matures, the cap develops a more pronounced rose-pink or purplish-pink colouration, occasionally showing purple-reddish areas. An identifying feature is that the cap surface quickly turns red when touched or bruised.

The underside of the cap features a yellow spore-bearing surface (hymenophore) with small, round pores that turn blue when bruised. The stipe is yellow and decorated with a yellow mesh-like pattern (reticulation). The flesh (context) beneath the cap's outer layer is red or purplish-red, while in other parts of the mushroom it appears pale yellowish or bright yellow. When cut or damaged, the flesh turns blue. The mushroom has a distinctly bitter taste.

Microscopically, C. kluzakii has smooth, spindle-shaped spores measuring about 11.5–14 by 4.8–6 micrometres. The cap's surface consists of a layer of upright filamentous cells (trichoderm) that gradually collapse as the mushroom matures.

Caloboletus kluzakii is closely related to Caloboletus radicans (formerly Boletus radicans), but can be distinguished by its red or purplish-red layer under the cap surface and its tendency to develop pink to reddish colouration as it ages.

== Habitat and distribution ==
Caloboletus kluzakii has a limited known distribution, having been documented primarily in southern Bohemia in the Czech Republic. The species was first discovered in 1992 at an ecological site known as the Luční fish-pond dam near Sezimovo Ústí. This location, designated as a "national natural monument" (Luční), has been recognized for its ecological significance and placed under environmental protection.

The mushroom appears to have very specific habitat requirements. It grows solitarily on soil in a grassy area under oak trees (Quercus robur), sometimes with Scots pine (Pinus sylvestris) in the vicinity. The elevation of its documented habitat is roughly 420 metres above sea level.

Fruiting patterns suggest C. kluzakii is relatively uncommon even within its known habitat. Documented collections indicate it typically appears in late summer to early autumn, with most specimens found in September. Between 1992 and 2000, researchers observed only ten fruiting bodies of this bolete at the NNM Luční site, with most appearing in September and one recorded in July. No specimens were found during surveys in 1993, 1995, 1998, 1999, or between 2001 and 2005, suggesting that fruiting might be irregular or dependent on specific environmental conditions.
