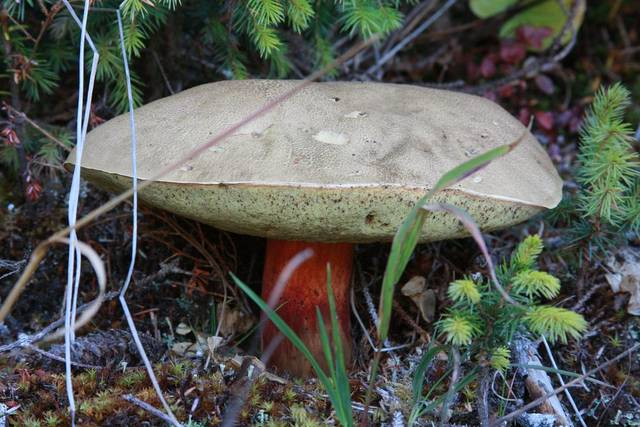

Scientific classification
- Kingdom: Fungi
- Division: Basidiomycota
- Class: Agaricomycetes
- Order: Boletales
- Family: Boletaceae
- Genus: Caloboletus
- Species: C. rubripes

Binomial name
- Caloboletus rubripes (Thiers) Vizzini

Synonyms
- Boletus rubripes Thiers (1965)

= Caloboletus rubripes =

Species of fungus

Caloboletus rubripes Mycological characteristics
- Pores on hymenium
- Cap is convex
- Hymenium is adnate
- Stipe is bare
- Spore print is olive-brown
- Ecology is mycorrhizal
- Edibility is inedible

Caloboletus rubripes, commonly known as the red-stemmed bitter bolete or the red-stipe bolete, is a species of fungus in the family Boletaceae. It was known as Boletus rubripes until 2014.

The fruit bodies (mushrooms) are robust, with caps up to 18 cm (7 in) in diameter, atop thick stipes 5–12 cm (2–4 3/4 in) long. The flesh has a very strong bluing reaction when cut or damaged. It can be differentiated from similar boletes by its cap color and non-reticulate stipe.

It forms mycorrhizal relationships, primarily with conifers. The mushrooms are non-toxic, but are so bitter as to be inedible.

== Taxonomy ==
The species was first described scientifically by American mycologist Harry D. Thiers in 1965, based on collections he made in Jackson State Forest, Mendocino County, California, in late October 1962. It is commonly known as the "red-stipe bolete" or the red-stemmed bitter bolete. It was transferred to Caloboletus by Italian mycologist Alfredo Vizzini in 2014, following recent molecular studies that outlined a new phylogenetic framework for the Boletaceae.

== Description ==
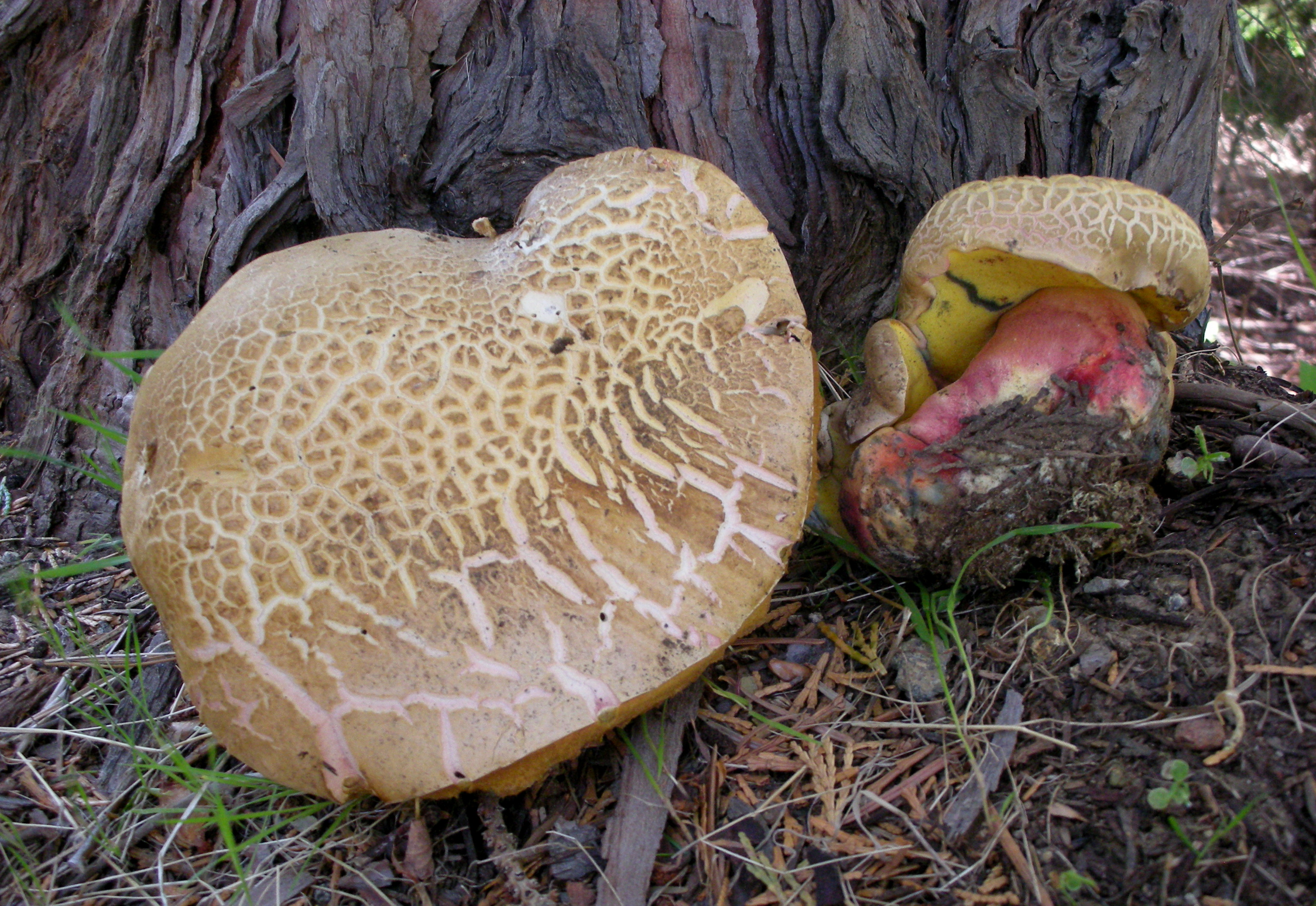
The cap surface often develops cracks in age.

The cap is convex to cushion-shaped, before flattening out in maturity, attaining diameters of 4–20 cm (1 5/8–7 7/8 in). The cap margin is rolled or curved inward and remains that way until maturity. Its surface is dry, with a velvet-like to slightly hairy texture. It often develops cracks in age. The cap color is variable, ranging from buff to olive-buff to olive-brown; it stains brown when bruised or injured. The flesh is whitish to pale yellow, and will quickly turn blue when cut or exposed to air. The odor of the fruit body ranges from indistinct to unpleasant, and its taste is bitter. The pore surface on the underside of the cap is initially yellow before turning olive-yellow in age; it instantly turns blue when bruised. The angular pores number about 1–3 per millimeter and the tubes comprising the hymenophore are 8–16 mm (3/8–5/8 in) long.

The stem measures 5–15 cm (2–5 7/8 in) long by 2–5 cm (3/4–2 in) wide, and either nearly equal in width throughout, clavate, or tapered slightly towards either end. The stem is solid (i.e., not hollow), and has a dry surface with slight longitudinal grooves. Its color is pinkish-red to purple-red except for a yellow region near the top and yellow mycelium at the base. The stem lacks reticulation or a ring.

Caloboletus rubripes produces an olive-brown spore print. The spores are somewhat spindle-shaped to somewhat cylindrical, smooth, and measure 12–18 by 4–5 μm. The basidia (spore-bearing cells) are club shaped, four-spored, and measure 26–30 by 7–13 μm. There are no clamp connections in the hyphae.

=== Similar species ===
Somewhat similar in appearance is Caloboletus calopus, which also has a red and yellow stipe, and a dry tan-colored cap. Unlike C. rubripes, it has a finely reticulate stipe. Boletus coniferarum is distinguished from C. rubripes by its stem reticulation and by the absence of red coloration. Other similar species include Boletus edulis and B. smithii.

== Habitat and distribution ==
The fruit bodies grow on the ground singly, scattered, or in clusters. They are usually found in coniferous forests, but also in association with oak. Found in North America, the distribution includes the Pacific Northwest region of the US (including Idaho), the southwestern US, and Mexico. They are particularly common in New Mexico and Colorado. Fruit bodies typically appear in the summer and fall. Alexander Smith has noted that they often appear with C. coniferarum and C. calopus.

== Uses ==
The mushrooms are inedible owing to the bitter taste. They are used in mushroom dyeing to produce beige, light brown or light golden brown colors, depending on the mordant used.

== See also ==
- List of North American boletes
