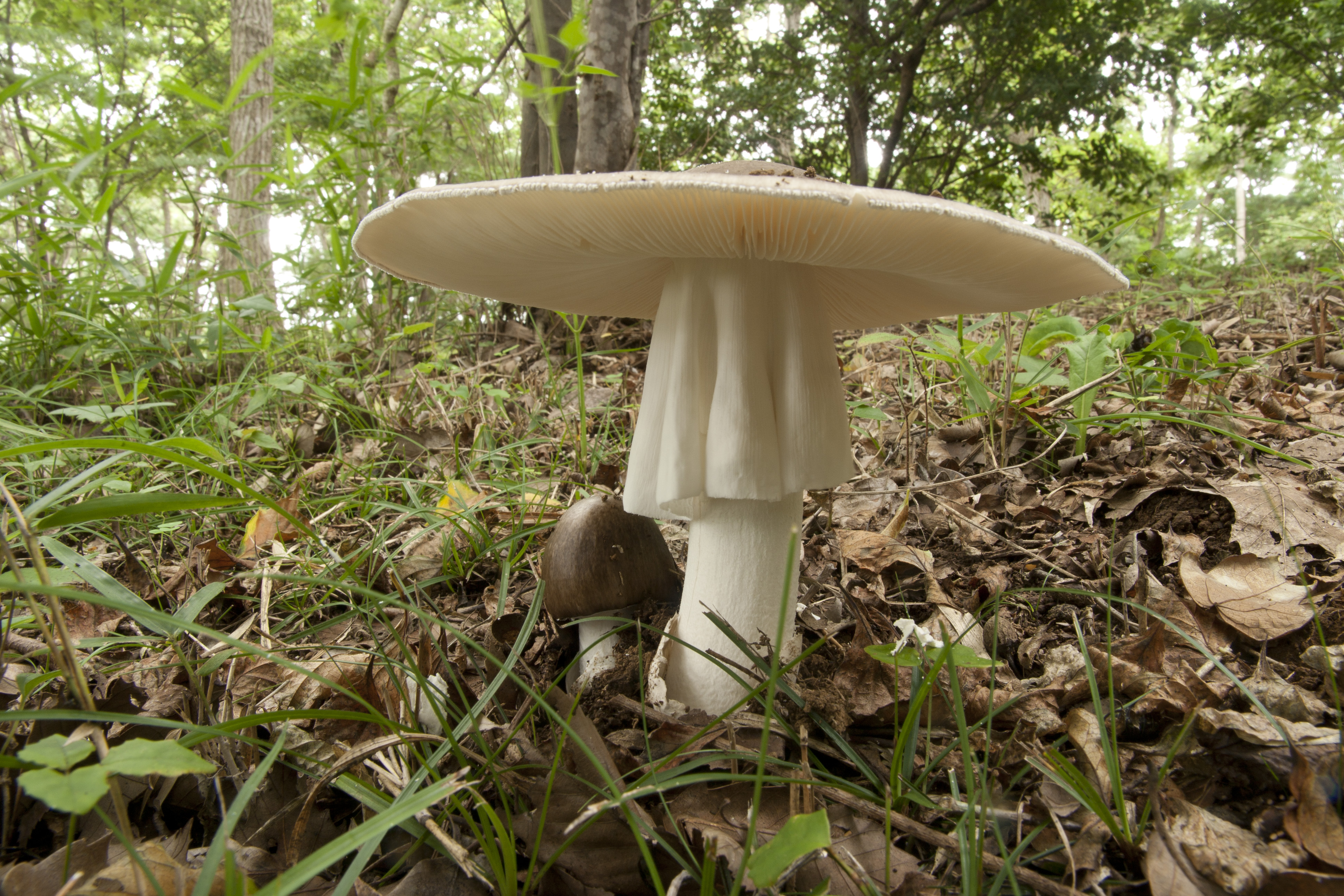

Scientific classification
- Kingdom: Fungi
- Division: Basidiomycota
- Class: Agaricomycetes
- Order: Agaricales
- Family: Amanitaceae
- Genus: Amanita
- Subgenus: Amanita subg. Amanitina
- Section: Amanita sect. Roanokenses
- Species: A. pseudoporphyria

Binomial name
- Amanita pseudoporphyria Hongo (1957)

= Amanita pseudoporphyria =

Species of fungus

Amanita pseudoporphyria
- Mycological characteristics
- Gills on hymenium
- Cap is convex or flat
- Hymenium is free
- Stipe has a ring and volva
- Spore print is white
- Ecology is mycorrhizal
- Edibility is poisonous

Amanita pseudoporphyria, also known as Hongo's false death cap, is a species of agaric fungus from the family Amanitaceae.

== Similar species ==
The species differs only slightly from Amanita caojizong (Note: Formerly known as Amanita manginiana sensu W.F. Chiu.) by having more abundant inflated cells of its volva, and its ellipsoid to broad ellipsoid spores.

== Taxonomy ==
The species was originally described in Japan.

This mushroom was classified in Amanita section Phalloideae in the past; now it is classified in section Roanokenses.

== Distribution and habitat ==
The species is quite common in southern China, and is now also known in North India, Thailand, and Nepal. It grows solitarily or gregariously in coniferous forests.

== Toxicity ==
This mushroom is poisonous.

In 2000, a 66-year-old man with diabetes experienced delayed onset acute kidney injury associated with the ingestion of this mushroom. Effects occurred similar to that of the intoxication symptoms associated with the North American species Amanita smithiana and the Mediterranean A. proxima. Kidney biopsy of the patient showed acute tubular necrosis with glomerular minor abnormalities. Treatment included a three-week period of haemodialysis, after which the patient fully recovered from the acute kidney failure in two months.

Wang et al. (2004) and Yang (date unknown) reported that it is sold in free markets in Yunnan, China, mixed with A. caojizong.

=== Mislabelling as "porcini" in an online retailer ===
There is a case where scientists analyzed several commercial processed food items that contained mushrooms, including a bag of what was claimed to be dried "porcini mushrooms" sold online. DNA barcoding revealed the bag to contain A. pseudoporphyria (as well as Caloboletus yunnanensis, Retiboletus fuscus, and Tylopilus microsporus). Multiple customers left reviews, many of them negative. For instance, one customer wrote that the product had "an extremely bitter flavor with a bad aftertaste", while another claimed to have been "poisoned". In July of 2019, the scientists reached out to the online retailer to inform them of their discovery, but the mushrooms were still for sale as of 2021.

== Gallery ==
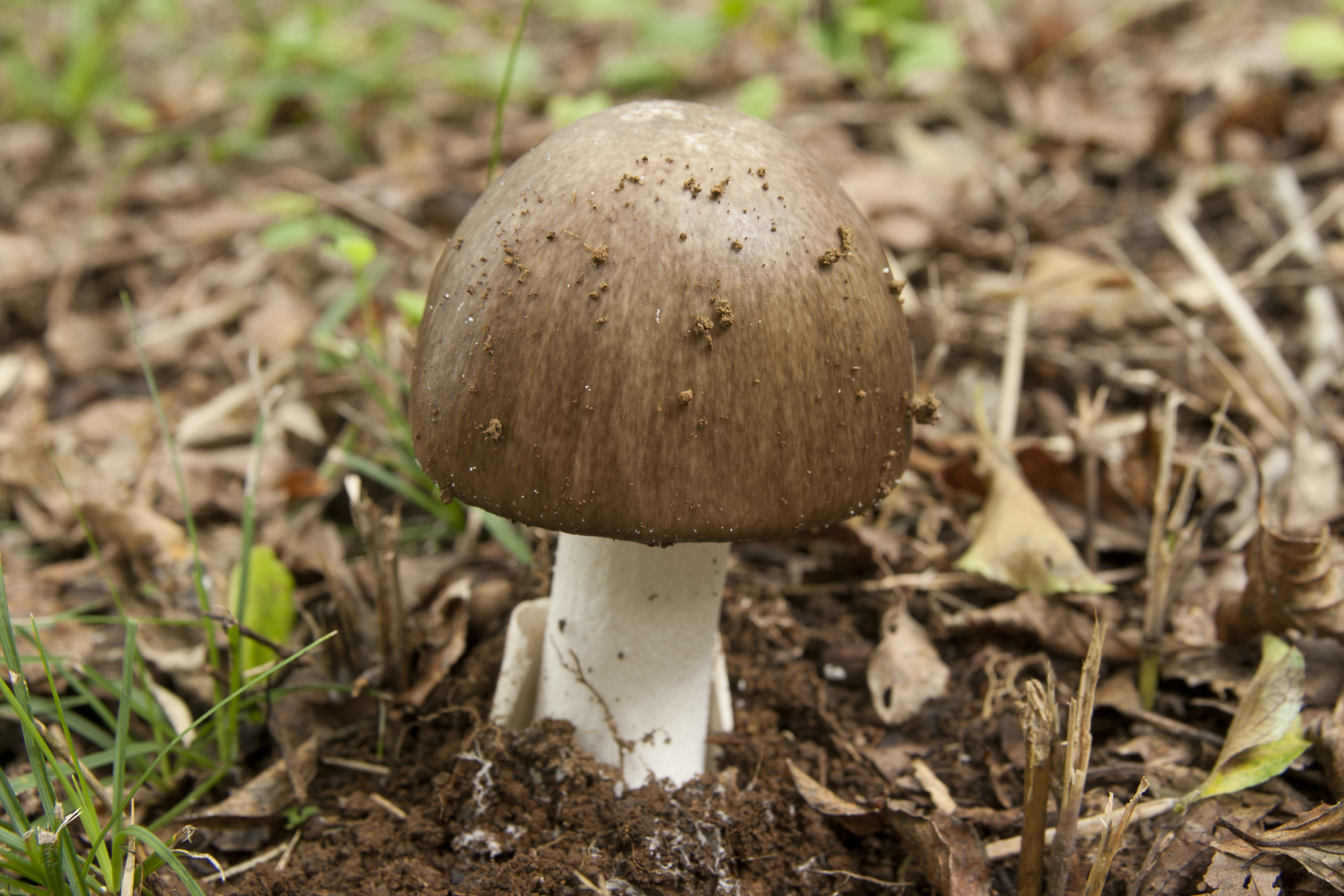

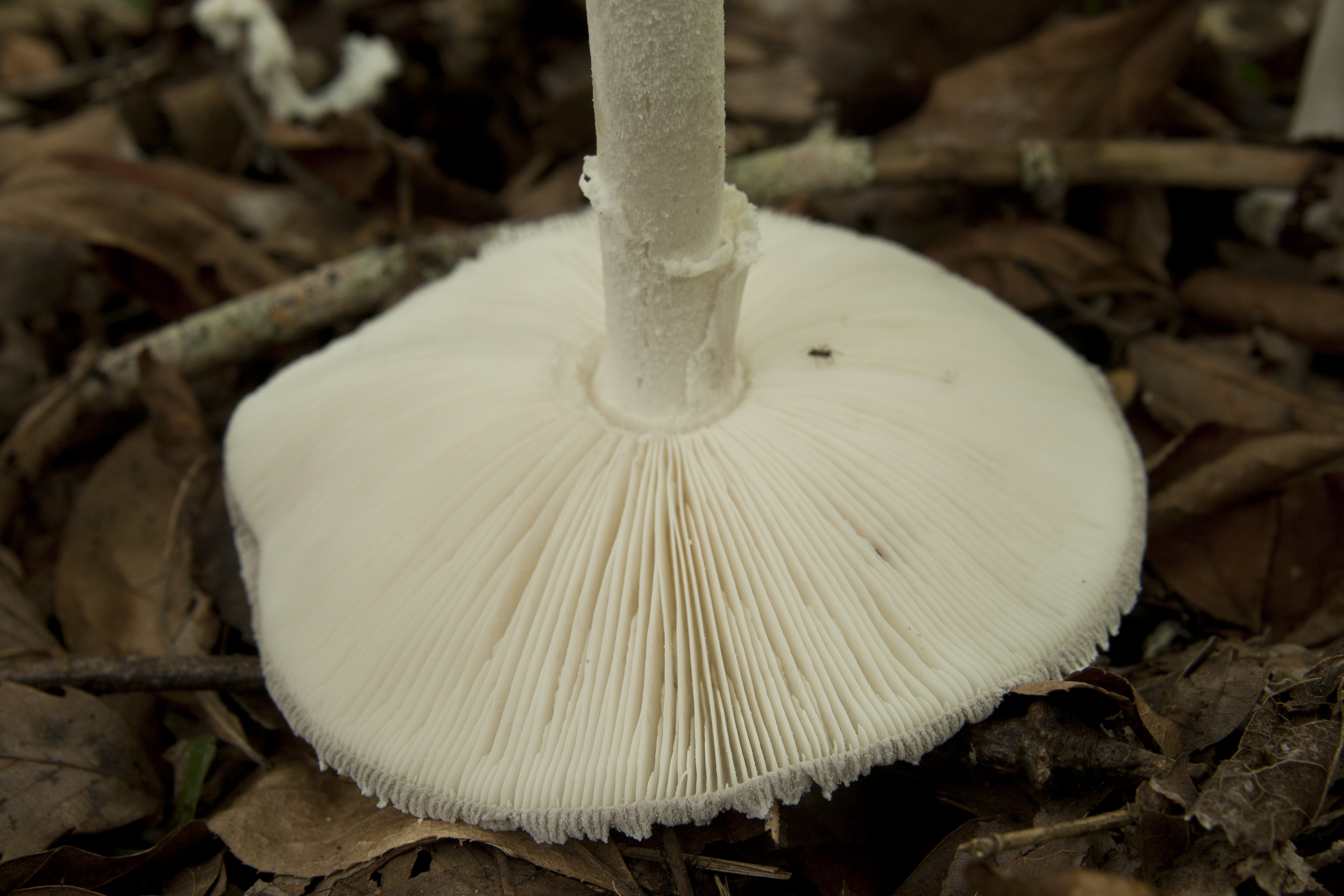

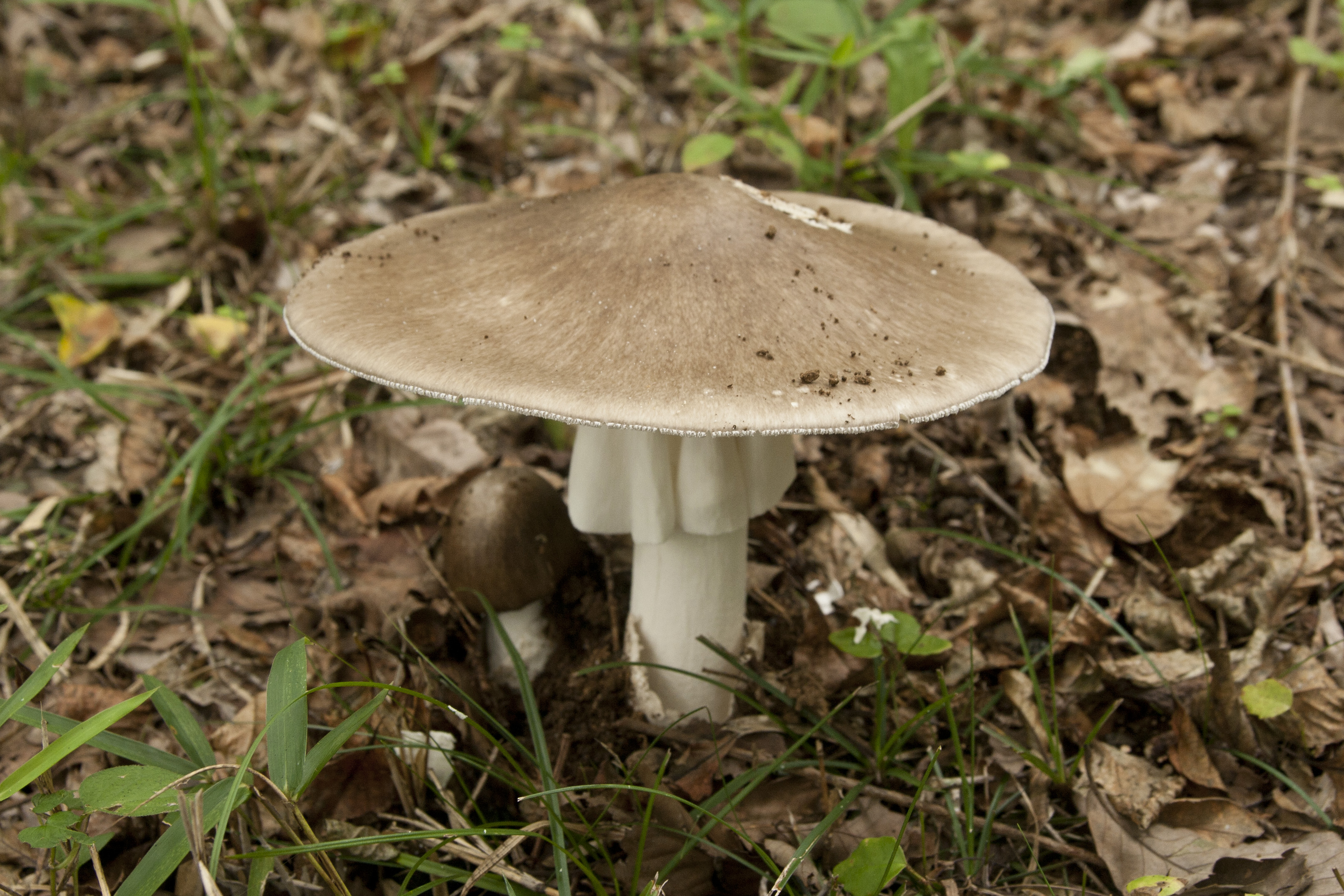

== See also ==
- List of Amanita species
