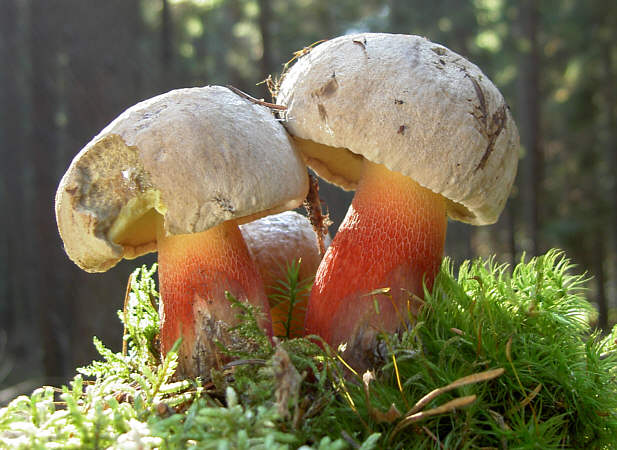
- Caloboletus calopus

Scientific classification
- Kingdom: Fungi
- Division: Basidiomycota
- Class: Agaricomycetes
- Order: Boletales
- Family: Boletaceae
- Genus: Caloboletus; Vizzini (2014)

Type species
- Caloboletus calopus (Pers.) Vizzini (2014)

= Caloboletus =

Genus of fungi

Caloboletus is a fungal genus in the family Boletaceae. It was circumscribed by Italian mycologist Alfredo Vizzini with Caloboletus calopus as the type species. The erection of Caloboletus follows recent molecular studies that outlined a new phylogenetic framework for the Boletaceae. Boletus peckii was also transferred to this genus by Vizzini, but was subsequently moved to the genus Butyriboletus based on molecular evidence. The generic name Caloboletus, derived from the Greek calos "nice", refers to the attractive red coloring of the stipe.

== Species ==
In 2023, a new species was identified in China. As of October 2025, Index Fungorum and Catalogue of Life list the following species:

Image	Name	Taxon Author	Year	Distribution
	Caloboletus calopus	(Pers.) Vizzini	2014	Pacific Northwest and Michigan, Europe
	Caloboletus conifericola	Vizzini	2014	Washington, Oregon, Alaska, British Columbia
	Caloboletus firmus	(Frost) Vizzini	2014	New England
	Caloboletus frustosus	(Snell & E.A. Dick) D. Arora & J.L. Frank	2014	British Columbia, California, Oregon, Washington
	Caloboletus griseoflavus	L. Fan, N. Mao & T.Y. Zhao	2023	China (Shanxi)
	Caloboletus guanyui	N.K. Zeng, H. Chai & S. Jiang	2019	China (Hainan, Fujian)
	Caloboletus inedulis	(Murrill) Vizzini	2014	North America
	Caloboletus kluzakii	(Šutara & Špinar) Vizzini	2014	Czech Republic
	Caloboletus marshii	D. Arora, C.F. Schwarz & J.L. Frank	2014	United States
	Caloboletus panniformis	(Taneyama & Har. Takah.) Vizzini	2014	Japan, China
	Caloboletus polygonius	(A.E. Hills & Vassiliades) Vizzini	2014	Greece
	Caloboletus radicans	(Pers.) Vizzini	2014	Europe
	Caloboletus roseipes	(Bessette, Both & A.R. Bessette) Vizzini	2014	North America
	Caloboletus roseo-olivaceus	(J. Blum) N. Schwab	2019	Europe
	Caloboletus rubripes	(Thiers) Vizzini	2014	California
	Caloboletus taienus	(W.F. Chiu) Ming Zhang & T.H. Li	2017	China (Guangdong)
	Caloboletus xiangtoushanensis	Ming Zhang, T.H. Li & X.J. Zhong	2017	China (Guangdong, Fujian)
	Caloboletus yunnanensis	Kuan Zhao & Zhu L. Yang	2014	China (Yunnan)
