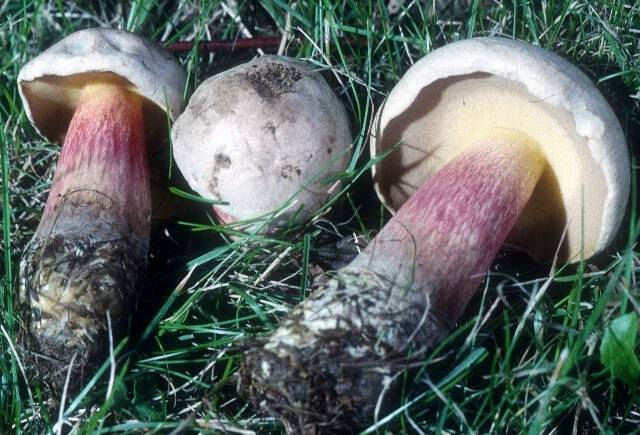

Scientific classification
- Domain: Eukaryota
- Kingdom: Fungi
- Division: Basidiomycota
- Class: Agaricomycetes
- Order: Boletales
- Family: Boletaceae
- Genus: Caloboletus
- Species: C. inedulis

Binomial name
- Caloboletus inedulis (Murrill) Vizzini (2014)

Synonyms
- Ceriomyces inedulis Murrill (1938); Boletus inedulis (Murrill) Murrill (1938)

= Caloboletus inedulis =

Species of fungus

Caloboletus inedulis is a bolete fungus of the family Boletaceae that is native to North America. Until 2014, it was known as Boletus inedulis. Recent changes in the phylogenetic framework of the Boletaceae prompted the transfer of this species, along with several other related boletes, including Caloboletus calopus, to the genus Caloboletus. The species is inedible.

== See also ==
- List of North American boletes
