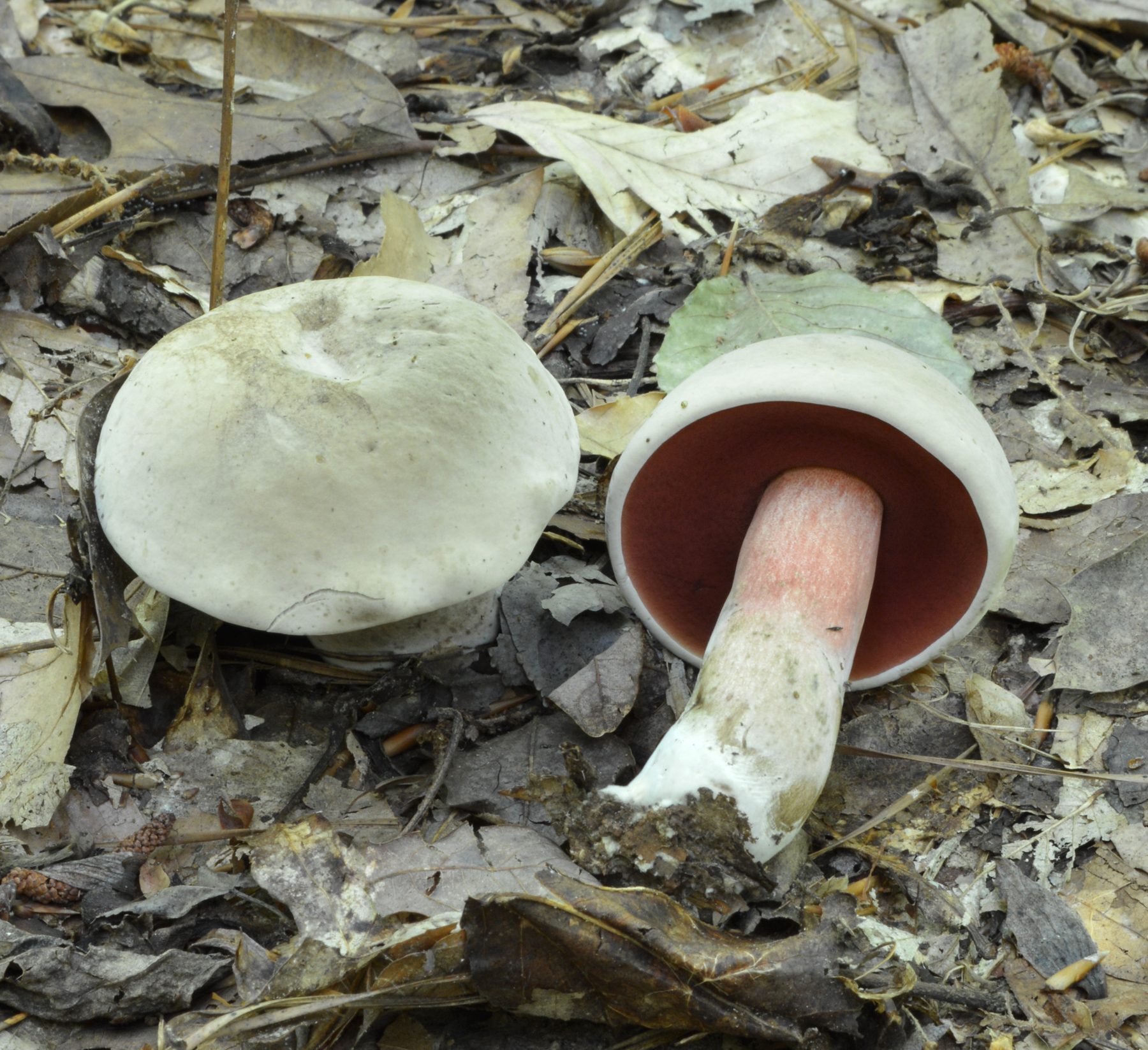

Scientific classification
- Kingdom: Fungi
- Division: Basidiomycota
- Class: Agaricomycetes
- Order: Boletales
- Family: Boletaceae
- Genus: Caloboletus
- Species: C. firmus

Binomial name
- Caloboletus firmus (Frost) Vizzini (2014)

Synonyms
- Boletus firmus Frost (1874)

= Caloboletus firmus =

Species of fungus

Caloboletus firmus is a bolete fungus native to North America. Until 2014, it was known as Boletus firmus. Changes in the phylogenetic framework of the family Boletaceae prompted the transfer of this species, along with several other related boletes, including Caloboletus calopus, to the genus Caloboletus. It was first described scientifically in 1874 by American botanist Charles Christopher Frost from specimens collected in New England.

== See also ==
- List of North American boletes
