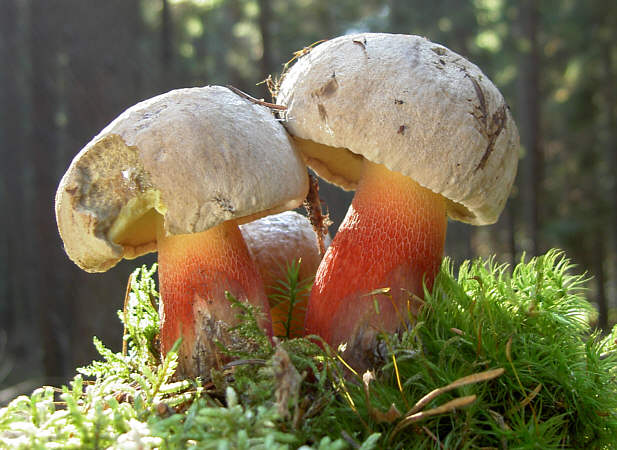

Scientific classification
- Domain: Eukaryota
- Kingdom: Fungi
- Division: Basidiomycota
- Class: Agaricomycetes
- Order: Boletales
- Family: Boletaceae
- Genus: Caloboletus
- Species: C. calopus

Binomial name
- Caloboletus calopus (Pers.) Vizzini (2014)

Synonyms
- Boletus calopus Pers. (1801); Boletus olivaceus Schaeff. (1774); Boletus lapidum J.F.Gmel. (1792); Boletus pachypus var. olivaceus (Schaeff.) Pers. (1825); Boletus subtomentosus subsp. calopus (Pers.) Pers. (1825); Dictyopus calopus (Pers.) Quél. (1886); Tubiporus calopus (Pers.) Maire (1937)

= Caloboletus calopus =

Species of fungus in the family Boletaceae

Caloboletus calopus Mycological characteristics
- Pores on hymenium
- Cap is convex
- Hymenium is adnate
- Stipe is bare
- Spore print is olive-brown
- Ecology is mycorrhizal
- Edibility is poisonous

Caloboletus calopus, commonly known as the bitter bolete, bitter beech bolete or scarlet-stemmed bolete, is a species of fungus in the bolete family. Christiaan Persoon first described Boletus calopus in 1801. Modern molecular phylogenetics showed that it was only distantly related to the type species of Boletus and required placement in a new genus; Caloboletus was erected in 2014, with C. calopus designated as the type species.

The stout fruit bodies are attractively coloured, with a beige to olive cap up to 15 cm (6 in) across, yellow pores, and a reddish stipe up to 15 cm (6 in) long and 5 cm (2 in) wide. The pale yellow flesh stains blue when broken or bruised. Its red stipe distinguishes it from Boletus edulis.

Appearing in coniferous and deciduous woodland in summer and autumn, the species is found in Eurasia and North America. Although not typically considered edible due to an intensely bitter taste that does not disappear with cooking, there are reports of it being consumed in eastern Europe.

== Taxonomy ==
Caloboletus calopus was originally published under the name Boletus olivaceus by Jacob Christian Schäffer in 1774, but this name is unavailable for use as it was later sanctioned for another species. Johann Friedrich Gmelin's 1792 synonym Boletus lapidum is also illegitimate. Christiaan Hendrik Persoon described the mushroom in 1801; its specific name is derived from the Greek καλος/kalos ("pretty") and πους/pous ("foot"), referring to its brightly coloured stipe. The German name, Schönfußröhrling or "pretty-foot bolete", is a literal translation. Alternate common names are scarlet-stemmed bolete and bitter beech bolete.

Other synonyms include binomials resulting from generic transfers to Dictyopus by Lucien Quélet in 1886, and Tubiporus by René Maire in 1937. Boletus frustosus, originally published as a distinct species by Wally Snell and Esther Dick in 1941, was later described as a variety of B. calopus by Orson K. Miller and Roy Watling in 1968. Estadès and Lannoy described the variety ruforubraporus and the form ereticulatus from Europe in 2001.

In his 1986 infrageneric classification of the genus Boletus, Rolf Singer placed C. calopus as the type species of the section Calopodes, which includes species characterised by having a whitish to yellowish flesh, bitter taste, and a blue staining reaction in the tube walls. Other species in section Calopodes include C. radicans, C. inedulis, B. peckii, and B. pallidus. Genetic analysis published in 2013 showed that C. calopus and many (but not all) red-pored boletes were part of a dupainii clade (named for Boletus (now Rubroboletus) dupainii), well-removed from the core group of the type species B. edulis and relatives within the Boletineae. This indicated it needed placement in a new genus. This took place in 2014, B. calopus was transferred to (and designated the type species of) the new genus Caloboletus by Italian mycologist Alfredo Vizzini.

== Description ==
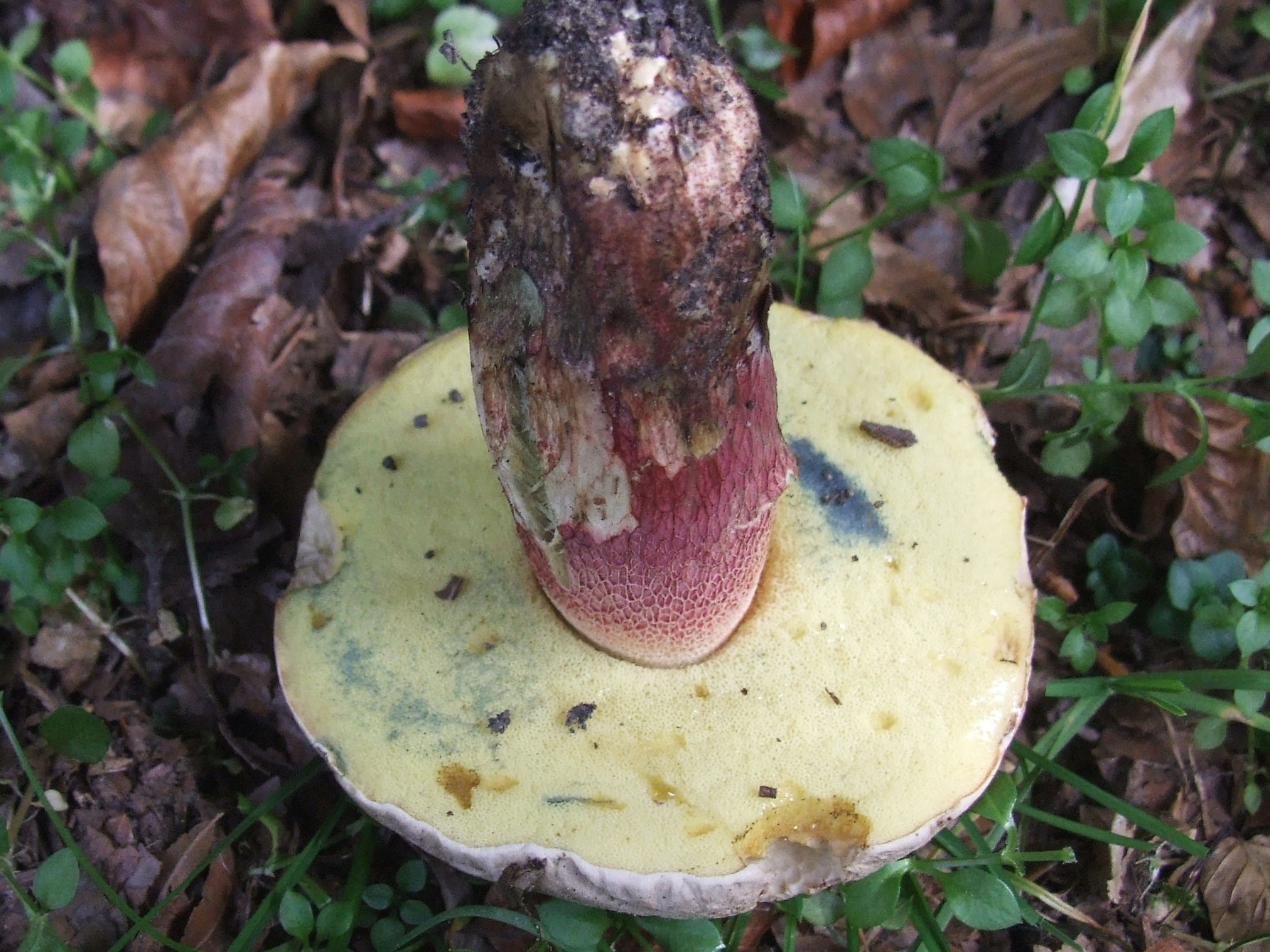
The yellowish pores turn blue when injured.

Up to 15 centimetres (6 in) or rarely 20 cm (8 in) in diameter, the cap is beige to olive and initially almost globular before opening out to a hemispherical and then convex shape. The surface of the cap is smooth or has minute hairs, and sometimes develops cracks with age. The cap cuticle hangs over the cap margin. The pore surface is initially pale yellow before deepening to an olive-yellow in maturity, and quickly turns blue when it is injured. The pores, numbering one or two per millimetre, are circular when young but become more angular as the mushroom ages. The tubes are up to 2 cm (0.8 in) deep.

The attractively coloured stipe is typically yellow above to pink-red below, with a straw-coloured network (reticulation) near the top or over the upper half; occasionally the entire stipe is reddish. It measures 7–15 cm (2.8–5.9 in) long by 2–5 cm (0.8–2.0 in) thick, and is either fairly equal in width throughout, or thicker towards the base. Sometimes, the reddish stipe colour of mature mushrooms or harvested specimens that are a few days old disappears completely, and is replaced with ochre-brown tones. The pale yellow flesh stains blue when broken, the discolouration spreading out from the damaged area. Its smell can be strong, and has been likened to ink. The spore print is olive to olive-brown. The spores are smooth and elliptical, measuring 13–19 by 5–6 μm. The basidia (spore-bearing cells) are club-shaped, four-spored, and measure 30–38 by 9–12 μm. The cystidia are club-shaped to spindle-shaped, hyaline, and measure 25–40 by 10–15 μm.

Variety frustosus is morphologically similar to the main type, but its cap becomes areolate (marked out into small areas by cracks and crevices) in maturity. Its spores are slightly smaller too, measuring 11–15 by 4–5.5 μm. In the European form ereticulatus, the reticulations on the upper stipe are replaced with fine reddish granules, while the variety ruforubraporus has pinkish-red pores.

=== Similar species ===
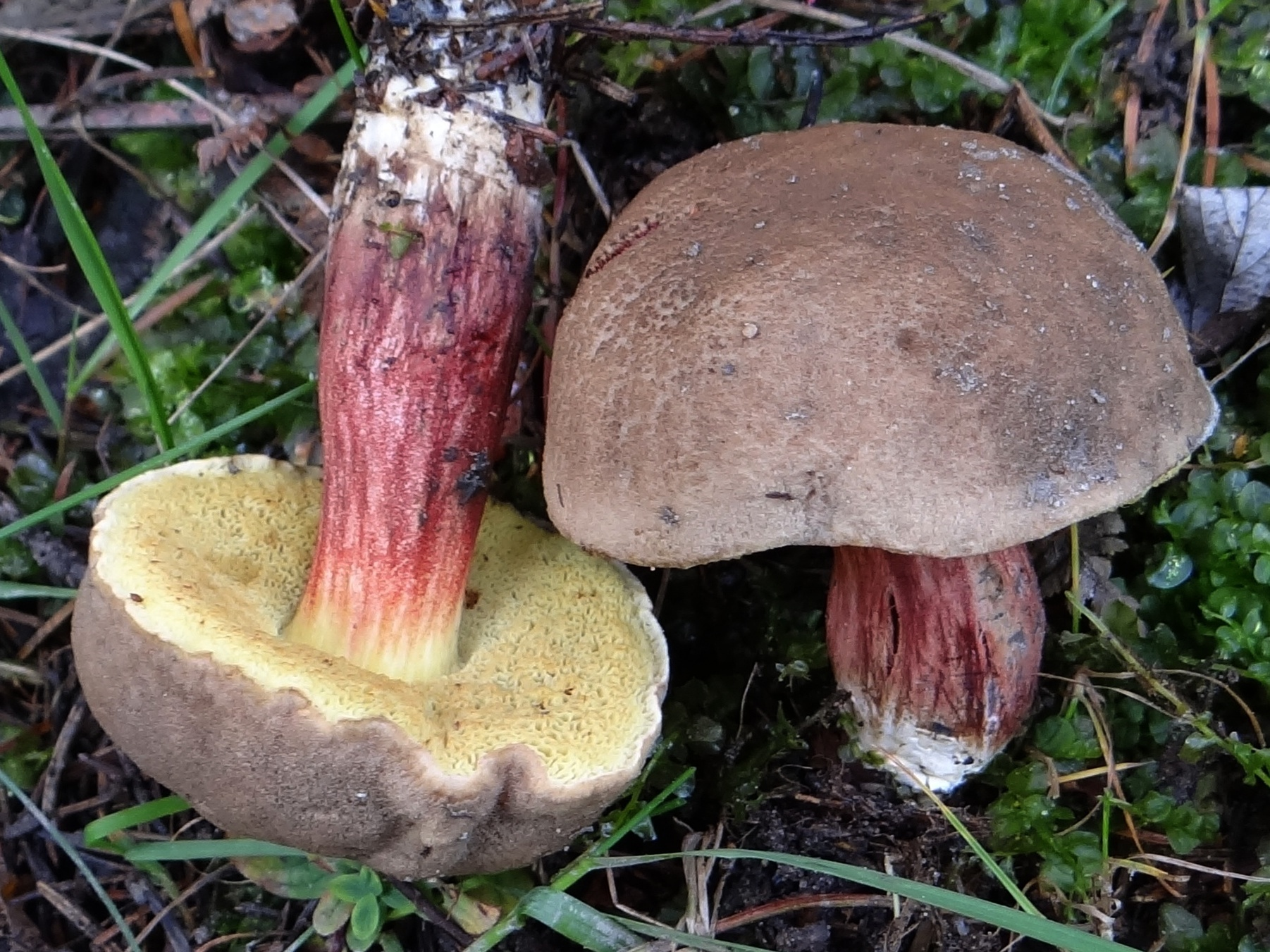
Xerocomellus chrysenteron has a non-reticulated stipe.

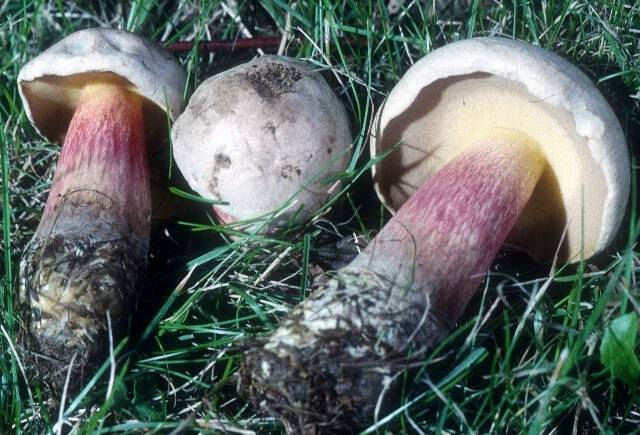
Caloboletus inedulis is smaller with a lighter-coloured cap.

The overall colouration of Caloboletus calopus, with its pale cap, yellow pores and red stipe, is not shared with any other bolete. Large pale specimens resemble Suillellus luridus, and the cap of Rubroboletus satanas is a similar colour but this species has red pores. Fruit bodies in poor condition could be confused with Xerocomellus chrysenteron but the stipes of this species are not reticulated. Edible species such as B. edulis lack a red stipe. It closely resembles the similarly inedible C. radicans, which lacks the redness on the stipe. Like C. calopus, the western North American species C. rubripes also has a bitter taste, similarly coloured cap, and yellowish pores that bruise blue, but it lacks reticulation on its reddish stipe. Found in northwestern North America, B. coniferarum lacks reddish or pinkish colouration in its yellow reticulate stipe, and has a darker, olive-grey to deep brown cap.

Two eastern North American species, C. inedulis and C. roseipes, also have an appearance similar to C. calopus. C. inedulis produces smaller fruit bodies with a white to greyish-white cap, while C. roseipes associates solely with hemlock. C. firmus, found in the eastern United States, eastern Canada, and Costa Rica, has a pallid cap colour, reddish stipe, and bitter taste, but unlike C. calopus, has red pores and lacks stipe reticulation. C. panniformis, a Japanese species described as new to science in 2013, bears a resemblance to C. calopus, but can be distinguished by its rough cap surface, or microscopically by the amyloid-staining cells in the flesh of the cap, and morphologically distinct cystidia on the stipe.

== Distribution and habitat ==
An ectomycorrhizal species, Caloboletus calopus grows in coniferous and deciduous woodland, often at higher altitudes, especially under beech and oak. Fruit bodies occur singly or in large groups. The species grows on chalky ground from July to December, in Northern Europe, and North America's Pacific Northwest and Michigan. In North America, its range extends south to Mexico. Variety frustosus is known from California and the Rocky Mountains of Idaho. In 1968, after comparing European and North American collections, Miller and Watling suggested that the typical form of C. calopus does not occur in the United States. Similar comparisons by other authors have led them to the opposite conclusion, and the species has since been included in several North American field guides. The bolete has been recorded from the Black Sea region in Turkey, from under Populus ciliata and Abies pindrow in Rawalpindi and Nathia Gali in Pakistan, Yunnan Province in China, Korea, and Taiwan.

== Edibility ==
Although an attractive-looking bolete, the species is not considered edible on account of its very bitter taste, which does not disappear upon cooking. There are reports of it being eaten in far eastern Russia and Ukraine.

== Biochemistry ==
Structure of calopin

The bitter taste is largely due to the compounds calopin and a δ-lactone derivative, O-acetylcyclocalopin A. These compounds contains a structural motif known as a 3-methylcatechol unit, which is rare in natural products. A total synthesis of calopin was reported in 2003. The frustosus variety is reported as causing severe sickness in Europe.

The pulvinic acid derivatives atromentic acid, variegatic acid, and xerocomic acid are present in B. calopus mushrooms. These compounds inhibit cytochrome P450—major enzymes involved in drug metabolism and bioactivation. Other compounds found in the fruit bodies include calopin B, and the sesquiterpenoid compounds cyclopinol and boletunones A and B. The latter two highly oxygenated compounds have significant free-radical scavenging activity in vitro. The compounds 3-Octanone (47.0% of total volatile compounds), 3-Octanol (27.0%), 1-octen-3-ol (15.0%), and limonene (3.6%) are the predominant volatile components that give the fruit body its odour.

== See also ==
- List of North American boletes
