= Amanita manginiana =

Scientific classification
- Domain: Eukaryota
- Kingdom: Fungi
- Division: Basidiomycota
- Class: Agaricomycetes
- Order: Agaricales
- Family: Amanitaceae
- Genus: Amanita
- Species: A. manginiana

Binomial name
- Amanita manginiana Har. & Pat.

Species of fungus

Amanita manginiana Mycological characteristics
- Gills on hymenium
- Cap is umbonate
- Hymenium is free
- Stipe has a volva
- Spore print is white
- Ecology is mycorrhizal
- Edibility is unknown

Amanita manginiana, also known as Mangin's false death cap, is a species of the genus Amanita originally described from Vietnam.

Amanita manginiana sensu W.F. Chiu is now known as Amanita caojizong.

== Description ==
The cap of Amanita manginiana is around 5–8 centimetres (2–3 inches) wide, chestnut brown, darker in the center, with the margin more pallid, silky (bearing fine hairs), convex then applanate, fleshy, and has a nonstriate margin. The gills are adnate and white. Short gills are present. The stipe is around 5–8 cm high, cylindrical, stuffed, white, becoming orangish-brown. The bulb is fleshy, globose to ovoid. The ring is membranous, white, superior, skirt-like. The volva is membranous, limbate, and fulvous-white. The spores measure 7–8 × 6 μm and are ovoid to subglobose. Its spores have a length of around 9.2–10.3 μm and a width of 7.5–7.8 μm.

== Taxonomy ==
This species is very poorly known. Originally described with type specimen from Vietnam in 1914 by Paul Auguste Hariot and Narcisse Théophile Patouillard, the type specimen is in very bad condition. The spores are nothing but amyloid rubble and the collected specimens are unfortunately, almost entirely useless.

== See also ==
- Amanita
- List of Amanita Species
