= Caloboletus panniformis =

Scientific classification
- Domain: Eukaryota
- Kingdom: Fungi
- Division: Basidiomycota
- Class: Agaricomycetes
- Order: Boletales
- Family: Boletaceae
- Genus: Caloboletus
- Species: C. panniformis

Binomial name
- Caloboletus panniformis (Taneyama & Har. Takah.) Vizzini (2014)

Synonyms
- Boletus panniformis Taneyama & Har. Takah. (2013)

Species of fungus

Caloboletus panniformis is a bolete fungus native to Honshu island in Japan, where it grows under conifers in subalpine regions. Until 2014, it was known as Boletus panniformis. Recent changes in the phylogenetic framework of the family Boletaceae prompted the transfer of this species, along with several other related boletes, including Caloboletus calopus, to the genus Caloboletus. It was first described scientifically in 2013 by Japanese botanist Haruki Takahashi and colleagues.
