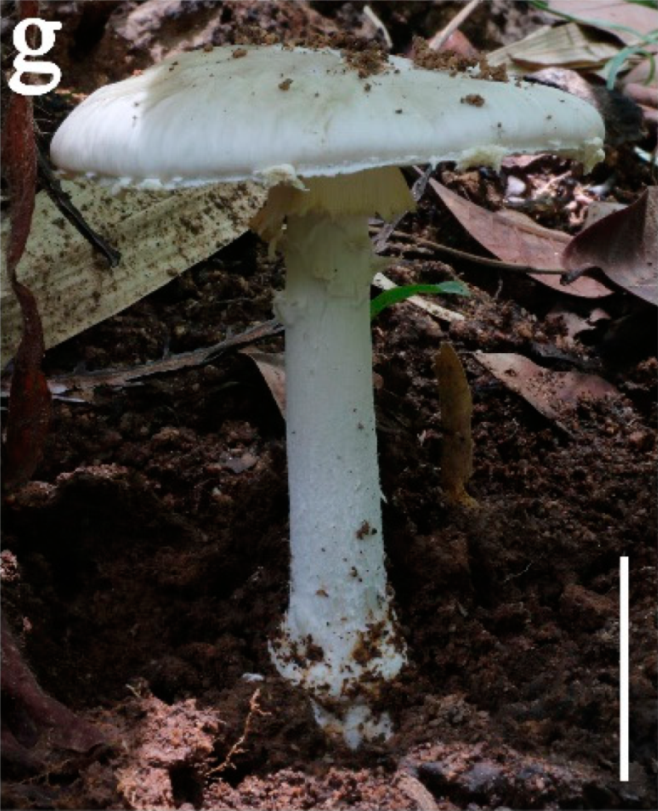

Scientific classification
- Kingdom: Fungi
- Division: Basidiomycota
- Class: Agaricomycetes
- Order: Agaricales
- Family: Amanitaceae
- Genus: Amanita
- Subgenus: Amanita subg. Amanitina
- Section: Amanita sect. Roanokenses
- Species: A. caojizong

Binomial name
- Amanita caojizong Zhu L. Yang, Y.Y. Cui & Q. Cai (2018)

Synonyms
- Amanita manginiana sensu W.F. Chiu

= Amanita caojizong =

Species of fungus

Amanita caojizong
- Mycological characteristics
- Gills on hymenium
- Cap is convex or flat
- Hymenium is free
- Stipe has a ring and volva
- Ecology is mycorrhizal
- Edibility is edible but not recommended

Amanita caojizong (formerly Amanita manginiana sensu W.F. Chiu) or Chiu's false death cap, is a mushroom of Amanitaceae found in East Asia and Mainland Southeast Asia.

It is known in Chinese as caojizong. (Note: Chinese: 草雞㙡 / 草雞樅 (trad.), 草鸡𭎂 / 草鸡枞 (simp.); pinyin: cǎojīzōng.)

== Taxonomy ==
This mushroom was first scientifically described by Wei-Fan Chiu in 1948 under the name of "Amanita manginiana". Noticing that this mushroom has some morphological disparities from the protologue and type illustration of A. manginiana, Yang (1997) called this mushroom "Amanita manginiana sensu W.F. Chiu". The mushroom was given an independent name, Amanita caojizong, in Cui et al. (2018).

== Description ==
Overall, the mushroom is medium or big in size, occasionally even larger. It does not have a distinct odor.

The cap is 5–15 centimetres (2–6 in) across, exceptionally up to 20 cm. Its shape is plano-convex to flat, sometimes centrally umbonate. The color is ranged being brownish gray, brown, gray to dark gray. When broken, the flesh is white and does not change color. The gills are white to cream-colored.

The stem is 9–15 cm (3 1/2–6 in) long and 0.5–3 cm (1/4–1 1/4 in) thick. It is white with a soft or stuffed center. It has a white annulus at the uppermost or almost uppermost position of the stem. It has a white volva.

== Habitat and distribution ==
It grows in forests of pines, broad-leaved trees or both Fagaceae and Pinaceae trees.

It is found in China, South Korea, Japan and Thailand.

== Edibility ==
This mushroom is edible. However, consumption is not recommended as this mushroom is visually similar to toxic Amanita species, such as A. pseudoporphyria.
