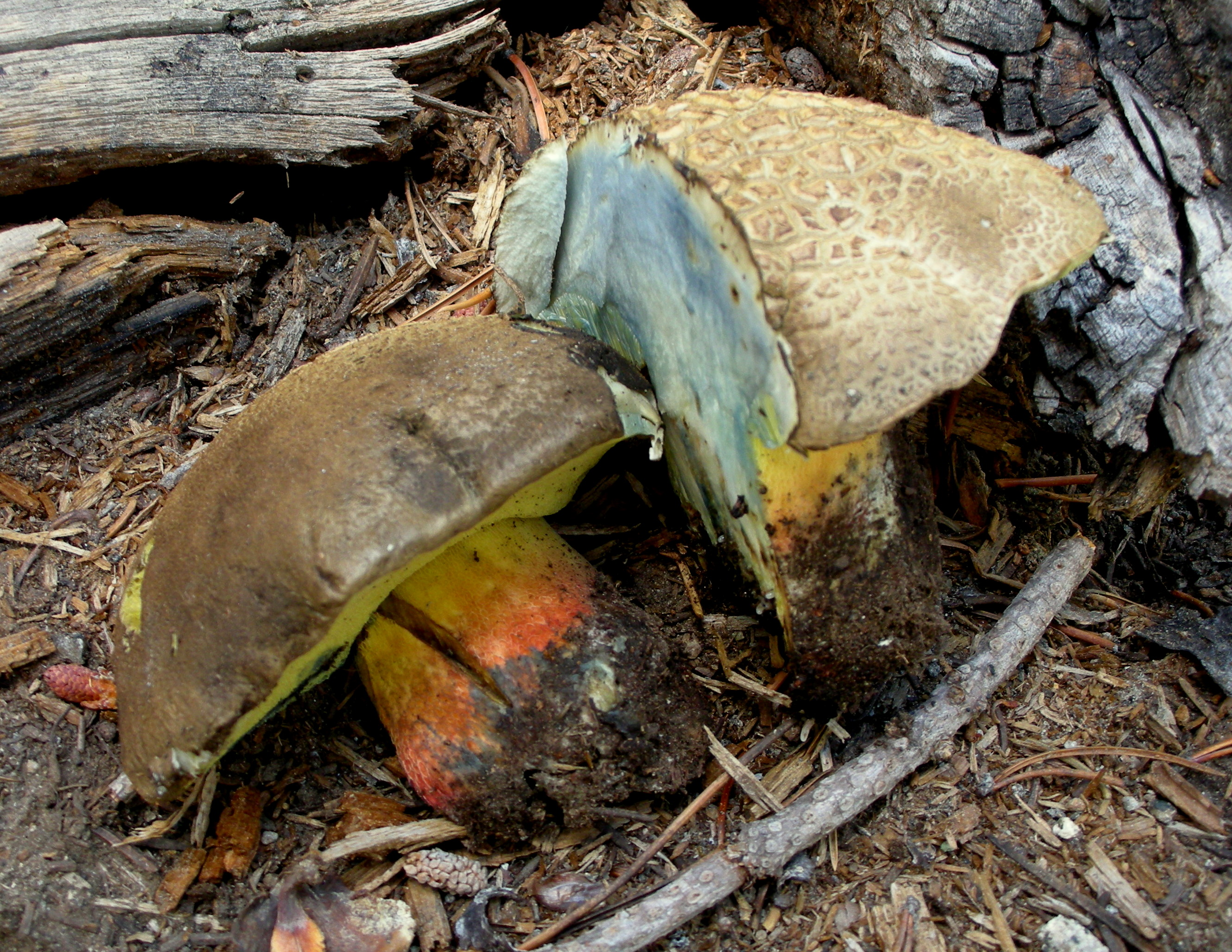

Scientific classification
- Domain: Eukaryota
- Kingdom: Fungi
- Division: Basidiomycota
- Class: Agaricomycetes
- Order: Boletales
- Family: Boletaceae
- Genus: Caloboletus
- Species: C. frustosus

Binomial name
- Caloboletus frustosus (Snell & E.A.Dick) D.Arora & J.L.Frank (2014)

Synonyms
- Boletus frustosus Snell & E.A.Dick (1941); Boletus calopus var. frustosus (Snell & E.A.Dick) O.K.Mill. & Watling (1968)

= Caloboletus frustosus =

Species of fungus

Caloboletus frustosus is a bolete fungus native to North America. Until 2014, it was known as Boletus frustosus. Recent changes in the phylogenetic framework of the family Boletaceae prompted the transfer of this species, along with several other related boletes, including Caloboletus calopus, to the genus Caloboletus. It was first described scientifically in 1941 by mycologists Wally Snell and Esther Dick.

== See also ==
- List of North American boletes
