= Caloboletus yunnanensis =

Scientific classification
- Kingdom: Fungi
- Division: Basidiomycota
- Class: Agaricomycetes
- Order: Boletales
- Family: Boletaceae
- Genus: Caloboletus
- Species: C. yunnanensis

Binomial name
- Caloboletus yunnanensis Kuan Zhao & Zhu L. Yang

Species of fungus

Caloboletus yunnanensis is a bolete fungus native to Yunnan province in China, where it grows under Pinus yunnanensis.
