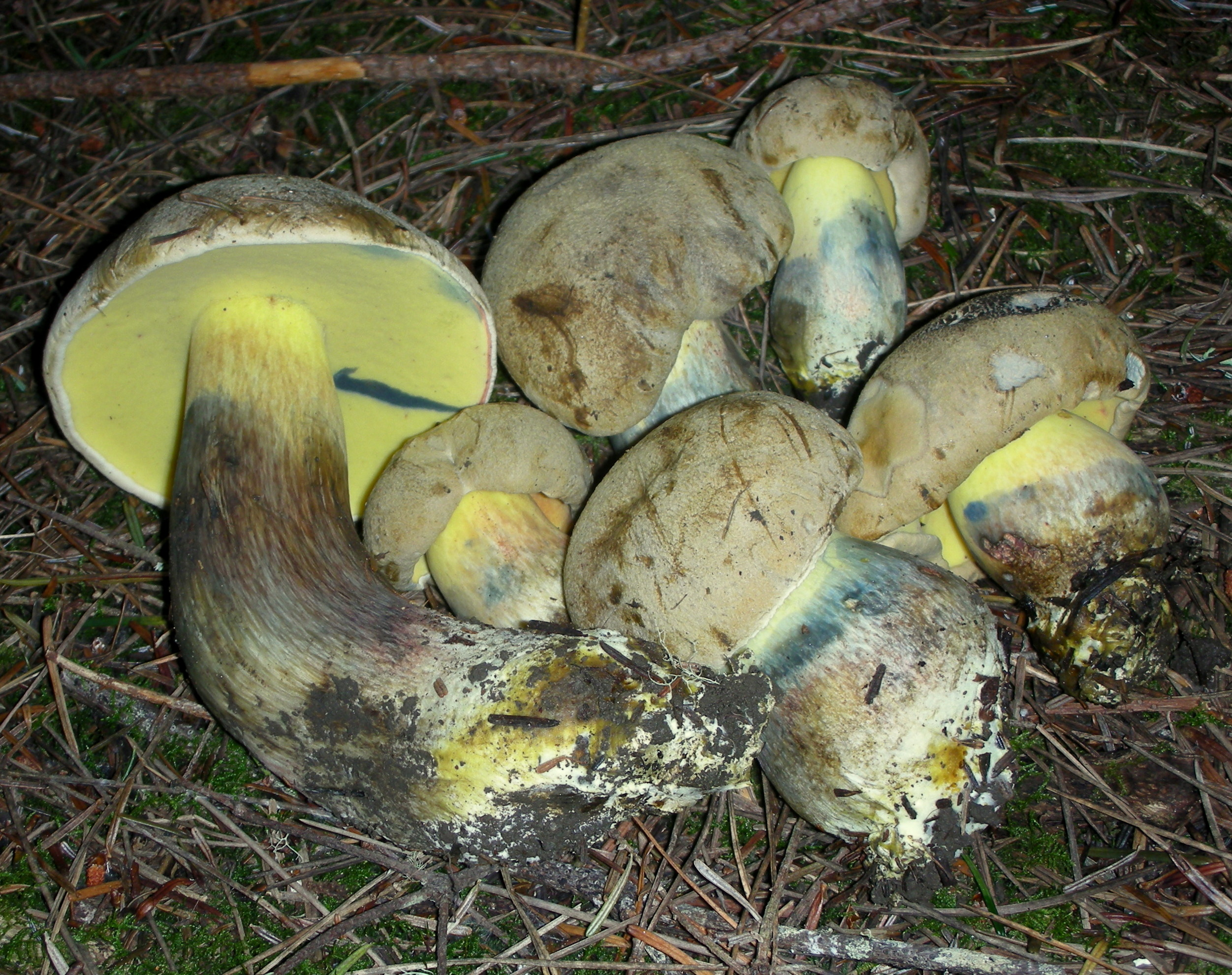

Scientific classification
- Domain: Eukaryota
- Kingdom: Fungi
- Division: Basidiomycota
- Class: Agaricomycetes
- Order: Boletales
- Family: Boletaceae
- Genus: Boletus
- Species: B. coniferarum

Binomial name
- Boletus coniferarum Lebedeva (1949)

= Boletus coniferarum =

Species of fungus

Boletus coniferarum, the conifer bolete, is a mushroom of the genus Boletus native to North America. The species is inedible due to its extremely bitter taste.

The semi-velvety cap is grayish and the yellow tubes stain dark blue. The stipe is yellowish, darkening in age, and sometimes larger near the base. The flesh is buff and stains blue.

Boletus frustosus is similar, but has reddish hues at the bottom of the stipe, as does Cyanoboletus pulverulentus, which stains a greener hue than B. coniferarum and tastes mild.

== See also ==
- List of Boletus species
- List of North American boletes
