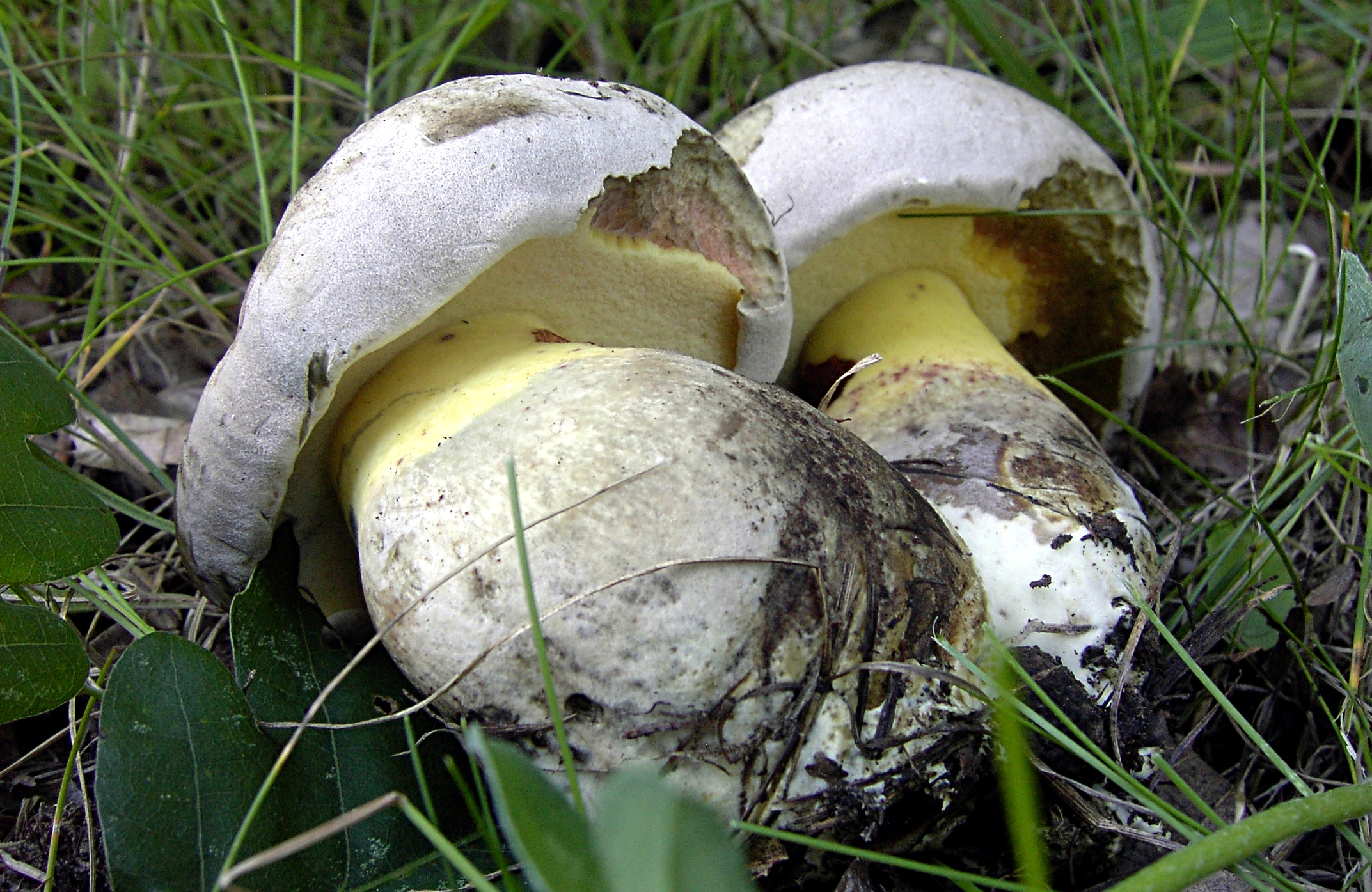

Scientific classification
- Domain: Eukaryota
- Kingdom: Fungi
- Division: Basidiomycota
- Class: Agaricomycetes
- Order: Boletales
- Family: Boletaceae
- Genus: Caloboletus
- Species: C. radicans

Binomial name
- Caloboletus radicans (Pers.) Vizzini (2014)

Synonyms
- Boletus radicans Pers. (1800); Versipellis radicans (Pers.) Quél. (1886); Suillus radicans (Pers.) Kuntze (1898); Boletus albidus Roques (1841)

= Caloboletus radicans =

Caloboletus radicans Mycological characteristics
- Pores on hymenium
- Cap is convex
- Hymenium is adnexed
- Stipe is bare
- Spore print is olive-brown
- Ecology is mycorrhizal
- Edibility is poisonous

Caloboletus radicans, also known as the rooting bolete or whitish bolete, is a large ectomycorrhizal fungus found in Europe under broad-leaved trees, fruiting during the summer and autumn months. It has a pale buff or greyish-white cap, yellow pores and a stout stipe, and stains intensely blue when handled or cut. Bitter and inedible, it can cause severe vomiting and diarrhoea if eaten. Until 2014 it was placed in genus Boletus, but has since been transferred to the new genus Caloboletus based on molecular phylogenetic data.

== Taxonomy ==
The fungus was first described by the pioneering South African-born mycologist Christian Hendrik Persoon in 1801, who placed it in genus Boletus. Its specific epithet is derived from the Latin radic- 'root', referring to its rooting stipe. The name Boletus albidus is a later synonym. In 2014, the bolete was transferred to the new genus Caloboletus by Italian mycologist Alfredo Vizzini, based on phylogenetic data.

It is often known by the common name of whitish bolete.

== Description ==
The cap diameter ranges from 7.5 to 30 cm (3.0 to 11.8 in) across, and is usually dirty white, greyish-white, ivory white or buff, downy at first, but often finely cracking at the centre as the cap expands. The stipe is 5–8 cm (2.0–3.1 in) tall by 3–4 cm (1.2–1.6 in) wide, usually swollen or barrel-shaped when young, but soon becoming elongated and more or less fusiform, with a tapering base usually rooting into the substrate. The apex is typically bright lemon yellow, but fading below. There is a light straw-coloured reticulation at the upper part of the stipe, though in rare occasions this may be indistinct. The flesh is pale yellow, somewhat paler whitish to straw-coloured in the cap, instantly turning dark blue when cut. The pores are lemon yellow, small and rounded, bruising blue when touched or injured. The spore print is olivaceous walnut-brown.

Microscopically, it has ellipsoid to fusiform spores measuring 11.5–14 × 4–5.5 μm. The hyphal structure of the cap is a trichodermium of interwoven septate hyphae, often finely incrusted.

== Distribution and habitat ==
Fruiting during warm spells in the summer and early autumn, Caloboletus radicans is ecologically versatile. It forms ectomycorrhizal associations with a wide range of broad-leaved trees, including oaks (Quercus), beech (Fagus), hornbeam (Carpinus), chestnut (Castanea) and lime (Tilia). It grows on both calcareous (chalk) and acidic soils in southern England (where it is common) and across much of Europe.

== Edibility ==
The mushroom is inedible due to its intense bitterness. A 2012 study on mushroom poisoning in Switzerland by Katharina M. Schenk-Jaeger and colleagues, found Caloboletus radicans to have caused severe gastrointestinal symptoms to those who had consumed it, including recurrent vomiting and bloody diarrhoea.
