= Wally Snell =

American baseball player and mycologist (1889–1980)

- Catcher
- Born: May 19, 1889; West Bridgewater, Massachusetts, U.S.
- Died: July 23, 1980 (aged 91); Providence, Rhode Island, U.S.
- Batted: Switch Threw: Right

MLB debut
- August 1, 1913, for the Boston Red Sox

Last MLB appearance
- October 4, 1913, for the Boston Red Sox

MLB statistics
- Batting average: .250
- Home runs: 0
- Runs batted in: 0

Teams
- Boston Red Sox (1913)

Walter Henry "Doc" Snell (May 19, 1889 – July 23, 1980) was an American baseball player and coach, college athletics administrator, and mycologist. He played briefly as a catcher in Major League Baseball with the Boston Red Sox during the 1913 season. Following his playing career, he became a successful mycologist who worked primarily at Brown University. Snell also coached the baseball team at Brown from 1922 to 1927 and served as the school's athletic director from 1943 to 1946.

== Early life and college career ==
Snell attended Brockton High School in Brockton, Massachusetts and Phillips Academy in Andover, Massachusetts. At Brown, Snell earned varsity letters in football, baseball, track, and swimming. He played a significant role on the 1911 Brown Bears football team, which defeated Yale. Snell was elected captain of Brown's baseball team for the 1913 season.

== Professional baseball career ==
In 1913, he was signed by the Philadelphia Athletics owner Connie Mack, but broke his hand in a game at Brown and was dealt to the Red Sox.

In a six-game career, Snell was a .250 hitter (3-for-12) with one run and one stolen base without RBI or home runs. In two catching appearances, he committed one error in 13 chances accepted for a .923 fielding percentage. Snell hit a single in his first major league at bat off Cleveland Naps pitcher Nick Cullop on August 1, 1913. He was one of five catchers the Red Sox used during the 1913 season.

Following his majors career, Snell continued to play some minor league baseball while studying for his master's degree, playing in 1914 and 1915 in the International League with the Toronto Maple Leafs (1914) and Rochester Hustlers (1915), and for the Manchester team of the New England League (1915), becoming a first baseman in his last baseball season.

== Academic and coaching career ==
After receiving his master's degree from Brown in 1915, Snell earned a Ph.D. degree in botany. In 1916, he was hired at Milton College in Milton, Wisconsin to coach football and other sports. In the summer of 1923, he managed the Hyannis town team in the Cape Cod Baseball League. Before teaching at Brown, Snell worked for the Bureau of Plant Industry between 1918 and 1920. At Brown, Snell served as an assistant professor from 1920 to 1921, an associate professor from 1921 to 1942, the Stephen T. Olney Professor of Botany from 1942 to 1945, and professor of natural history from 1945 to 1959. He focused primarily in mycology and discovered several forms of mushrooms in the Northeastern United States, which were previously thought not to grow there, and published multiple mycological works. In 1970, he and his wife co-wrote The Boleti of Northeastern North America which was the culmination of his life's work; it contained hundreds of his watercolor illustrations of fungi.

Fungus species that were named after him include Leccinum snellii and Tylopilus snellii.

== Personal life ==
Snell married twice. His second wife, Esther A. Dick (later Esther Dick Snell), was a fellow mycologist who co-wrote A Glossary of the Fungi with him, among other works.

Snell died at the age of 91 in Providence, Rhode Island.
