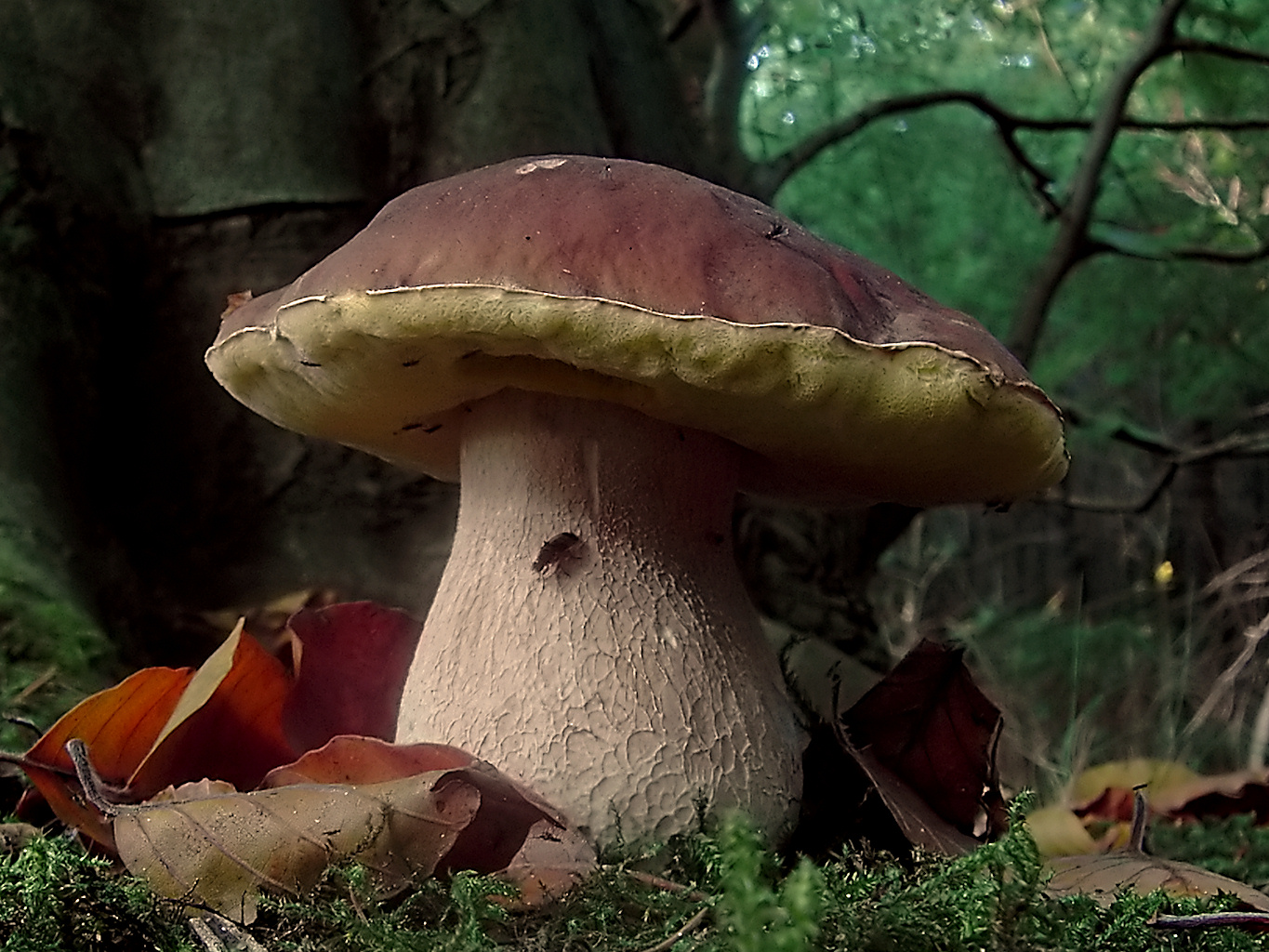
- Boletus edulis

Scientific classification
- Kingdom: Fungi
- Division: Basidiomycota
- Class: Agaricomycetes
- Order: Boletales
- Suborder: Boletineae

Families
- Boletaceae; Paxillaceae

= Boletineae =

Suborder of fungi

The Boletineae are a suborder of the fungal order Boletales. Families in the Boletineae include the Boletaceae and the Paxillaceae.

== Taxa ==
- Paxillaceae
  - Alpova
  - Austrogaster
  - Gyrodon
  - Hydnomerulius
  - Meiorganum
  - Melanogaster
  - Paragyrodon
  - Paxillus
- Boletaceae
  - Afroboletus
  - Aureoboletus
  - Australopilus
  - Austroboletus
  - Boletellus
  - Boletochaete
  - Boletus
  - Borofutus
  - Bothia
  - Chalciporus
  - Chamonixia
  - Corneroboletus
  - Fistulinella
  - Gastroboletus
  - Gymnogaster
  - Harrya
  - Heimioporus
  - Heliogaster
  - Hemileccinum
  - Leccinellum
  - Leccinum
  - Mycoamaranthus
  - Octaviania
  - Phylloboletellus
  - Phylloporus
  - Porphyrellus
  - Pseudoboletus
  - Pulveroboletus
  - Retiboletus
  - Rhodactina
  - Rossbeevera
  - Royoungia
  - Sinoboletus
  - Solioccasus
  - Spongiforma
  - Strobilomyces
  - Sutorius
  - Tubosaeta
  - Tylopilus
  - Veloporphyrellus
  - Xanthoconium
  - Xerocomellus
  - Xerocomus
  - Zangia
