= Parvixerocomus pseudoaokii =

Scientific classification
- Kingdom: Fungi
- Division: Basidiomycota
- Class: Agaricomycetes
- Order: Boletales
- Family: Boletaceae
- Genus: Parvixerocomus
- Species: P. pseudoaokii

Binomial name
- Parvixerocomus pseudoaokii (Hongo) G.Wu, N.K.Zeng & Zhu L.Yang (2015)

Species of fungus

Parvixerocomus pseudoaokii is a species of bolete fungus in the family Boletaceae, and the type species of the genus Parvixerocomus. It was described by Chinese mycologists Gang Wu and Zhu L. Yang in 2015. It is found only in southwestern, southeastern and southern China, where it grows in subtropical forests with trees of the family Fagaceae, and in mixed forests with Fagaceae and Chinese red pine (Pinus massoniana). Fruitbodies of the fungus are small, with convex to flattened caps typically measuring 0.8–3 cm (0.3–1.2 in) in diameter. All parts of the bolete stain blue when cut or injured.
