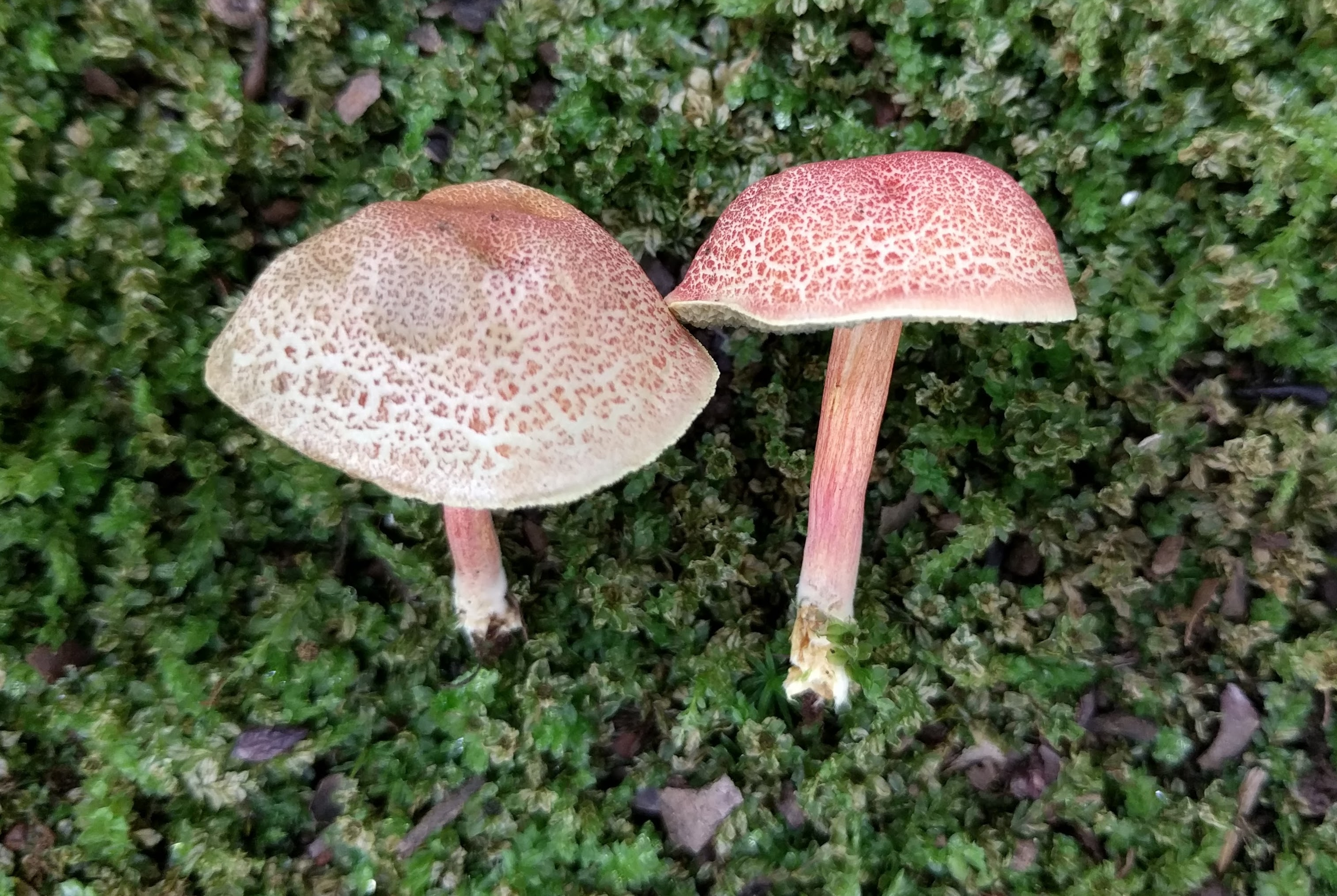

Scientific classification
- Kingdom: Fungi
- Division: Basidiomycota
- Class: Agaricomycetes
- Order: Boletales
- Family: Boletaceae
- Genus: Parvixerocomus
- Species: P. aokii

Binomial name
- Parvixerocomus aokii (Hongo) G.Wu, N.K.Zeng & Zhu L.Yang (2015)

Synonyms
- Boletus aokii Hongo (1984)

= Parvixerocomus aokii =

Species of fungus

Parvixerocomus aokii is a species of bolete fungus in the family Boletaceae. It was originally described by Japanese mycologist Tsuguo Hongo in 1984 as a species of Boletus. Chinese mycologists Gang Wu, Nian-Kai Zeng, and Zhu L. Yang transferred it to Parvixerocomus in 2015. It is known only from China and Japan, where it grows in tropical and subtropical forests with trees of the family Fagaceae.
