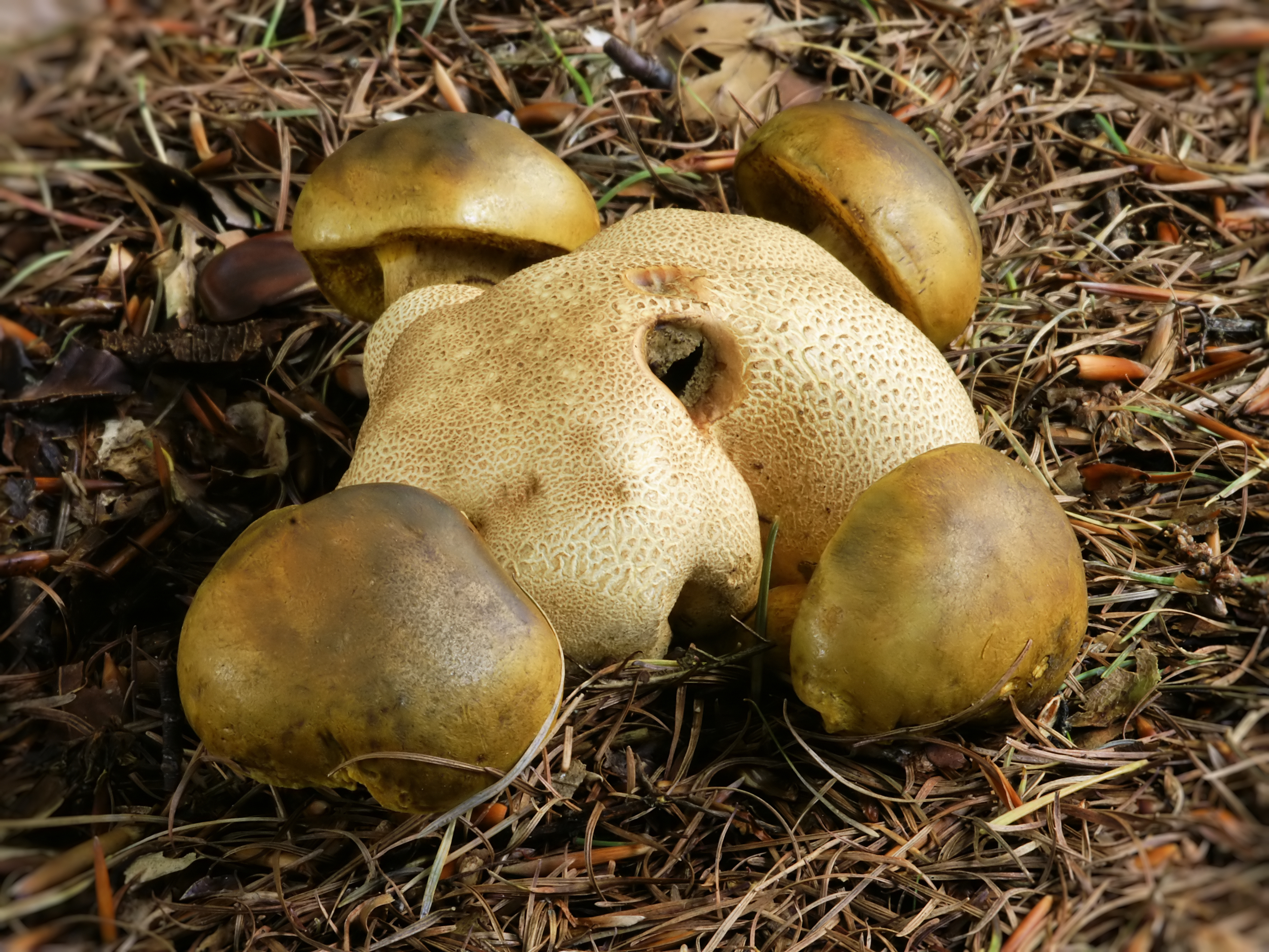
- P. parasiticus

Scientific classification
- Kingdom: Fungi
- Division: Basidiomycota
- Class: Agaricomycetes
- Order: Boletales
- Family: Boletaceae
- Genus: Pseudoboletus
- Species: P. parasiticus

Binomial name
- Pseudoboletus parasiticus (Bull.) Šutara, 1790

Synonyms
- Xerocomus parasiticus (Bull.) Quél., 1887

= Pseudoboletus parasiticus =

Species of fungus

Pseudoboletus parasiticus
- Mycological characteristics
- Pores on hymenium
- Cap is flat
- Stipe is bare
- Spore print is yellow to olive
- Ecology is parasitic
- Edibility is edible but not recommended

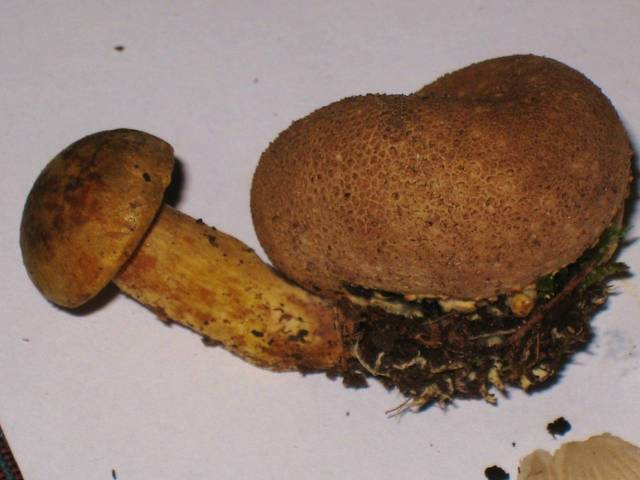
Pseudoboletus parasiticus

Pseudoboletus parasiticus, previously known as Boletus parasiticus and Xerocomus parasiticus, and commonly known as the parasitic bolete, is a rare bolete mushroom found on Scleroderma citrinum earthballs in North America.

== Taxonomy ==
Pseudoboletus parasiticus is one of the earliest-diverging lineages of the Boletaceae, after the clade comprising Chalciporus and Buchwaldoboletus.

== Description ==
The cap is hemispherical when young, later flat, yellowish brown or darker and up to 6 centimetres (2 1/4 in) wide. The yellow stem is 3–7 cm (1–3 in) tall and 6–15 millimetres (1/4–5/8 in) thick. The flesh is pale yellow and the spore print is olive brown.

== Habitat and distribution ==
It can be found growing on Scleroderma citrinum earthballs in eastern North America from July to September.

== Edibility ==
While edible, it is not recommended to do so, due to concerns about being poisoned by its host, the common earthball, which is poisonous.

== See also ==
- List of Boletus species
- List of North American boletes
