= Rugiboletus andinus =

Scientific classification
- Domain: Eukaryota
- Kingdom: Fungi
- Division: Basidiomycota
- Class: Agaricomycetes
- Order: Boletales
- Family: Boletaceae
- Genus: Rugiboletus
- Species: R. andinus

Binomial name
- Rugiboletus andinus (Halling) Halling & B. Ortiz (2020)

Synonyms
- Leccinum andinum Halling (1989)

Species of fungus

Rugiboletus andinus is a species of bolete fungus in the family Boletaceae.

== Distribution ==
Found in Costa Rica and Colombia, it was described as new to science in 1989 by mycologist Roy Halling.
