= Rossbeevera eucyanea =

Scientific classification
- Kingdom: Fungi
- Division: Basidiomycota
- Class: Agaricomycetes
- Order: Boletales
- Family: Boletaceae
- Genus: Rossbeevera
- Species: R. eucyanea

Binomial name
- Rossbeevera eucyanea Iqbal Hosen & T.H. Li (2019)

Species of fungus

Rossbeevera eucyanea is a species of the fungal family Boletaceae. This species was described from Japan.
