= Rhodactina himalayensis =

Scientific classification
- Domain: Eukaryota
- Kingdom: Fungi
- Division: Basidiomycota
- Class: Agaricomycetes
- Order: Boletales
- Family: Boletaceae
- Genus: Rhodactina
- Species: R. himalayensis

Binomial name
- Rhodactina himalayensis Pegler & T.W.K. Young (1989)

Species of fungus

Rhodactina himalayensis is a species of secotioid fungus in the family Boletaceae, and the type species of genus Rhodactina. Originally described from Uttar Pradesh in 1989, it is also found in Dipterocarpaceae-dominated forests in Chang Mai, northern Thailand. It grows in association with roots of Shorea robusta.
