= Rhodactina incarnata =

Scientific classification
- Domain: Eukaryota
- Kingdom: Fungi
- Division: Basidiomycota
- Class: Agaricomycetes
- Order: Boletales
- Family: Boletaceae
- Genus: Rhodactina
- Species: R. incarnata

Binomial name
- Rhodactina incarnata Zhu L.Yang, Trappe & Lumyong (2006)

Species of fungus

Rhodactina incarnata is a species of secotioid fungus in the family Boletaceae. It is found in the sandy soil of dry, Dipterocarpaceae-dominated forests in Chiang Mai, northern Thailand. The fungus was described as new to science in 2006, becoming the second species in genus Rhodactina. The specific epithet incarnata, derived from the Latin for "flesh-colored," refers to the fruitbody color.
