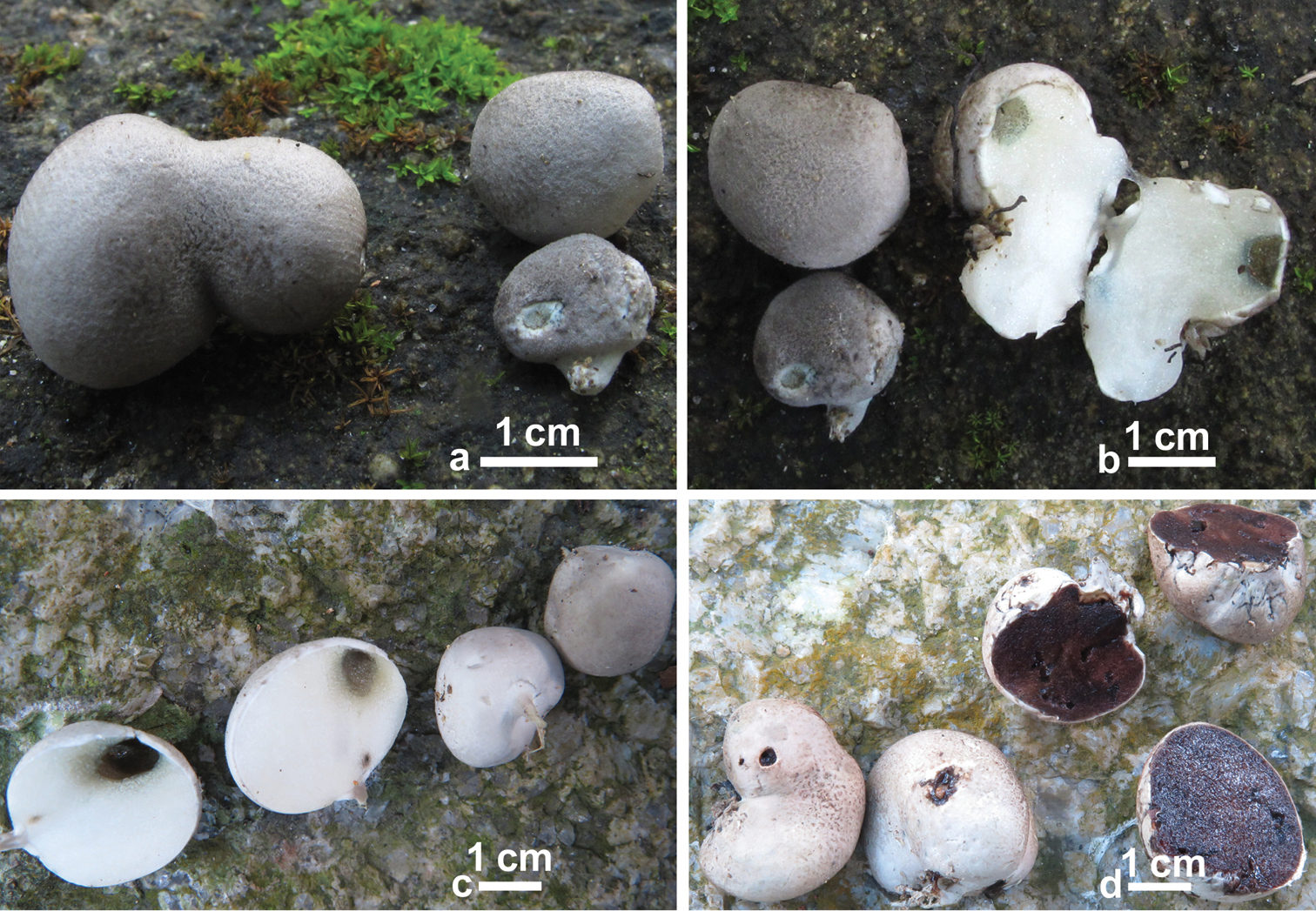

Scientific classification
- Kingdom: Fungi
- Division: Basidiomycota
- Class: Agaricomycetes
- Order: Boletales
- Family: Boletaceae
- Genus: Rossbeevera
- Species: R. griseobrunnea

Binomial name
- Rossbeevera griseobrunnea Iqbal Hosen & T.H. Li (2019)

= Rossbeevera griseobrunnea =

Species of fungus

Rossbeevera griseobrunnea is a species of the fungal family Boletaceae. This species was first described in April 2019 from southern China.
