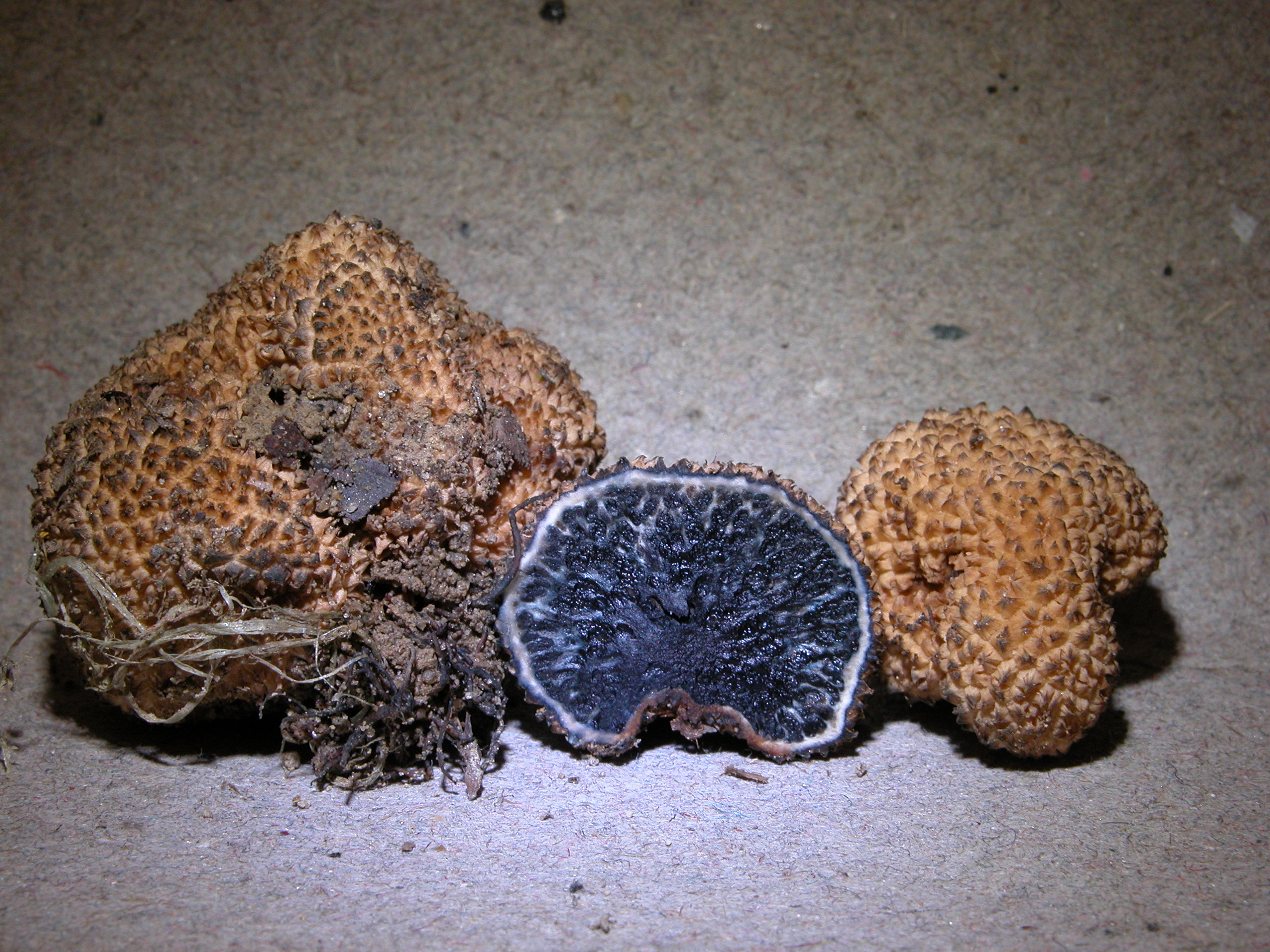
- Collected in Malaysia

Conservation status
- Vulnerable (IUCN 3.1)

Scientific classification
- Kingdom: Fungi
- Division: Basidiomycota
- Class: Agaricomycetes
- Order: Boletales
- Family: Boletaceae
- Genus: Durianella; A.W.Wilson & Manfr.Binder (2008)
- Species: D. echinulata

Binomial name
- Durianella echinulata (Corner & Hawker) Desjardin, A.W.Wilson & Manfr.Binder

Synonyms
- Hydnangium echinulatum Corner & Hawker (1953)

= Durianella =

Genus of fungi

Durianella is a genus of atypical, superficially puffball-like bolete. It contains the single species Durianella echinulata, found in Peninsular Malaysia and Borneo.

== Taxonomy ==
The fungus was originally collected in a jungle in Kemaman, Trengganu (Malaysia), on 24 June 1932, where it was found growing on soil buried in leaves at a river's edge. It was described as Hydnangium echinulatum by E.J.H. Corner and Lilian Hawker in 1953, although they noted that no other known species of Hydnangium had a spiny peridium. The species was known only from a single specimen until recollected in 2005 and 2006. Genetic analysis suggested it was a member of the Boletales suborder Boletineae, and not related to the genus Hydnangium of the Agaricales. The blue-staining suggested a relationship with Gyroporus, while the structure of the fruit bodies suggested an affinity with Pisolithus.

The genus name Durianella refers to the fruit bodies' resemblance to a small durian.

== Description ==
The fungus's fruit bodies are irregular and globular, measuring 1.7–3.5 cm (0.67–1.38 in) wide and 1.2–2.3 cm (0.47–0.91 in) high, and are covered in 1 mm-high tan conical warts. Under the surface is a white 1–2 mm thick peridium which turns dark blue when cut – the superficial 0.5–1 mm doing so immediately, while the remainder takes 1–2 minutes to do so. The gelatinous gleba is in globules throughout the interior and also stains blue when cut. It is white when young and becomes tinted with orange with age. The white fibrous tissue surrounding the gleba lobules also turns blue on cutting. The fruit body has a well-developed columnella (a sterile column of tissue extending from the base of the gleba into the fruit body). It is egg-shaped, gelatinous, measuring 5–15 mm thick by 5–10 mm long. When injured, it stains grayish blue in 1–2 minutes. On the exterior of the fruit body, it is attached to the soil by orange rhizomorphs.

The spores are spherical or nearly so, and have a thick wall measuring 0.5–1.5 μm. The spore surface is covered with narrow spines up to 3 μm long; spore dimensions are 9–10 by 8.5–10 um (without spines) or 12–15 by 11.5–13.5 μm (with spines). The basidia (spore-bearing cells) are club-shaped, measuring 24–32 by 9–11.5 μm, and have two or four sterigmata up to 13 μm long. Clamp connections are absent from the hyphae.

== Habitat and distribution ==
Durianella echinulata is found under dipterocarp trees of the genus Shorea in Peninsular Malaysia and Borneo. It fruits on the ground singly, scattered, or in small clusters.
