= Ross Beever =

New Zealand mycologist and geneticist (1946–2010)

Ross Ewen Beever
- Born: 3 January 1946; Te Kūiti, New Zealand
- Died: 3 June 2010 (aged 64); Auckland, New Zealand
- Education: University of Auckland; University of Leeds
- Scientific career
- Theses: Growth of fungi on potato extract media (1968); Genetic and biochemical studies of phosphoenolpyruvate carboxykinase in Neurospora crassa. (1972)

Ross Ewen Beever (3 January 1946 – 3 June 2010) was a New Zealand geneticist and mycologist.

== Academic career ==
Born in Te Kūiti, Beever completed a MSc at Auckland University with a thesis Growth of fungi on potato extract media and a PhD at Leeds entitled Genetic and biochemical studies of phosphoenolpyruvate carboxykinase in Neurospora crassa.

On his return to New Zealand he worked for DSIR and later Landcare Research, principally on Botrytis cinerea and other important plant diseases including Phytoplasma australiense, responsible for cabbage tree mortality, and Phytophthora species responsible for kauri dieback.

He was elected a Fellow of the Royal Society of New Zealand in 2004.

Beever died in Auckland in 2010. The Ross Beever Memorial Mycological Award was established by the New Zealand Mycological Society in 2014. Fungus taxa named in his honour include the species Colletotrichum beeveri and Cortinarius beeverorum, and the genus Rossbeevera.
