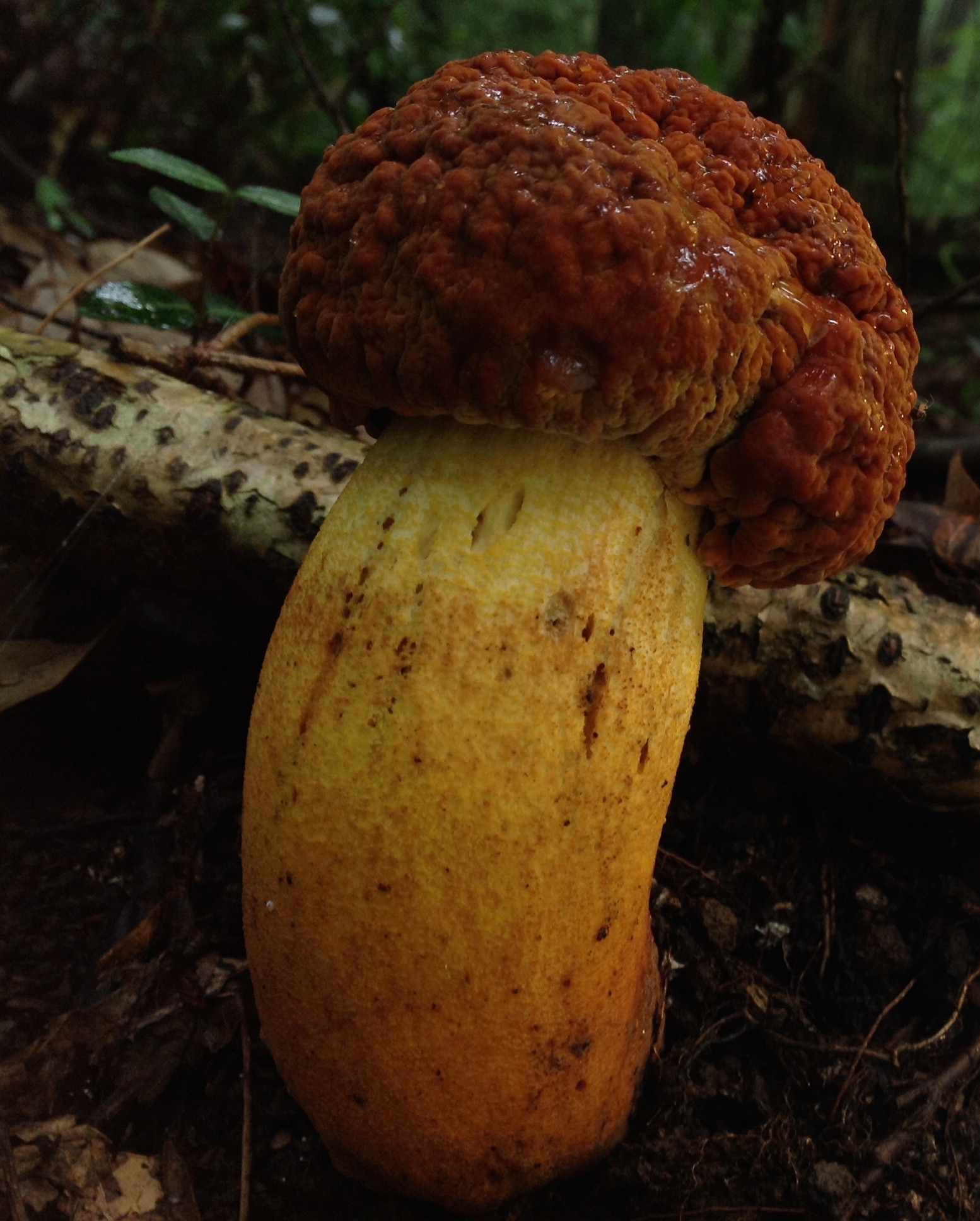

Scientific classification
- Domain: Eukaryota
- Kingdom: Fungi
- Division: Basidiomycota
- Class: Agaricomycetes
- Order: Boletales
- Family: Boletaceae
- Genus: Rugiboletus; G.Wu & Zhu L.Yang (2015)

Type species
- Rugiboletus extremiorientalis (Lar.N. Vassiljeva) G.Wu & Zhu L.Yang (2015)

Species
- R. andinus; R. brunneiporus; R. extremiorientalis

= Rugiboletus =

Genus of fungi

Rugiboletus is a genus of fungi in the family Boletaceae. It was circumscribed by Chinese mycologists Gang Wu and Zhu L. Yang in 2015 with the alpine species Rugiboletus extremiorientalis (previously Krombholzia extremiorientalis) from eastern Asia as the type species. Rugiboletus brunneiporus of southern China and India was also described that same year. The erection of Rugiboletus follows recent molecular studies that outlined a new phylogenetic framework for the Boletaceae. The generic name—derived from the Latin stem rugi- ("wrinkled") and Boletus as the mushroom caps are wrinkled and furrowed, unlike any other boletes.
