= Zangia (fungus) =

Scientific classification
- Kingdom: Fungi
- Division: Basidiomycota
- Class: Agaricomycetes
- Order: Boletales
- Family: Boletaceae
- Genus: Zangia; Y.C.Li & Zhu L.Yang (2011)

Type species
- Zangia roseola (W.F.Chiu) Y.C.Li & Zhu L.Yang (2011)

Species
- Z. chlorinosma Z. citrina Z. erythrocephala Z. olivacea Z. olivaceobrunnea Z. roseola

Genus of fungi

Zangia is a genus of bolete fungi in the family Boletaceae. The genus, circumscribed in 2011, contains six species found in China. Zangia species grow in forests dominated by Fagaceae (beeches and oaks) mixed with Pinaceae (pines).

== Taxonomy ==
Studying pink-pored boletes from China, mycologists Yan Chun Li, Bang Feng, and Zhu L. Yang showed using molecular phylogenetic analysis that several species–some still undescribed–were part of a unique genetic lineage distinct from other Boletaceae genera. Two species were transferred from other genera—Zangia chlorinosma from Tylopilus, and the type species, Zangia roseola, previously considered Boletus or Tylopilus. Four species were described as new. The sister taxon to the genus is the truffle-like Royoungia.

The generic epithet honors mycologist Mu Zang, known for his research on the Boletales of China.

== Description ==
Zangia is distinguished from other Boletaceae genera by the following features: a wrinkled cap, a pinkish to pink pore surface on the cap underside, a pink to pinkish brown spore print, pink scabrous small scales (squamules) on the stipe, a chrome-yellow to golden yellow stipe base, and chrome-yellow to golden yellow mycelia on the base of the stipe. In some species, there are bluish color changes in the stipe. Microscopic features include an ixohyphoepithelium cap cuticle, and smooth spores.

Species in Zangia generally resemble those in the subgenus Roseoscabra of genus Tylopilus. The type species of Roseoscabra, Tylopilus chromapes, was moved to the new genus Harrya in 2012.

== Distribution and habitat ==
The members of the genus are to date only known from southern, southeastern and southwestern China, and appear to be associated with forests composed mainly of trees of the family Fagaceae with some from the family Pinaceae.

== Species ==
As accepted by Species Fungorum;

Image	Scientific name	Taxon author	Year	Distribution
	Zangia chlorinosma	(Wolfe & Bougher) Y.C. Li & Zhu L. Yang	2011	China (Yunnan)
	Zangia citrina	Y.C. Li & Zhu L. Yang	2011	China (Fujian)
	Zangia erythrocephala	Y.C. Li & Zhu L. Yang	2011	China (Yunnan)
	Zangia olivacea	Y.C. Li & Zhu L. Yang	2011	China (Yunnan)
	Zangia olivaceobrunnea	Y.C. Li & Zhu L. Yang	2011	China (Yunnan)
	Zangia roseola	(W.F. Chiu) Y.C. Li & Zhu L. Yang	2011	China (Yunnan)
