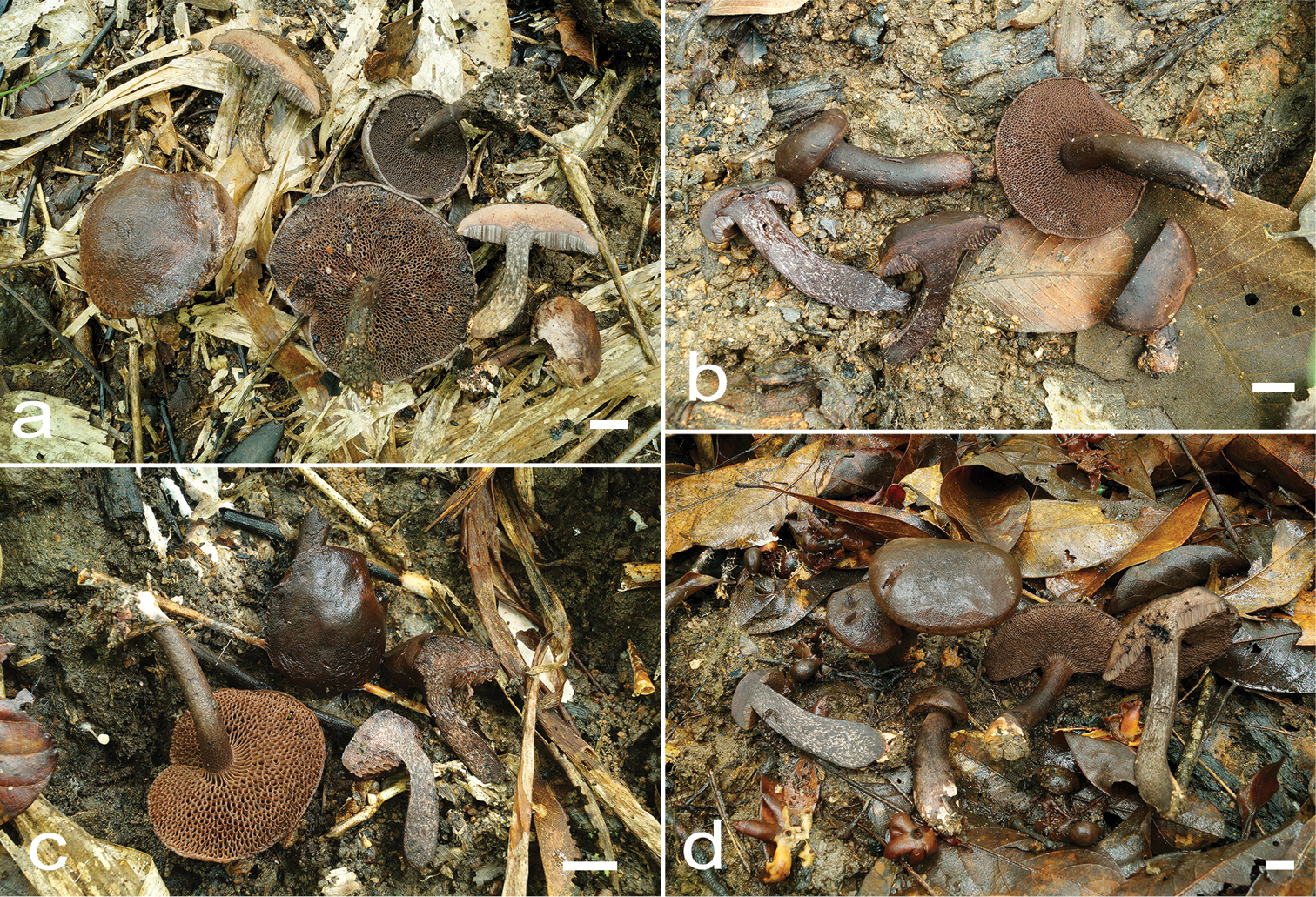
- a) C. pallidicarneus, b–d) C. tenebrosus

Scientific classification
- Kingdom: Fungi
- Division: Basidiomycota
- Class: Agaricomycetes
- Order: Boletales
- Family: Boletaceae
- Genus: Cacaoporus; Vadthanarat, Raspé & Lumyong (2019)

Type species
- Cacaoporus tenebrosus Vadthanarat, Raspé & Lumyong (2019)

= Cacaoporus =

Genus of fungi

Cacaoporus is a genus of poroid fungi within the family Boletaceae, named after its characteristic chocolate brown tubes.
