= Phyllobolites =

Scientific classification
- Kingdom: Fungi
- Division: Basidiomycota
- Class: Agaricomycetes
- Order: Boletales
- Family: Boletaceae
- Genus: Phyllobolites; Singer (1942)

Type species
- Phyllobolites miniatus Singer (1942)

Genus of fungi

Phyllobolites is a genus of fungi in the family Boletaceae. The genus is monotypic, containing the single species Phyllobolites miniatus, found in tropical South America.
