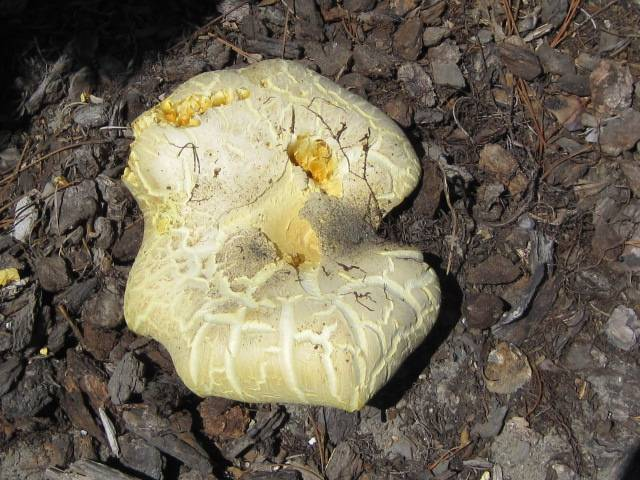

Scientific classification
- Kingdom: Fungi
- Division: Basidiomycota
- Class: Agaricomycetes
- Order: Boletales
- Family: Boletaceae
- Genus: Buchwaldoboletus
- Species: B. sphaerocephalus

Binomial name
- Buchwaldoboletus sphaerocephalus (Barla) Watling & T. H. Li, 2004

Synonyms
- Pulveroboletus sphaerocephalus

= Buchwaldoboletus sphaerocephalus =

Species of fungus

Buchwaldoboletus sphaerocephalus is a species of bolete fungus in the family Boletaceae. It is native to Europe, North America and Southwest Australia.

== Taxonomy ==
Originally described by Jean-Baptiste Barla as Boletus sphaerocephalus in 1859, it was given its current name by Roy Watling & Tai Hui Li in 2004.

== Description ==
The cap is convex, glabrous, silky and tomentose, viscid when wet. Its color is yellow to yellow-fulvus. It reaches 5–15 centimetres (2–6 in) wide. The pores are small, tubes short, and adnate ventricose. The context is yellow, bluing when bruised. The stipe is fleshy, ventricose, and there is a yellow mycelium at the stipe base; it reaches 3–12 cm (1 1/4–4 3/4 in) tall and 2–5 cm (3/4–2 in) wide.

Spores are ovoid, pale ochraceous and measure 5.5–7.2 by 3.3–4.5 μm. The spore print is brown.

=== Similar species ===
It resembles B. orovillus, B. hemichrysus and B. lignicola.

== Distribution and ecology ==
Buchwaldoboletus sphaerocephalus has been recorded in Europe, North America (from August to October) and Southwest Australia, growing in clusters on sawdust of pines, often in enclosed areas.
