= Setogyroporus =

Conservation status
- Data Deficient (IUCN 3.1)

Scientific classification
- Kingdom: Fungi
- Division: Basidiomycota
- Class: Agaricomycetes
- Order: Boletales
- Family: Boletaceae
- Genus: Setogyroporus; Heinem. & Rammeloo
- Species: S. verus

Binomial name
- Setogyroporus verus Heinem. & Rammeloo

Genus of fungi

Setogyroporus is a monotypic fungal genus in the family Boletaceae, containing the single species Setogyroporus verus.
