= Neoboletus venenatus =

Scientific classification
- Kingdom: Fungi
- Division: Basidiomycota
- Class: Agaricomycetes
- Order: Boletales
- Family: Boletaceae
- Genus: Neoboletus
- Species: N. venenatus

Binomial name
- Neoboletus venenatus (Nagas) G. Wu & Zhu L. Yang

Synonyms
- Boletus venenatus Nagas, 1996; Hemileccinum venenatus (Nagas)

Species of fungus

Neoboletus venenatus, known until 2015 as Boletus venenatus, is a species of bolete fungus in the family Boletaceae native to Japan and China. It was transferred to the new genus Neoboletus by Chinese mycologists Gang Wu and Zhu L. Yang in 2015.

== Taxonomy ==
Japanese mycologist Eiji Nagasawa described this species as Boletus venenatus in 1995. It is known in Japan as dokuyamadori or tahei-iguchi.

== Description ==
The cap is dome-shaped initially, then convex to cushion-shaped, before flattening out in maturity, attaining diameters of 7–26 cm (2.8–10.2 in), and can be various shades of yellow-grey, olvie-brown or yellow-brown. The surface is dry and slightly furry when young, and the cap margin curved inwards. The pale yellow flesh is 2–3 cm (0.79–1.18 in) thick under the cap and slowly turns pale blue on bruising. The pores are yellow to yellow-brown and stain dark blue quickly upon bruising. Covered in fine scales, the stipe is yellow-brown fading to pale yellow at the top, measuring 10–15 cm (3.9–5.9 in) tall by 2–4.5 cm (0.79–1.77 in) wide. It also stains pale blue on bruising. The mycelium is pale yellow.

== Distribution and habitat ==
Neoboletus venenatus has been found in southwestern China, specifically Laojun Mountain in Yulong County in Yunnan province and Kangding County in Sichuan province, and Japan, specifically Hokkaido and central Honshu. It grows in subalpine regions. associated with conifers such as Abies, Picea and Tsuga.

== Toxicity ==
Neoboletus venenatus is poisonous, causing severe gastrointestinal symptoms of nausea and recurrent vomiting, which can be severe enough to result in dehydration. Symptoms generally resolve in a few days. One toxic compound—bolevenine—was isolated and described by Matsuura and colleagues in 2007.
