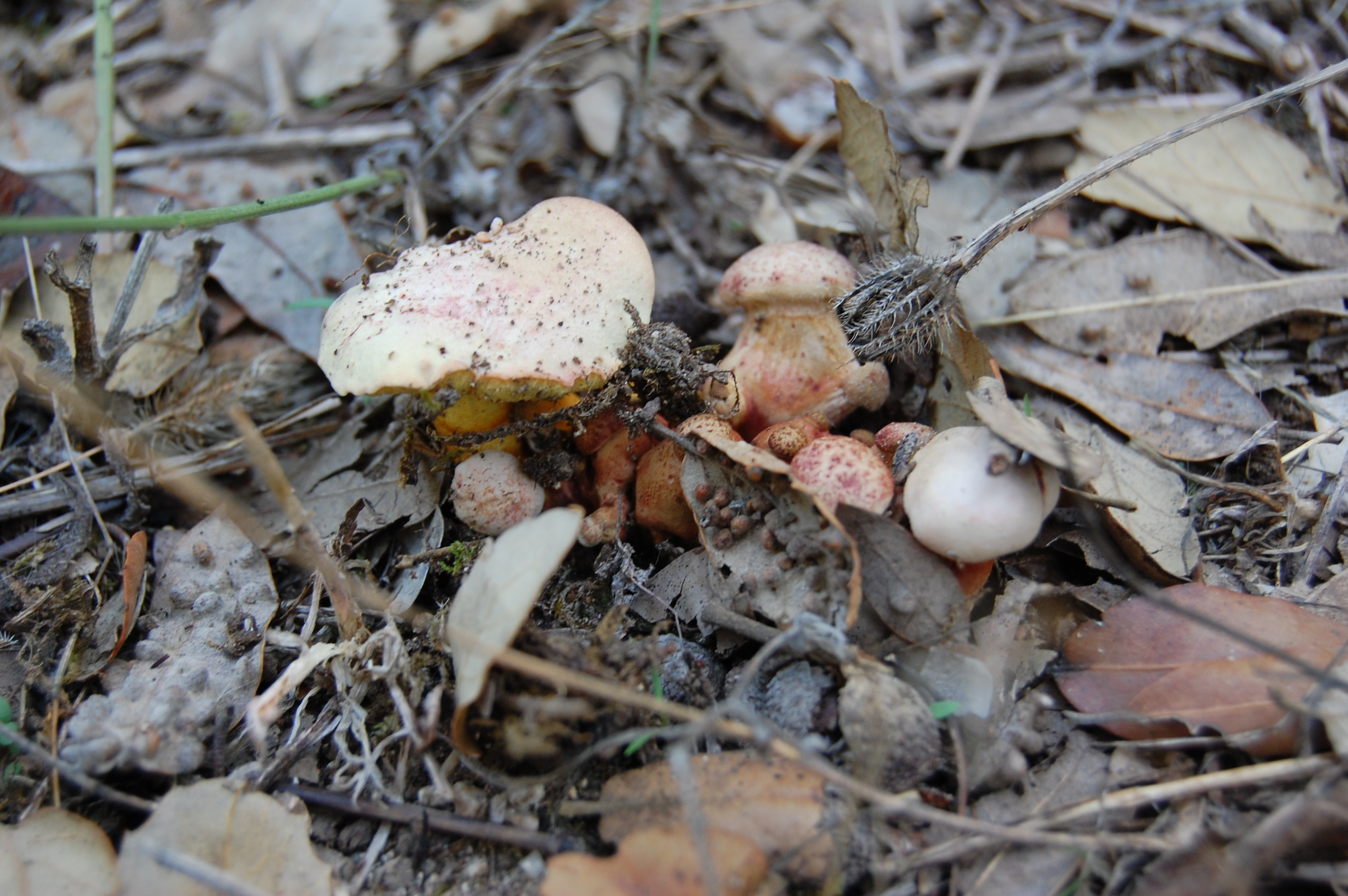

Scientific classification
- Kingdom: Fungi
- Division: Basidiomycota
- Class: Agaricomycetes
- Order: Boletales
- Family: Boletaceae
- Genus: Pulchroboletus; Gelardi, Vizzini & Simonini (2014)

Type species
- Pulchroboletus roseoalbidus (Alessio & Littini) Gelardi, Vizzini & Simonini (2014)

Synonyms
- Xerocomus roseoalbidus Alessio & Littini (1987); Boletus roseoalbidus (Alessio & Littini) G.Moreno & Heykoop (1995)

= Pulchroboletus =

Genus of fungi

Pulchroboletus is a fungal genus in the family Boletaceae. It was circumscribed in 2014 to contain the species formerly known as Xerocomus roseoalbidus, a rare bolete fungus originally described from Sardinia, Italy. Pulchroboletus roseoalbidus is found in Mediterranean Europe, where it grows in association with oak species and less often Cistus species. In 2017, the species Boletus rubricitrinus was moved to Pulchroboletus. Pulchroboletus rubricitrinus can be found under Quercus in lawns in Florida and Texas.

== Species ==
- Pulchroboletus roseoalbidus
- Pulchroboletus rubricitrinus
