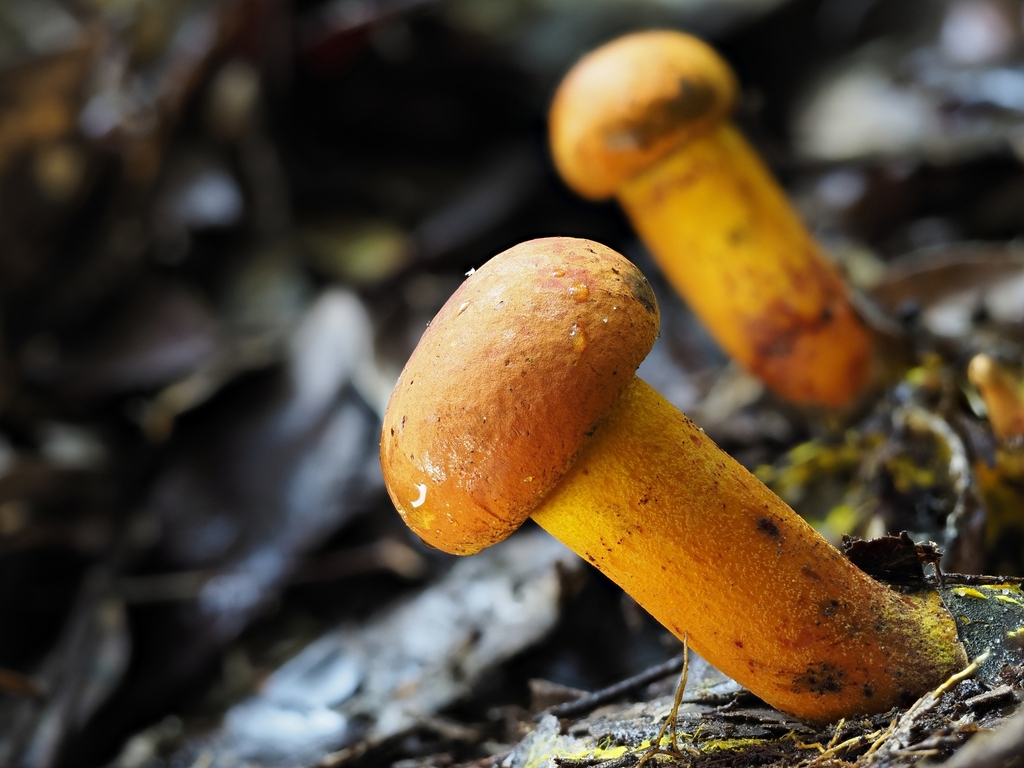
- Crocinoboletus rufoaureus

Scientific classification
- Kingdom: Fungi
- Division: Basidiomycota
- Class: Agaricomycetes
- Order: Boletales
- Family: Boletaceae
- Genus: Crocinoboletus; N.K.Zeng, Zhu L.Yang & G.Wu (2014)

Type species
- Crocinoboletus rufoaureus (Massee) N.K.Zeng, Zhu L.Yang & G.Wu (2012)

Species
- C. laetissimus C. rufoaureus

= Crocinoboletus =

Genus of fungi

Crocinoboletus is a fungal genus in the family Boletaceae. Circumscribed in 2014, it contains two species: Crocinoboletus laetissimus, and the type, C. rufoaureus. This latter bolete was originally described by George Edward Massee in 1909 from collections made in Singapore. The genus is readily characterized by bright orange fruitbodies that readily stain blue-olive when injured, and smooth spores. The cap cuticle is made of a trichoderm (a cellular arrangement wherein the outermost hyphae emerge roughly parallel, like hairs, perpendicular to the cap surface) in the middle part of the cap, and a cutis (where hyphae run parallel to the cap surface) at the cap margin. The intense orange color of the fruitbodies is caused by boletocrocin pigments.
