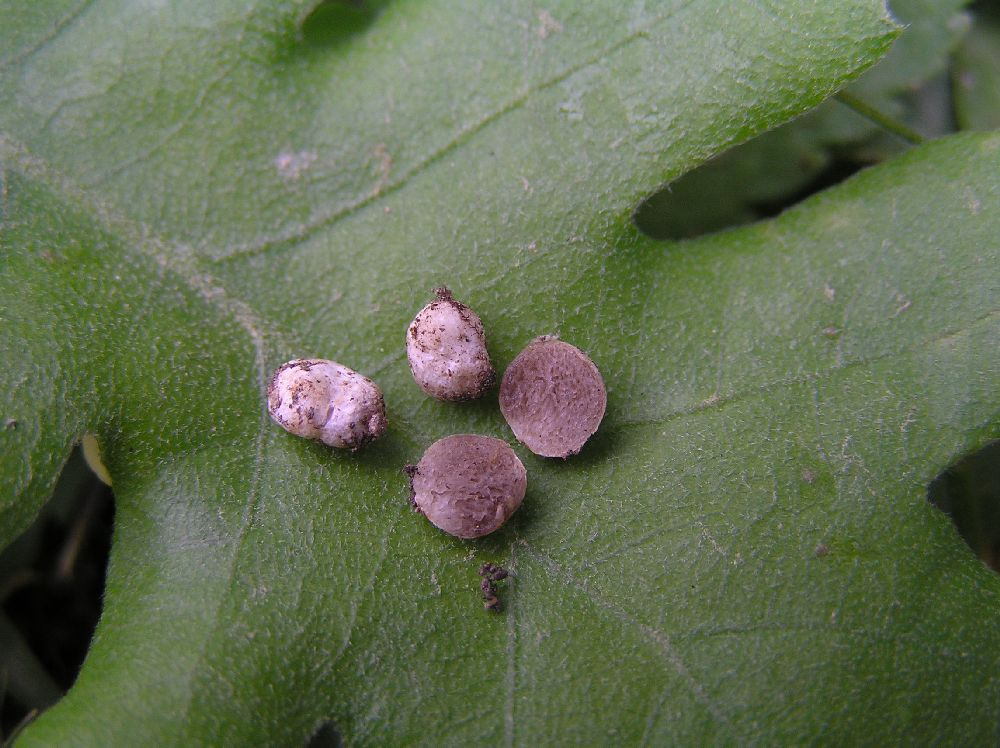
- Wakefieldia macrospora

Scientific classification
- Kingdom: Fungi
- Division: Basidiomycota
- Class: Agaricomycetes
- Order: Boletales
- Family: Boletaceae
- Genus: Wakefieldia; Corner & Hawker

Type species
- Wakefieldia striaespora Corner & Hawker

Species
- Wakefieldia macrospora Wakefieldia striaespora

= Wakefieldia =

Genus of fungi

Wakefieldia is a genus of two species of fungi, generally thought to belong in the family Boletaceae, but a recent molecular study has shown that Wakefieldia macrospora is in fact not related to Boletales and belongs to family Hymenogastraceae.
