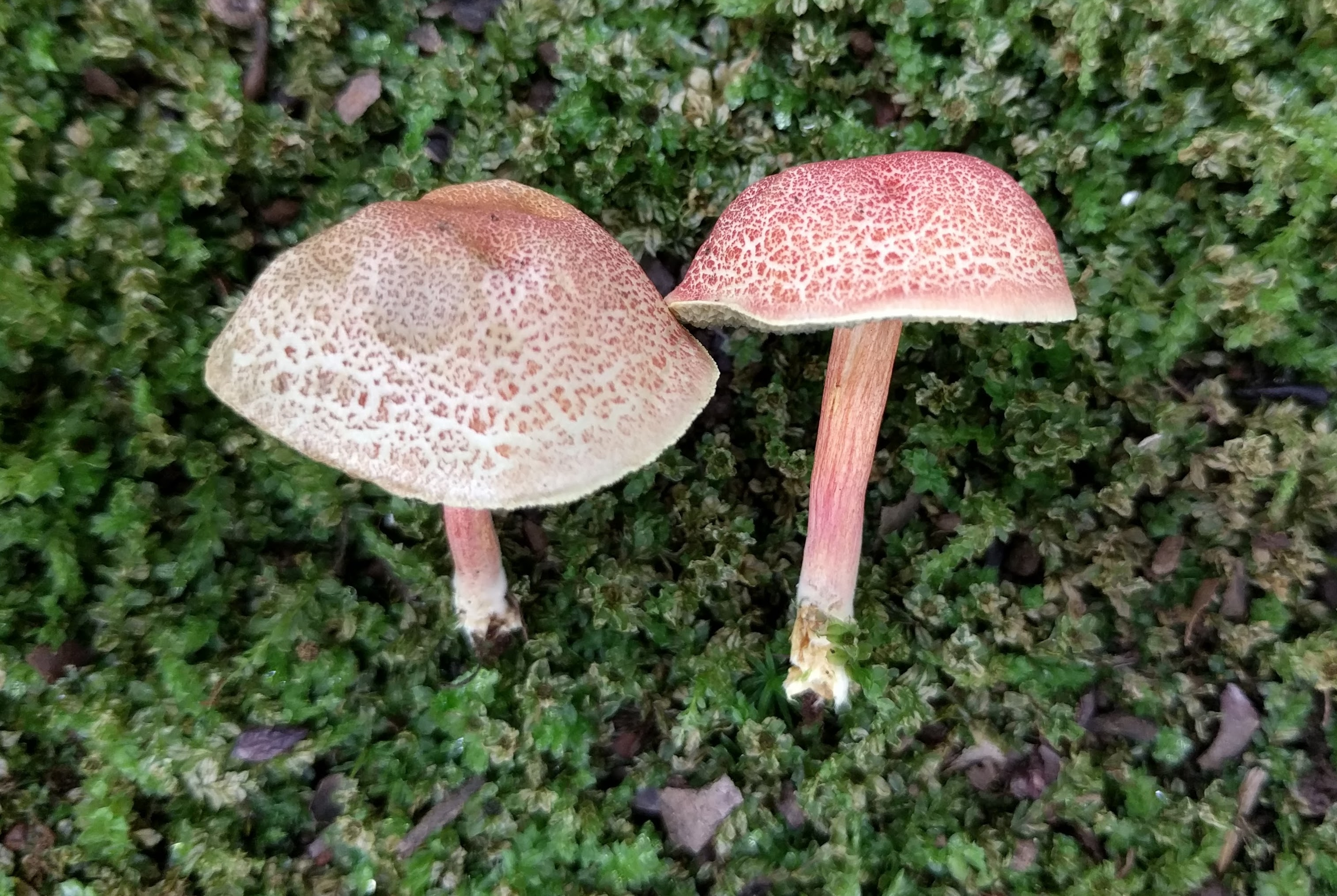
- Parvixerocomus aokii

Scientific classification
- Kingdom: Fungi
- Division: Basidiomycota
- Class: Agaricomycetes
- Order: Boletales
- Family: Boletaceae
- Genus: Parvixerocomus; G.Wu & Zhu L.Yang

Type species
- Parvixerocomus pseudoaokii G.Wu & Zhu L.Yang

Species
- Parvixerocomus aokii Parvixerocomus pseudoaokii

= Parvixerocomus =

Genus of fungi

Parvixerocomus is a fungal genus in the family Boletaceae. It was circumscribed by Chinese mycologists Gang Wu and Zhu L. Yang in 2015 with Parvixerocomus pseudoaokii from Guangdong province in southern China as the type species. Parvixerocomus aokii of southern China, including Hainan province, and Japan, was also transferred to the genus from Boletus that same year. The erection of Parvixerocomus follows recent molecular studies that outlined a new phylogenetic framework for the Boletaceae. The generic name—derived from the Latin stem parvi- ("small") and Xerocomus as the mushrooms resemble small versions of those from the genus Xerocomus.
