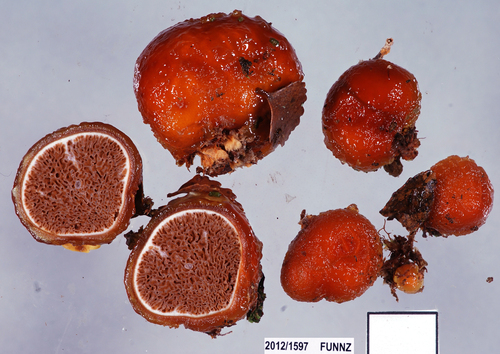
- Fruiting bodies

Scientific classification
- Kingdom: Fungi
- Division: Basidiomycota
- Class: Agaricomycetes
- Order: Agaricales
- Family: Cortinariaceae
- Genus: Cortinarius
- Species: C. beeverorum

Binomial name
- Cortinarius beeverorum Orlovich, X. Yue Wang, T. Lebel

= Cortinarius beeverorum =

Species of fungus

Cortinarius beeverorum is a species of truffle-like fungus belonging to the genus Cortinarius. It is endemic to New Zealand, where it was first described in 2014 by researchers Orlovich, X. Yue Wang, and T. Lebel.

== Etymology ==
The species is named in honor of Ross Beever, a mycologist, botanist, and plant pathologist who contributed to the research leading to the description of C. beeverorum. It also honours his wife, Jessica Eleanor Beever, a bryologist whose passion for botany has inspired generations of students to study and appreciate the natural world.

== Description ==
Cortinarius beeverorum produces fruiting bodies slightly above ground, usually found under leaf litter. They appear round-shaped to slightly flattened and have a diameter of 1 to 3 cm (0.4 to 1.2 in) across. It has a reduced and often absent stipe and columella.

The outer layer of the fungus is gelatinous and smooth, sometimes slightly bumpy, with an outer skin of the fruiting body orange-red. Underneath, there is a brown layer, which might reveal itself as the fungus ages. Inside, the fungus has small chambers (locules) that become rust-brown in mature specimens, separated by white tissue.

Under a microscope, its spores appear yellow-brown, almond- to oval-shaped, and measure on average 17×10 μm. The spores have a rough surface with bumps and ridges. Its basidia, the structures that produce spores, are 42–69 μm long and are usually club-shaped and carry four spores each.

== Distribution and habitat ==
Cortinarius beeverorum is ectomycorrhizal, typically associated with southern beech (Nothofagus). This fungus typically appears in autumn. Although it prefers southern beech forests, it has sometimes been found near tea trees (Leptospermum).

It has been recorded 26 times across eight different locations, with an estimated range of about 196,000 km^{2} (76,000 sq mi) and an occupied area of roughly 76 km^{2} (29 sq mi). Its occurrence spans both the North and South Island.

== Evolution ==
Bayesian inference and maximum parsimony analyses placed Cortinarius beeverorum in a clade closely related to an undescribed truffle-like species from Tasmania and to Cortinarius dulciolens.

Its evolution into the current truffle-like form likely occurred to facilitate spore dispersal by animals rather than wind, a shift typically considered irreversible due to specialised adaptations for animal attraction and consumption.

In context of New Zealand, with no endemic land mammals, dispersal would have primarily occurred through birds. Fossilised moa droppings containing Cortinarius spores confirm the ecological importance of bird-mediated fungal dispersal in ancient New Zealand forests.

At the same time, the fungus's bright colouration likely evolved to attract visually oriented bird species, such as the threatened kākāpō (Strigops habroptilus) and the extinct moa.
