= Paxillogaster =

Scientific classification
- Kingdom: Fungi
- Division: Basidiomycota
- Class: Agaricomycetes
- Order: Boletales
- Family: Boletaceae
- Genus: Paxillogaster; E.Horak

Type species
- Paxillogaster luteus E.Horak

Genus of fungi

Paxillogaster is a genus of fungi in the family Boletaceae. This is a monotypic genus, containing the single species Paxillogaster luteus.
