= Australopilus =

Scientific classification
- Kingdom: Fungi
- Division: Basidiomycota
- Class: Agaricomycetes
- Order: Boletales
- Family: Boletaceae
- Genus: Australopilus; Halling & Fechner (2012)

Type species
- Australopilus palumanus (Wolfe & Bougher) Halling & Fechner (2012)

Synonyms
- Tylopilus palumanus Wolfe & Bougher (1993); Tylopilus queenslandianus Wolfe & Bougher (1993); Tylopilus propriorichromapes Wolfe & Bougher (1993); Tylopilus subchromapes Wolfe & Bougher (1993); Tylopilus parachromapes T.H.Li & Watling (1999)

Genus of fungi

Australopilus is a fungal genus in the family Boletaceae. Circumscribed in 2012, it is monotypic, containing the single Australian species Australopilus palumanus.
