= Tubosaeta =

Scientific classification
- Kingdom: Fungi
- Division: Basidiomycota
- Class: Agaricomycetes
- Order: Boletales
- Family: Boletaceae
- Genus: Tubosaeta; E.Horak (1967)

Type species
- Tubosaeta brunneosetosa (Singer) E.Horak (1967)

Species
- T. alveolata T. aureocystis T. brunneosetosa T. calocystis T. goossensiae T. heterosetosa

Genus of fungi

Tubosaeta is a genus of fungi in the family Boletaceae. The genus was circumscribed by mycologist Egon Horak in 1967.
