= Sinoboletus =

Scientific classification
- Kingdom: Fungi
- Division: Basidiomycota
- Class: Agaricomycetes
- Order: Boletales
- Family: Boletaceae
- Genus: Sinoboletus; M.Zang (1992)

Type species
- Sinoboletus duplicatoporus M.Zang (1992)

Genus of fungi

Sinoboletus is a genus of fungi in the family Boletaceae.

== Taxonomy ==
Chinese mycologist Mu Zang, who circumscribed the genus in 1992 with Sinoboletus duplicatoporus as the type species, has been a coauthor on every subsequent described species. The genus name refers to the affiliation with Boletus, and its Chinese distribution. Zang considered the genus to be similar to Boletus or Xerocomus, but suggested that the unique stratified pore arrangement precluded placement in either of these genera.

== Description ==
Sinoboletus species produce caps that range in shape from hemispheric, to convex, to flattened. The cap surface is dry, with a tomentose texture. The flesh of the cap is either thin or thick. The golden yellow to yellow pore surface features crossveins that are arranged in two distinct layers. The pores, initially round, become angular or irregular in age. The club-shaped stipes have a dry surface, with striations at the top but no reticulations. Spores have an ovoid to ellipsoid shape.

== Habitat and distribution ==
Sinoboletus species are suspected to be mycorrhizal with members of the families Fagaceae and Pinaceae, particularly Castanea calathiformis, and Castanea fleuryi.

== Species ==
- Sinoboletus albidus – M.Zang & R.H.Petersen 2004
- Sinoboletus duplicatoporus – M.Zang 1992

Found in Jingdong County, China, at an altitude of 2,350 m (7,710 ft).

- Sinoboletus fuscus – M.Zang & C.M.Chen 1998
- Sinoboletus gelatinosus – M.Zang & R.H.Petersen 2004
- Sinoboletus guizhouensis – M.Zang & X.L.Wu 1995
- Sinoboletus maekawae – M.Zang & R.H.Petersen 2001

Found in Yunnan, China, at altitudes of 3,420 m (11,220 ft), growing under Abies georgei and Lithocarpus dealbatus.

- Sinoboletus magniporus – M.Zang 1992

Found in Yunnan, Luchun County, at an altitude of 1,300 m (4,300 ft).

- Sinoboletus magnisporus – M.Zang & C.M.Chen 1998
- Sinoboletus meipengianus – M.Zang & D.Z.Zhang 2004
- Sinoboletus tengii – M.Zang & Yan Liu 2002
- Sinoboletus wangii – M.Zang, Zhu L.Yang & Y.Zhang 2006

Yunnan Province, altitude 2,600 m (8,500 ft).
