= Phylloboletellus =

Scientific classification
- Kingdom: Fungi
- Division: Basidiomycota
- Class: Agaricomycetes
- Order: Boletales
- Family: Boletaceae
- Genus: Phylloboletellus; Singer
- Species: P. chloephorus

Binomial name
- Phylloboletellus chloephorus Singer

Genus of fungi

Phylloboletellus is a genus of bolete fungi in the family Boletaceae. It contains only a single species, Phylloboletellus chloephorus.
