= Mycoamaranthus =

Scientific classification
- Kingdom: Fungi
- Division: Basidiomycota
- Class: Agaricomycetes
- Order: Boletales
- Family: Boletaceae
- Genus: Mycoamaranthus; Castellano, Trappe & Malajczuk (1992)

Type species
- Mycoamaranthus auriorbis Castellano, Trappe & Malajczuk (1992)

Genus of fungi

Mycoamaranthus is a genus of fungi in the family Boletaceae. The genus contains three species, found in Australasia, Africa, and Southeast Asia.

The genus was circumscribed by Michael Angelo Castellano, James 'Jim' Martin Trappe and Nicholas Malajczuk in Austral. Syst. Bot. vol.5 (5) on page 613 1992.

The genus name of Mycoamaranthus is in honour of Michael P. Amaranthus (fl. 1996–2012), who was an American botanist (mycology) and research biologist. He worked at the Forestry Sciences Laboratory in Seattle.

== Species ==
As accepted by Species Fungorum;

- Mycoamaranthus auriorbis Castellano, Trappe & Malajczuk (1992)
- Mycoamaranthus cambodgensis (Pat.) Trappe, Lumyong, P. Lumyong, Sanmee & Zhu L. Yang (2003)
- Mycoamaranthus congolensis (Dissing & M. Lange) Castellano & Walleyn (2000)
