= Corneroboletus =

Scientific classification
- Kingdom: Fungi
- Division: Basidiomycota
- Class: Agaricomycetes
- Order: Boletales
- Family: Boletaceae
- Genus: Corneroboletus; N.K.Zeng & Zhu L.Yang (2012)

Type species
- Corneroboletus indecorus (Massee) N.K.Zeng & Zhu L.Yang (2012)

Synonyms
- Boletus indecorus Massee (1914); Boletus umbilicatus Massee (1909); Boletopsis corrugatus Pat. & C.F.Baker (1918); Pulveroboletus umbilicatus (Massee) Singer (1975); Pulveroboletus corrugatus (Pat. & C.F.Baker) Watling et al. (2006)

Genus of fungi

Corneroboletus is a fungal genus in the family Boletaceae. It was circumscribed in 2012 to contain the species formerly known as Boletus indecorus. Corneroboletus indecorus is found in southeastern Asia, where it grows on the ground in clusters in beech forests. The genus name honors botanist E.J.H. Corner.
