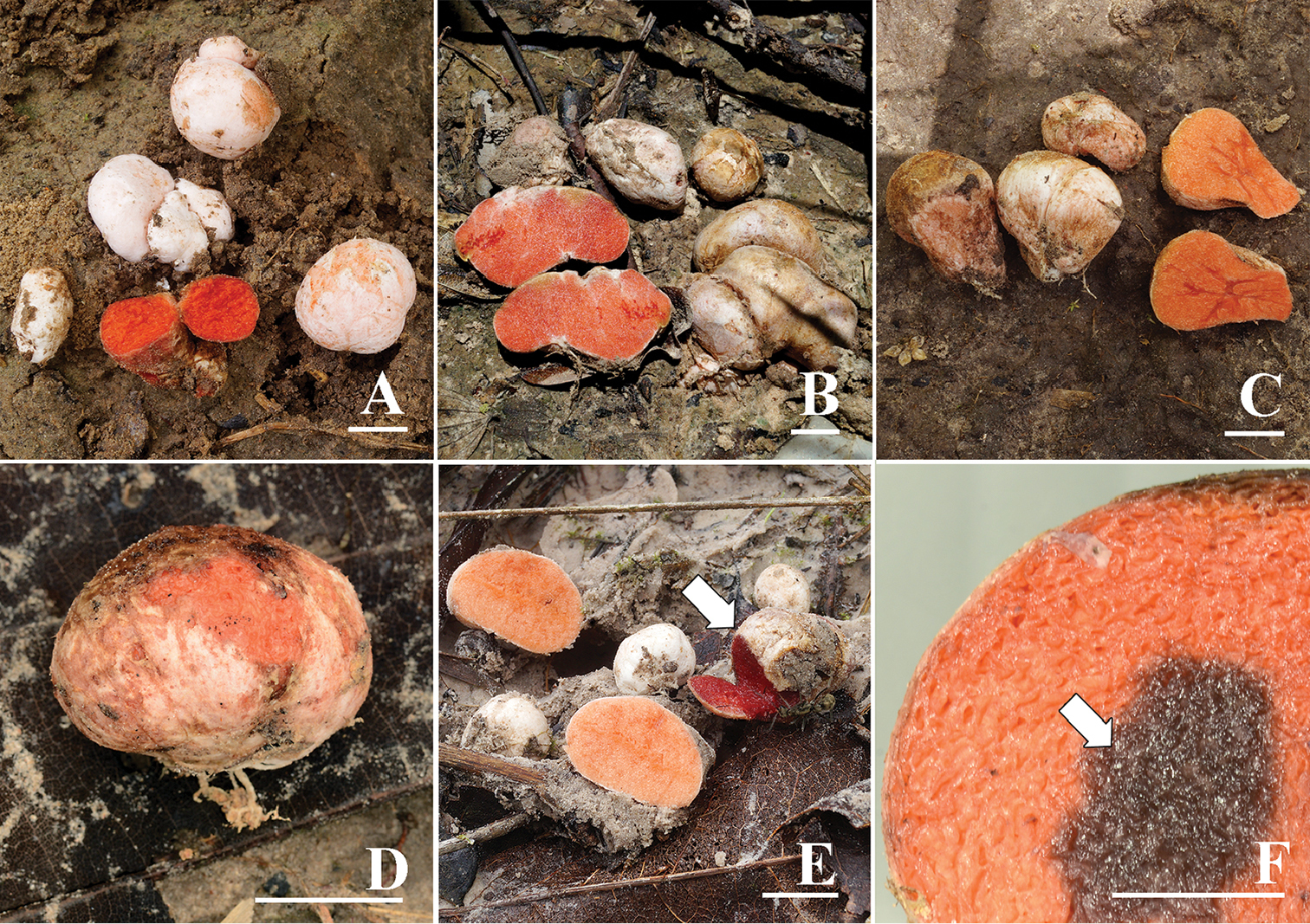
- Rhodactina rostratispora

Scientific classification
- Domain: Eukaryota
- Kingdom: Fungi
- Division: Basidiomycota
- Class: Agaricomycetes
- Order: Boletales
- Family: Boletaceae
- Genus: Rhodactina; Pegler & T.W.K.Young (1989)

Type species
- Rhodactina himalayensis Pegler & T.W.K.Young (1989)

Species
- Rhodactina himalayensis Rhodactina incarnata

= Rhodactina =

Genus of fungi

Rhodactina is a genus of secotioid fungi in the family Boletaceae. The genus was circumscribed in 1989 based on the type species Rhodactina himalayensis, found in India and northern Thailand. The genus was originally classified in the family Gauteriaceae because of similarities in spore ornamentation to the genera Gautieria and Austrogautieria. A second species, Rhodactina incarnata, was added to the genus in 2006. It is found in Dipterocarpaceae-dominated forests in Chiang Mai (northern Thailand). Molecular phylogenetics analysis shows that Rhodactina is aligned with the Boletaceae.
