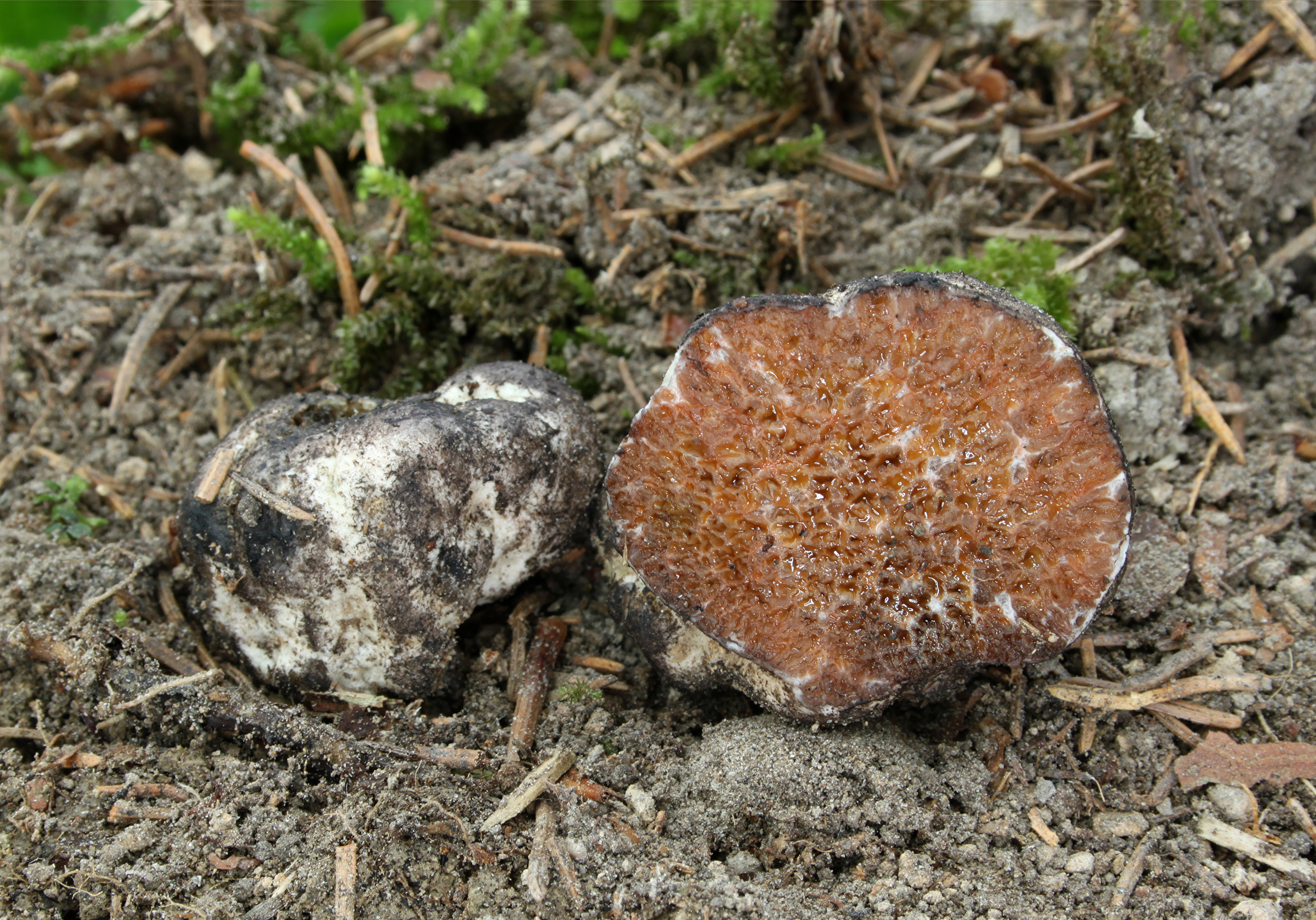
- Octaviania asterosperma

Scientific classification
- Kingdom: Fungi
- Division: Basidiomycota
- Class: Agaricomycetes
- Order: Boletales
- Family: Boletaceae
- Genus: Octaviania; Vittad. (1831)

Type species
- Octaviania asterosperma Vittad. (1831)

= Octaviania =

Genus of fungi

Octaviania is a genus of truffle-like fungi in the family Boletaceae. The widespread genus is estimated to contain 15 species.

The genus name honours of Vicenzo Ottaviani (1790–1853), an Italian doctor and mycologist and Professor of Medicine and Botany at University of Camerino.

The genus was circumscribed by Carlo Vittadini in 1831.

== Species ==
As of September 2022, Species Fungorum (via the Catalogue of Life database) accepts 48 species of Octaviana.

- Octaviania aculeatospora (Soehner) Svrček (1958)
- Octaviania arbucalensis Cabero & Faust.García (2013)
- Octaviania archeri Berk. (1859)
- Octaviania asahimontana Orihara (2011)
- Octaviania asterosperma Vittad. (1831)
- Ottaviania aurea Vittad. (1831)
- Octaviania borneensis Petri (1900)
- Octaviania brisbanensis (Berk. & Broome) G.Cunn. (1935)
- Octaviania celatifilia Orihara (2011)
- Octaviania ciqroensis Guzmán (1982)
- Octaviania cyanescens Trappe & Castellano (2000)
- Octaviania decimae Orihara (2011)
- Octaviania depauperata (Tul. & C.Tul.) J.M.Vidal, A.Paz & Lavoise (2014)
- Octaviania durianelloides Orihara (2011)
- Octaviania etchuensis Orihara (2012)
- Octaviania foetens Speg. (1917)
- Octaviania galatheia (Quél.) De Toni (1888)
- Octaviania glabra (Rodway) G.Cunn. (1935)
- Octaviania hesperi Orihara (2011)
- Octaviania hinsbyi (Rodway) G.Cunn. (1938)
- Octaviania japonimontana Orihara (2011)
- Octaviania kobayasii Orihara (2011)
- Octaviania lamingtonensis (J.W.Cribb) T.Lebel & Castellano (2002)
- Octaviania levispora Rodway (1924)
- Octaviania longiana S.Ahmad (1950)
- Octaviania macrospora Singer & A.H.Sm. (1961)
- Octaviania malaiensis(Corner & Hawker) Trappe, T.Lebel & Castellano (2002)
- Octaviania moravica Velen. (1947)
- Octaviania mortae Orihara (2011)
- Octaviania nigrescens J.W.Cribb (1958)
- Octaviania nonae Orihar (2011)
- Octaviania odoratissima Vittad. (1831)
- Octaviania olida Malençon & Astier (1993)
- Octaviania pallida (Lloyd) Lloyd (1922)
- Octaviania picea Velen. (1939)
- Octaviania plena J.W.Cribb (1958)
- Octaviania radicans Rick (1961)
- Octaviania radicata (J.W.Cribb) Pegler & T.W.K.Young (1979)
- Octaviania sarcomelas Vittad. (1931)
- Octaviania soderstromii (Lagerh.) Lloyd (1922)
- Octaviania stillingerii Lloyd (1922)
- Octaviania tasmanica (Kalchbr. ex Massee) Lloyd (1922)
- Octaviania vacekii A.Paz, J.M.Vidal, Lavoise, Læssøe, K.Killingmo, Molia & Handberg (2014)
- Octaviania yaeyamaensis Orihara (2011)
- Octaviania zelleri Orihara & M.E.Sm. (2011)
