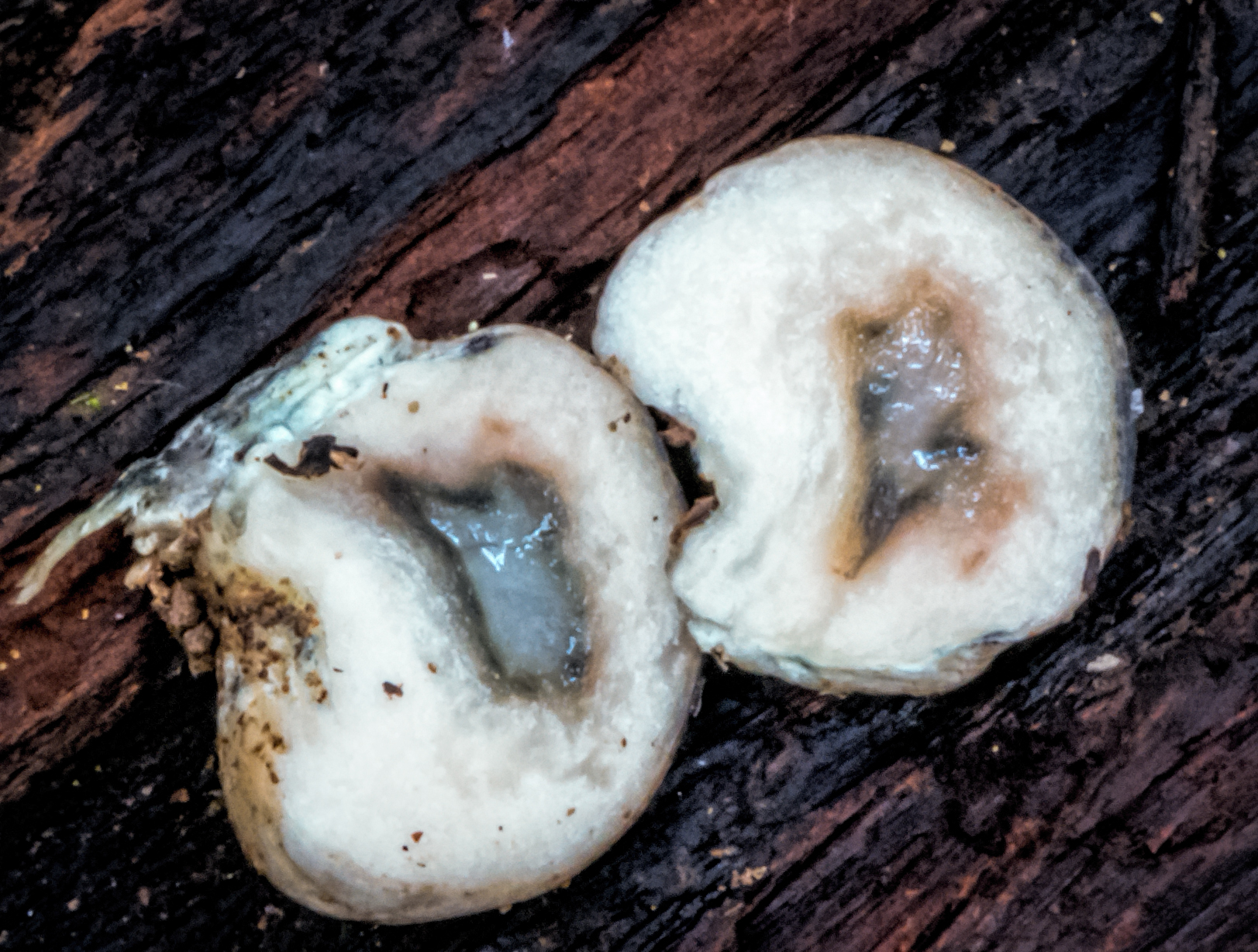
- Sectioned Rossbeevera fruit body found in New South Wales, Australia

Scientific classification
- Kingdom: Fungi
- Division: Basidiomycota
- Class: Agaricomycetes
- Order: Boletales
- Family: Boletaceae
- Genus: Rossbeevera; T.Lebel & Orihara (2012)

Type species
- Rossbeevera pachyderma (Zeller & C.W.Dodge) T.Lebel (2012)

Species
- R. bispora; R. eucyanea; R. griseobrunnea; R. griseovelutina; R. mucosa; R. vittatispora; R. westraliensis; R. yunnanensis

= Rossbeevera =

Genus of fungi

Rossbeevera is a genus of sequestrate (truffle-like) fungi in the family Boletaceae. It was first published in 2012 under the erroneous name Rosbeeva, but was corrected to Rossbeevera in the same issue. The genus was created to contain species formerly placed in Chamonixia, but characterized by having ellipsoid to spindle-shaped spores with 3–5 longitudinal ridges, bluish-green to deep blue fruit body staining reaction, and a thin whitish peridium. The Chinese species R. yunnanensis is the earliest diverging lineage within the genus, and has a close phylogenetic relationship with the bolete genera Turmalinea and Leccinellum.

The genus name Rossbeevera honours Ross Beever (1946–2010), a New Zealand botanist and mycologist.

== Species ==
As of April 2023, Index Fungorum lists the following species in Rossbeevera:

Image	Name	Taxon Author	Year
	Rossbeevera bispora	(B.C. Zhang & Y.N. Yu) T. Lebel & Orihara	2012
	Rossbeevera cryptocyanea	Orihara	2016
	Rossbeevera eucyanea	Orihara	2012
	Rossbeevera griseobrunnea	Iqbal Hosen & T.H. Li	2019
	Rossbeevera griseovelutina	Orihara	2012
	Rossbeevera mucosa	(Petri) T. Lebel, Orihara & N. Maek.	2012
	Rossbeevera paracyanea	Orihara	2015
	Rossbeevera vittatispora	(G.W. Beaton, Pegler & T.W.K. Young) T. Lebel	2012
	Rossbeevera westraliensis	T. Lebel, Orihara & N. Maek.	2012
	Rossbeevera yunnanensis	Orihara & M.E. Sm.	2012
