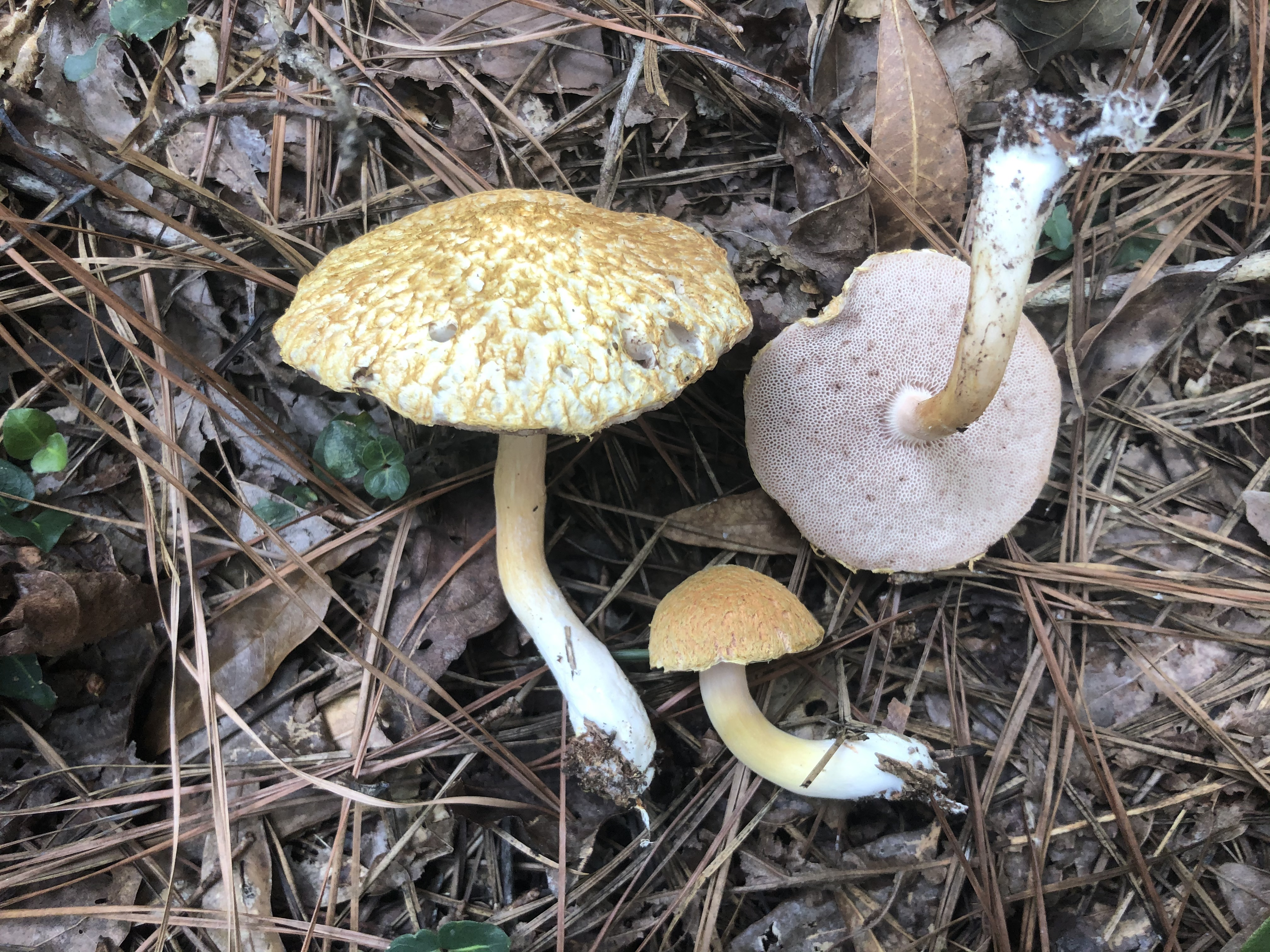

Scientific classification
- Kingdom: Fungi
- Division: Basidiomycota
- Class: Agaricomycetes
- Order: Boletales
- Family: Boletaceae
- Genus: Veloporphyrellus; L.D.Gómez & Singer

Type species
- Veloporphyrellus pantoleucus L.D.Gómez & Singer (1984)

Species
- V. africanus V. alpinus V. conicus V. gracilioides V. pantoleucus V. pseudovelatus V. velatus V. vulpinus

= Veloporphyrellus =

Genus of fungi

Veloporphyrellus is a genus of fungi in the family Boletaceae. Species are characterized by having a pinkish to pinkish-gray hymenophore, a membrane-like partial veil that hangs from the cap margin, smooth spores, and a trichoderm-like cap cuticle.

== Species ==
The genus, circumscribed in 1984, contains eight species.

| Scientific name | Taxon author | Year |
|---|---|---|
| Veloporphyrellus africanus | Watling | 1993 |
| Veloporphyrellus alpinus | Y.C. Li & Zhu L. Yang | 2014 |
| Veloporphyrellus conicus | (Ravenel) B. Ortiz, Y.C. Li & Zhu L. Yang | 2014 |
| Veloporphyrellus gracilioides | Y.C. Li & Zhu L. Yang | 2016 |
| Veloporphyrellus latisporus | J. Khan & S. Ullah | 2021 |
| Veloporphyrellus pantoleucus | L.D. Gómez & Singer | 1984 |
| Veloporphyrellus pseudovelatus | Y.C. Li & Zhu L. Yang | 2014 |
| Veloporphyrellus velatus | (Rostr.) Y.C. Li & Zhu L. Yang | 2014 |
| Veloporphyrellus vulpinus | T.H.G. Pham, O.V. Morozova, A.V. Alexandrova & E.S. Popov | 2019 |
