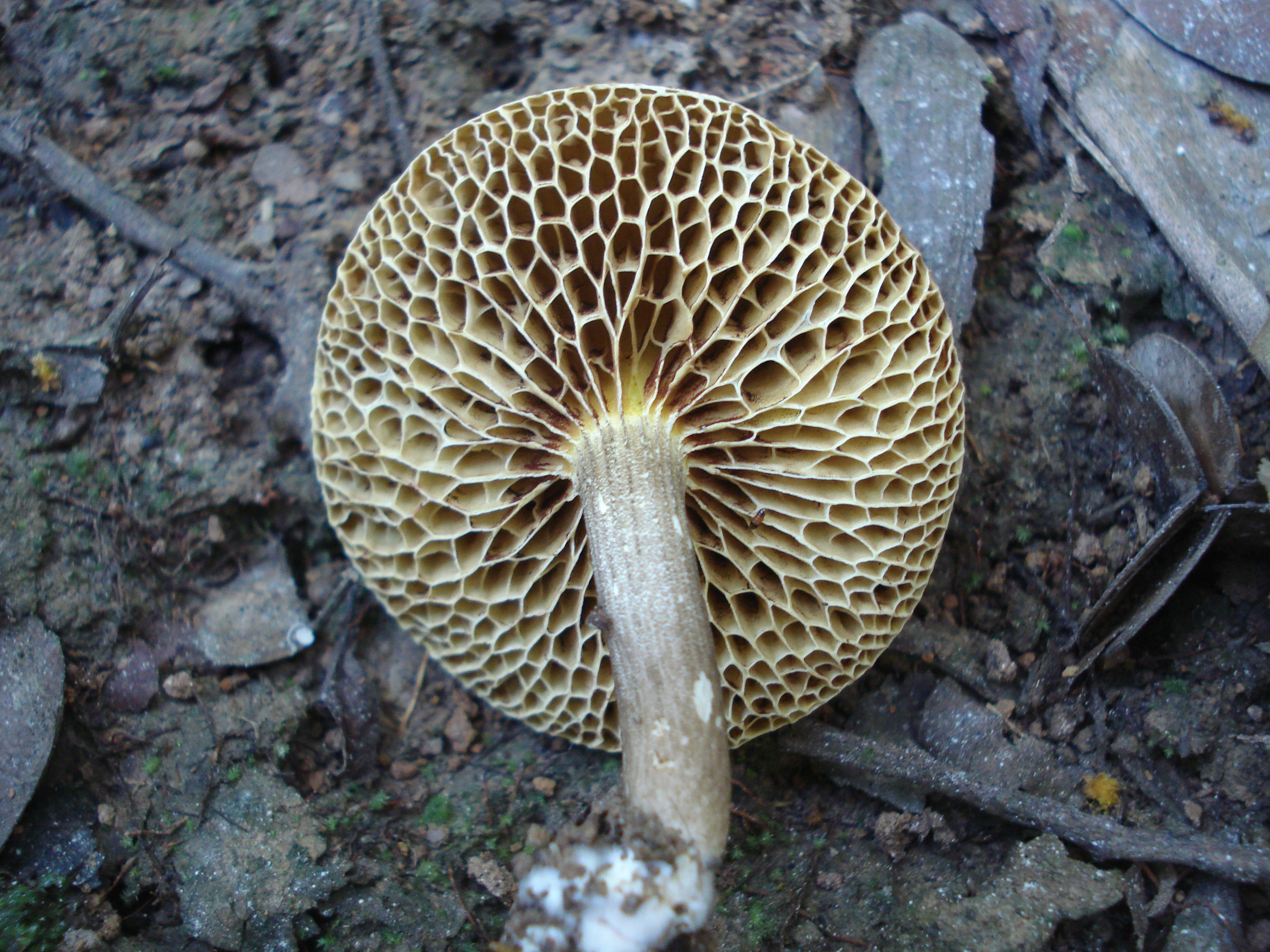

Scientific classification
- Kingdom: Fungi
- Division: Basidiomycota
- Class: Agaricomycetes
- Order: Boletales
- Family: Boletaceae
- Genus: Borofutus; Hosen & Zhu L.Yang (2012)

Type species
- Borofutus dhakanus Hosen & Zhu L.Yang (2012)

= Borofutus =

Genus of fungi

Borofutus is a fungal genus in the family Boletaceae. Newly described in 2012, it is monotypic, containing the single species Borofutus dhakanus, found in tropical Asia. The generic name Borofutus derives from the Bengali language, and means "large pore", while dhakanus refers to the type locality in Gazipur, Dhaka Division, Bhawal National Park, in Bangladesh. Molecular analysis shows Borofutus to be closely related to Spongiforma.

== Generic concept of Borofutus ==
Borofutus is a monotypic genus in the family Boletaceae and first described from the tropical region of Bangladesh. Basidiomata epigeous, stipitate-pileate with tubular hymenophore. Pileus covered with squamules. Hymenophore subdecurrent, broadly tubular; pores up to 2–6 mm wide, pallid to cream when young, becoming yellowish to golden brown at maturity. Stipe central, covered with squamules but apical part glabrous, upper half ribbed by the subdecurrent lines of the hymenophore or confined to apex; basal mycelium whitish. Context pallid to light yellowish, usually unchanging in color when cut but turning pale reddish to pale reddish purple in some areas over the course of 1–2 h. Basidiospores purple to purplish red in H_{2}O, purplish violet in 5% KOH, boletoid to somewhat amygdaliform, slightly thick-walled; minutely verrucose under light microscope but with regular to irregular shallow pits under SEM. Cheilocystidia and pleurocystidia lageniform, thick-walled. Pileipellis a trichoderm, becoming a subcutis when mature. Clamp connections absent in all tissues. Mycorrhizal association with the monodominant stands of Shorea robusta in Bangladesh.
