= Solioccasus =

Scientific classification
- Kingdom: Fungi
- Division: Basidiomycota
- Class: Agaricomycetes
- Order: Boletales
- Family: Boletaceae
- Genus: Solioccasus; Trappe, Osmundson, Manfr. Binder, Castellano & Halling (2013)

Type species
- Solioccasus polychromus Trappe, Osmundson, Manfr.Binder, Castellano & Halling (2013)

Genus of fungi

Solioccasus is a fungal genus in the family Boletaceae. It is a monotypic genus, containing the single Australasian species Solioccasus polychromus. This is a truffle-like species with a roughly spherical to lobed fruitbody, which measures up to 4.5 cm (1.8 in) in diameter. It is initially dull white, but becomes yellow to pink to orange to red in maturity, making it one of the most brightly colored hypogeous species known.

Solioccasus polychromus is found in northern Australia, including Queensland and the Northern Territory, and Papua New Guinea. The fruitbodies grow in the ground or partially emergent in lowland tropical and subtropical forests, often in sandy soil. Plant associates include Allocasuarina littoralis, Corymbia dichromophloia, C. erythrophloia, C. polycarpa, Eucalyptus pellita, E. pilularis, E. racemosa, E. tetrodonta, and species from the genera Leptospermum, Lophostemon, and Melaleuca.
