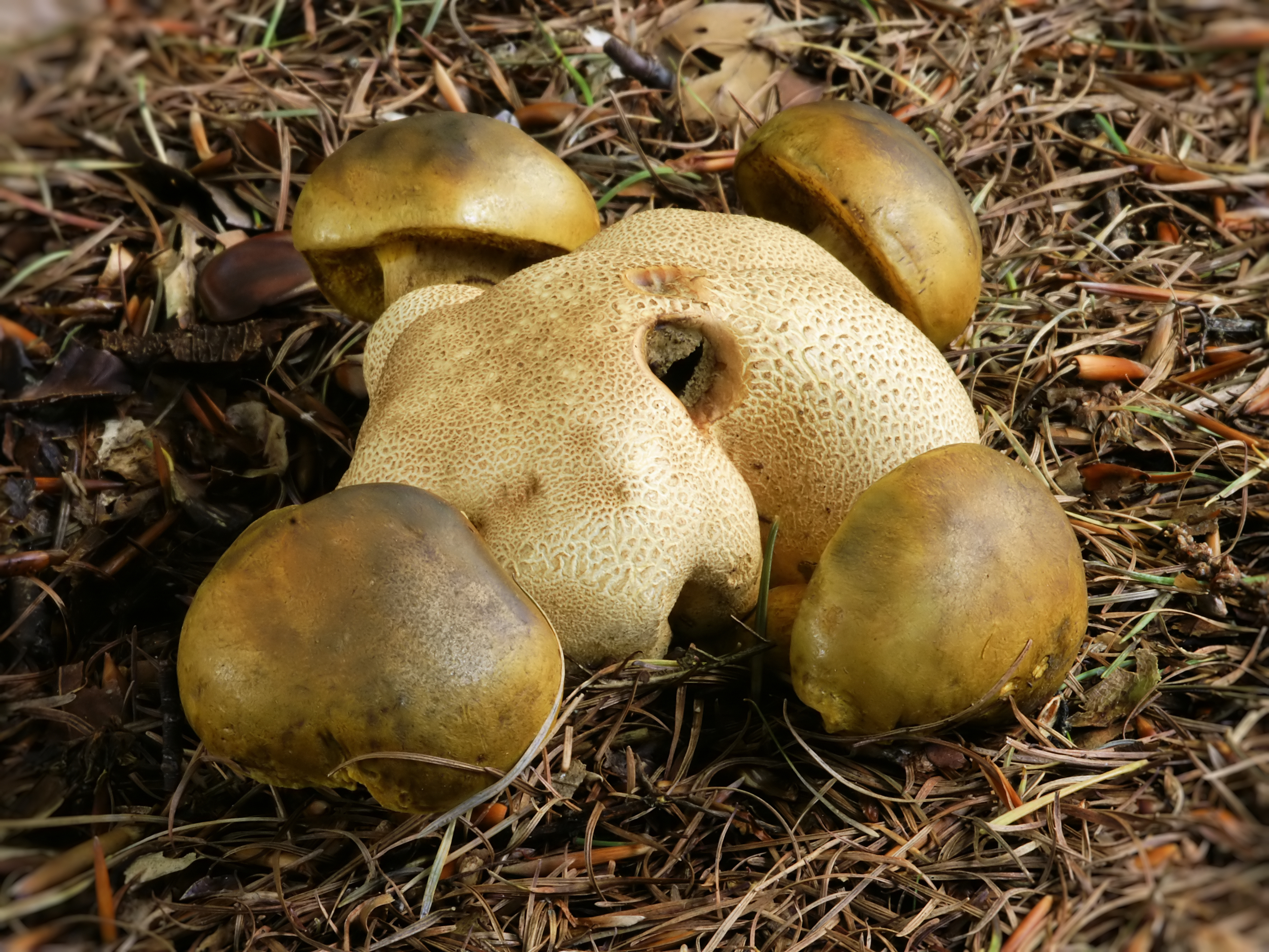
- Pseudoboletus parasiticus

Scientific classification
- Kingdom: Fungi
- Division: Basidiomycota
- Class: Agaricomycetes
- Order: Boletales
- Family: Boletaceae
- Genus: Pseudoboletus; Šutara (1991)

Type species
- Pseudoboletus parasiticus Šutara (1991)

Species
- Pseudoboletus astraeicola Pseudoboletus parasiticus

= Pseudoboletus =

Genus of fungus

Pseudoboletus is a genus of fungus in the family Boletaceae. The genus contains two species found in north temperate areas that grow in a parasitic association with species of Scleroderma and Pisolithus, or Astraeus.

== Species ==
As of August 2023, Index Fungorum lists the following species in Pseudoboletus:

Image	Name	Taxon author	Year
	Pseudoboletus astraeicola	(Imazeki) Šutara	2005
	Pseudoboletus parasiticus	(Bull.) Šutara	1991
