= Boletochaete =

Scientific classification
- Kingdom: Fungi
- Division: Basidiomycota
- Class: Agaricomycetes
- Order: Boletales
- Family: Boletaceae
- Genus: Boletochaete; Singer (1944)

Type species
- Boletochaete spinifera (Pat. & C.F.Baker) Singer (1944)

Species
- B. bicolor B. setulosa B. spinifera

Genus of fungi

Boletochaete is a genus of fungi in the family Boletaceae. The genus contains three species found in Africa and southeast Asia. American mycologist Rolf Singer circumscribed the genus in 1944.

== Species ==
Image	Scientific name	Taxon author	Year	Distribution
	Boletochaete bicolor	Singer	1986	
	Boletochaete hastulifera	(Corner) E. Horak	2011	Malaysia
	Boletochaete mirans	(Corner) E. Horak	2011	Malaysia
	Boletochaete setulosa	M. Zang	1986	
	Boletochaete spinifera	(Pat. & C.F. Baker) Singer	1944	Malaysia
