= Heliogaster =

Scientific classification
- Kingdom: Fungi
- Division: Basidiomycota
- Class: Agaricomycetes
- Order: Boletales
- Family: Boletaceae
- Genus: Heliogaster; Orihara & Iwase

Type species
- Heliogaster columellifer (Kobayasi) Orihara & Iwase

Genus of fungi

Heliogaster is a sequestrate genus of fungi in the family Boletaceae. This is a monotypic genus, containing the single species Heliogaster columellifer, found in Japan. The genus was first described in 2010, to accommodate the species formerly named Octaviania columellifera by Kobayasi in 1937.
