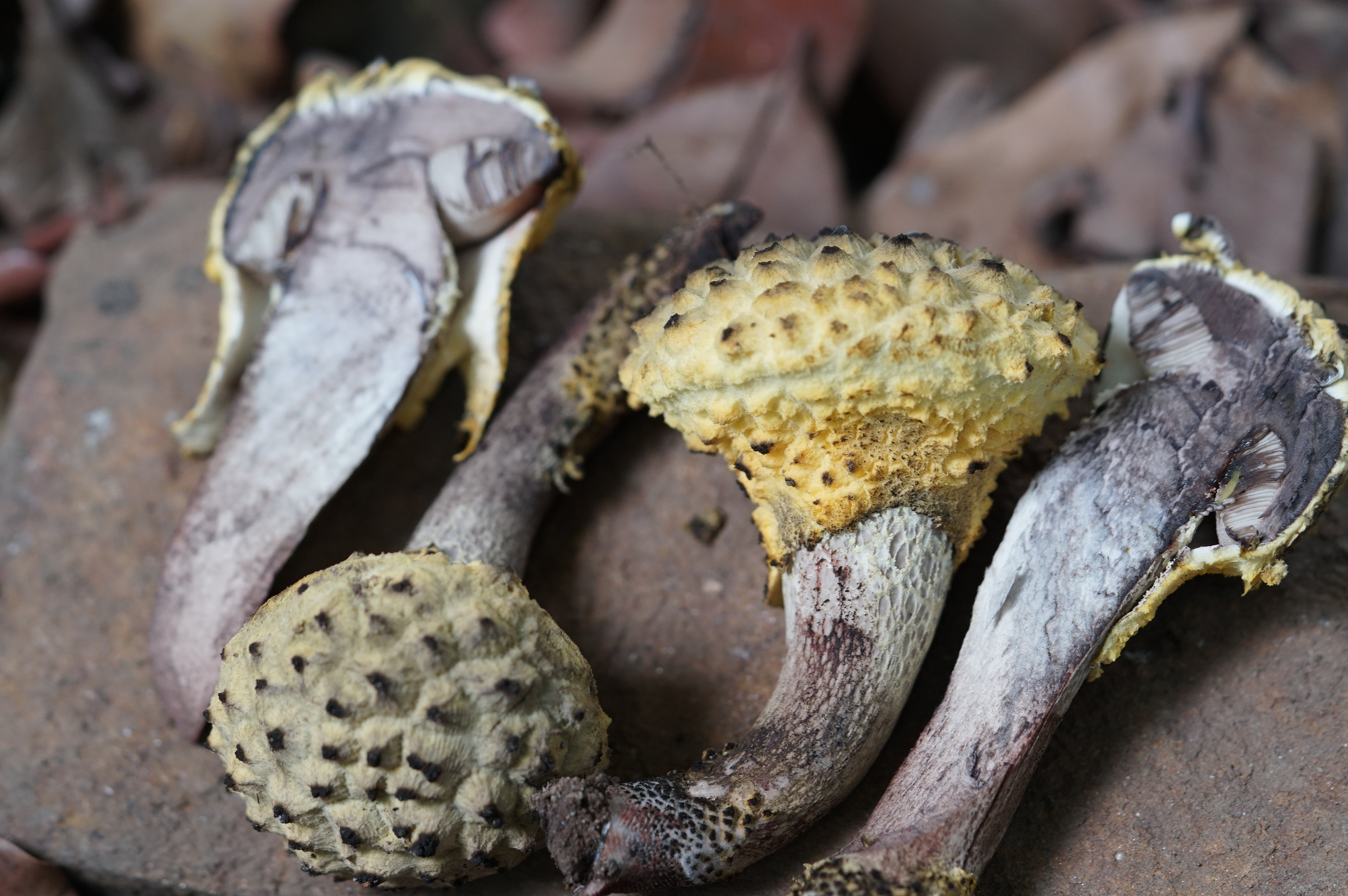

Scientific classification
- Kingdom: Fungi
- Division: Basidiomycota
- Class: Agaricomycetes
- Order: Boletales
- Family: Boletaceae
- Genus: Afroboletus; Pegler & T.W.K.Young (1981)

Type species
- Afroboletus pterosporus (Singer) Pegler & T.W.K.Young (1981)

Species
- A. azureotinctus; A. costatisporus; A. elegans; A. lepidellus; A. luteolus; A. multijugus; A. pterosporus

= Afroboletus =

Genus of fungi

Afroboletus is a genus of fungi in the family Boletaceae. The genus, circumscribed in 1981, contains seven species found in tropical Africa.

== Taxonomy ==
When defining the genus, Pegler and Young placed it in the family Strobilomycetaceae, and considered Afroboletus to be a "primitive" and possibly ancestral member of the group because of the form of its basidia and spores, the reticulation of the stem, tropical distribution, and non-mycorrhizal requirements of its species.

== Description ==
Fruit bodies of Afroboletus species have fleshy caps that are hemispherical or convex to applanate (horizontally flattened). As it ages, the cap surface becomes fuliginous (sooty) and black, developing pustules or scales. The cap margin is appendiculate, meaning that partial veil remnants hang along the cap margin. On the cap underside, the pore surface comprises tubes that are adnately attached to the stipe. The pore surface appears swollen, and is initially white before turning greyish or pale pinkish. The tubes are relatively long, measuring 1.5–2.5 cm (0.6–1.0 in), and there are typically 1–2 pores per millimeter. Stipes are slender, cylindrical, firm, and solid (i.e., not hollow). The colour of the stipe surface is similar to that of the cap, and also eventually turns blackish. The veil is persistent, fluffy, and sometimes leaves a ring on the stipe. The flesh is whitish, discoloring black on exposure.

Spore prints are dark fuscous brown. Spores are short-ellipsoid with a deep yellowish-brown colour. Their surface features an intricate ornamentation of 8–12 large, winged, longitudinal costae interspersed with ridges, and a thickened rim at the base. Basidia (spore-bearing cells) are pear-shaped and bear four sterigmata. Cystidia are club-shaped to lance-shaped, thin-walled, and have a brown pigment contained within vacuoles. The hymenophoral tissue is bilaterally divergent, and contains gelatinized layers. The cap cuticle is arranged in a trichodermial palisade (erect, roughly parallel chains of closely packed cells) consisting of short cylindrical or sac-like, thick-walled cells with brown contents. The hyphae lack clamp connections.

== Species ==
There are seven species recognized in Afroboletus, all from tropical Africa:

Image	Name	Authority	Year	Distribution
	Afroboletus azureotinctus	Watling	1993	Zambia
	Afroboletus costatisporus	(Beeli) Watling	1993	Congo
	Afroboletus elegans	Heinem. & Rammeloo	1995	Burundi
	Afroboletus lepidellus	(E.-J. Gilbert ex Heinem.) Watling	1993	Cameroon
	Afroboletus luteolus	(Heinem.) Pegler & T.W.K.Young	1981	Malawi; Burundi; Zambia
	Afroboletus multijugus	Heinem. & Rammeloo	1995	Burundi
	Afroboletus pterosporus	(Singer) Pegler & T.W.K.Young	1981	Liberia

== Uses ==
Both Afroboletus costatisporus and A. luteolus are used as food.
