= Royoungia =

Scientific classification
- Kingdom: Fungi
- Division: Basidiomycota
- Class: Agaricomycetes
- Order: Boletales
- Family: Boletaceae
- Genus: Royoungia; Castellano, Trappe & Malajczuk (1992)

Type species
- Royoungia boletoides Castellano, Trappe & Malajczuk (1992)

Genus of fungi

Royoungia is a fungal genus in the family Boletaceae. This genus is represented by the type species Royoungia boletoides, which was found in Australia. In 2016, 5 more species were found in China.

The genus was circumscribed by Michael Angelo Castellano, James Martin 'Jim' Trappe and Nicholas Malajczuk in Austral. Syst. Bot. vol.5 (5) on page 614 in 1992.

The genus name of Royoungia is in honour of Roy Young, who was a plant collector of subterranean growing fungi. In 1988 he joined an Expedition in Queensland, Australia.

This genus is characterized by the boletoid or gasteroid basidiomata.

== Species ==
As accepted by Species Fungorum;

- Royoungia boletoides Castellano, Trappe & Malajczuk (1992)
- Royoungia coccineinana (Corner) Yan C. Li & Zhu L. Yang (2016)
- Royoungia grisea Yan C. Li & Zhu L. Yang (2016)
- Royoungia palumana (Wolfe & Bougher) Yan C. Li & Zhu L. Yang (2016)
- Royoungia reticulata Yan C. Li & Zhu L. Yang (2016)
- Royoungia rubina Yan C. Li & Zhu L. Yang (2016)
