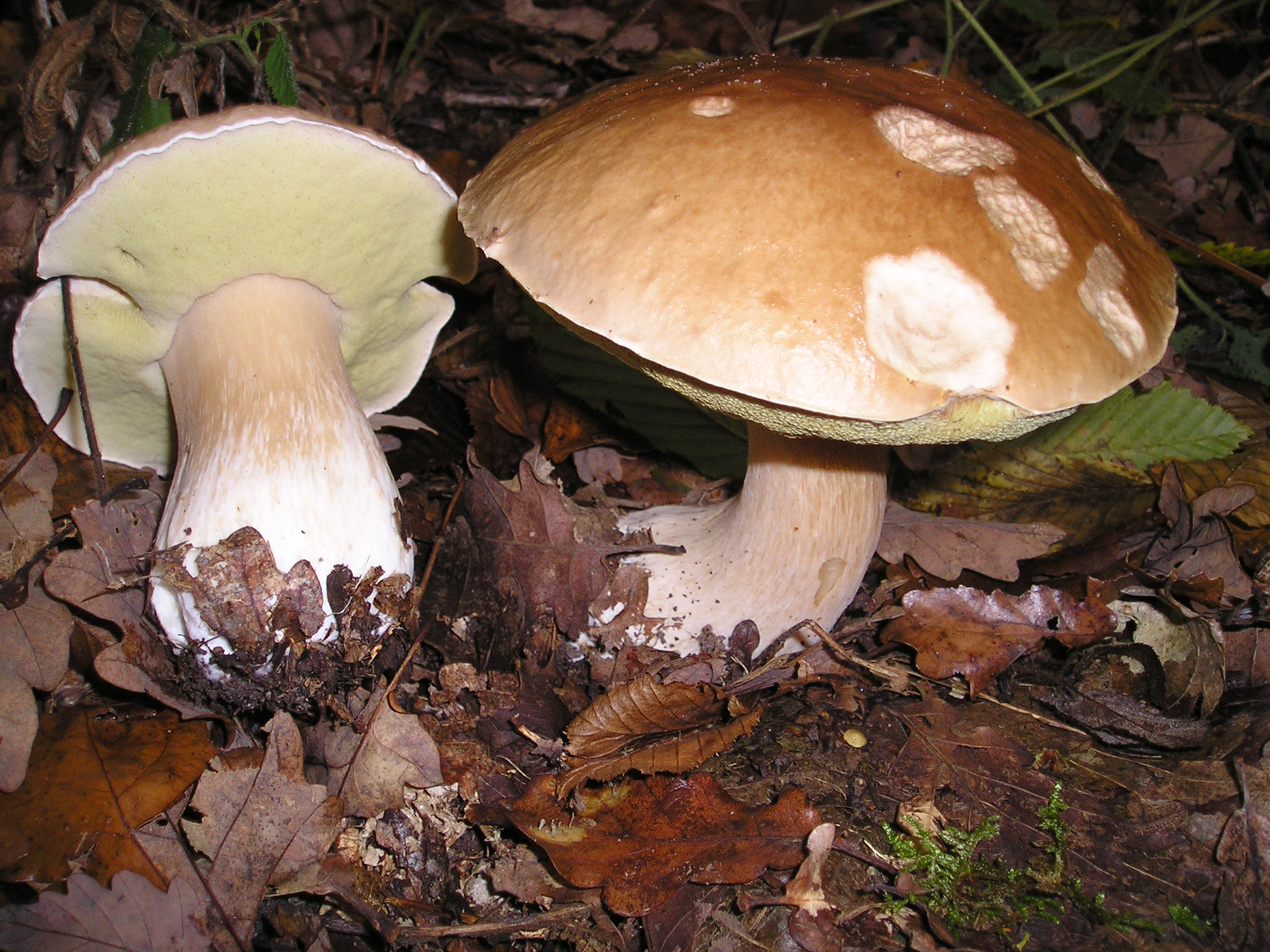
- Cep, Boletus edulis

Scientific classification
- Kingdom: Fungi
- Division: Basidiomycota
- Class: Agaricomycetes
- Order: Boletales
- Family: Boletaceae; Chevall. (1826)

Type genus
- Boletus Fr. (1821)

Subfamilies
- Austroboletoideae; Boletoideae; Chalciporoideae; Leccinoideae; Xerocomoideae; Zangioideae; Pulveroboletus Group

Synonyms
- Strobilomycetaceae E.-J.Gilbert (1931); Octavianiaceae Locq. ex Pegler & T.W.K.Young (1979); Boletellaceae Jülich (1981); Chamonixiaceae Jülich (1981); Xerocomaceae Pegler & T.W.K.Young (1981); Hapalopilaceae Jülich (1982)

= Boletaceae =

Family of fungi

The Boletaceae are a family of mushroom-forming fungi, primarily characterised by small pores on the spore-bearing hymenial surface (at the underside of the mushroom), instead of gills as are found in most agarics. Nearly as widely distributed as the agarics, the family is renowned for hosting some prime edible species highly sought after by mushroom hunters worldwide, such as the cep or king bolete (Boletus edulis). A number of rare or threatened species are also present in the family, that have become the focus of increasing conservation concerns. As a whole, the typical members of the family are commonly known as boletes.

Boletes are a group of mushrooms reasonably safe for human consumption, as none of them are known to be deadly to adults. Edible bolete species are especially suitable for novice collectors, since they pose little danger of being confused with deadly poisonous mushrooms, such as deadly Amanita species which bear gills instead of pores in their hymenial surface. Some boletes are toxic and may cause gastrointestinal poisoning if consumed, but these are unlikely to be confused with popular edible species in the family.

The family has been the subject of extensive systematic revisions in recent years, as some of the early established genera (particularly Boletus, Leccinum and Xerocomus), have revealed to be highly polyphyletic, and the original number of genera within the family had been underestimated. As a result, several new species and genera have been described from Asia, Europe and North America, while many existing species have been transferred to different genera, in concordance with phylogenetic results.

== Description ==
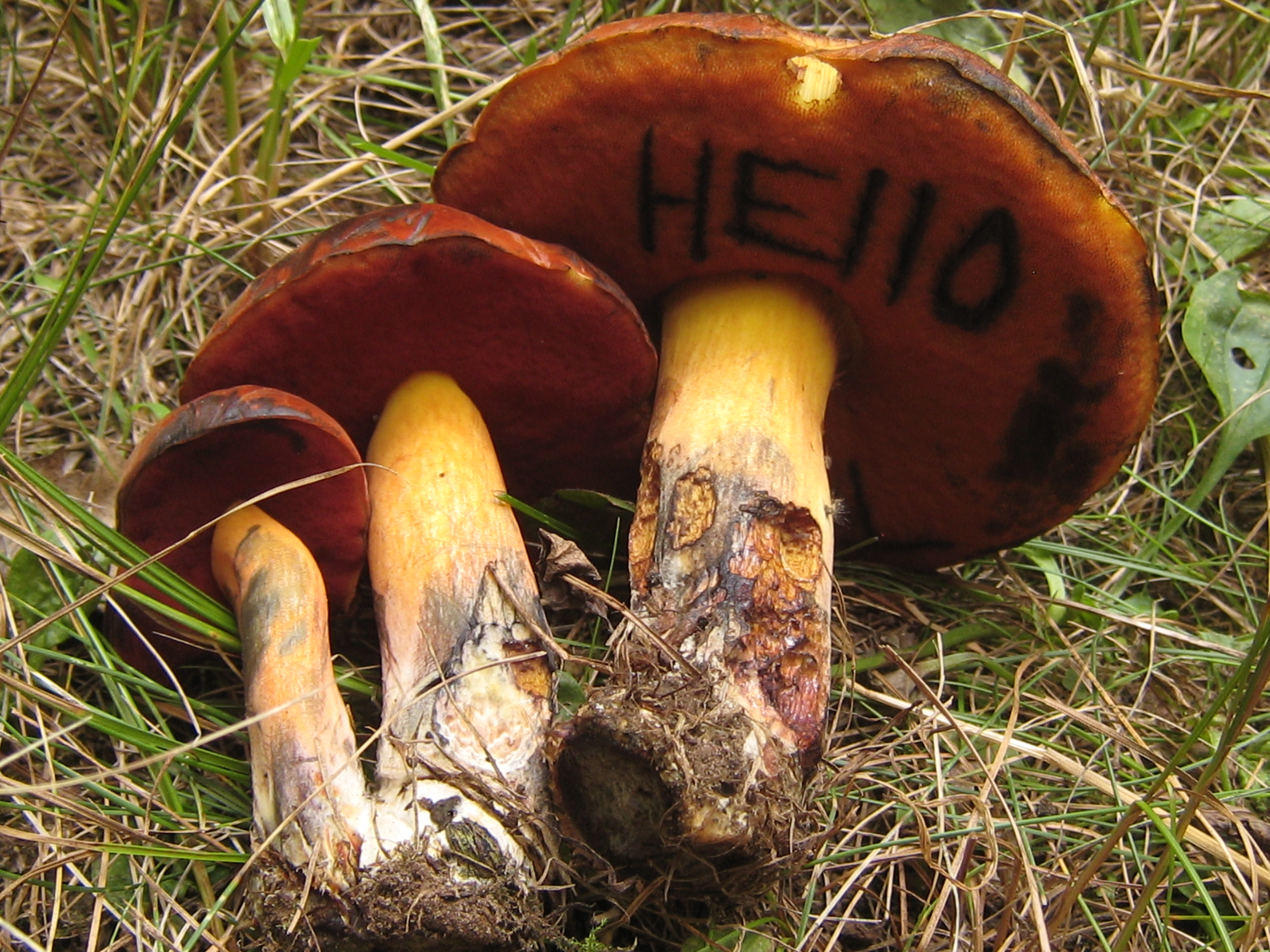
Boletus tube surface staining.

Most species of Boletaceae produce large, fleshy mushrooms, with a more or less central stipe. The fruit bodies typically have tubular hymenophores, although a small number of species (e.g. Phylloporus) are lamellate. The spore deposit colours are commonly olivaceous (yellowish-green), yellowish, brownish, or vinaceous (red-wine coloured), and when viewed under the microscope spores are usually fusiform or subfusiform. In many species, parts of the fruit body will turn blue, red, or black when bruised or exposed to the air, as a result of the oxidation of pulvinic acid derivatives, like variegatic, xerocomic, and atrotomentinic acids.

== Taxonomy ==
Boletaceae were first described by the French botanist François Fulgis Chevallier in 1826, as a family distinct from Agaricaceae. Five genera were initially included in Chevallier's circumscription: Boletus (which is the type genus of the family), Cladoporus (now synonymous with Laetiporus), Physisporus (now Perenniporia), Polyporus, and Fistulina. However, all of the original genera except Boletus have since been transferred to different families, and several new Boletaceae genera have been described.

=== Genera ===
Rolf Singer, in the 4th edition (1986) of his Agaricales in Modern Taxonomy, included 26 genera and 415 species in Boletaceae. In the Dictionary of the Fungi (10th edition, 2008), 35 Boletaceae genera were recognised, which collectively contained 787 species. Molecular phylogenetic studies in the 2000s have revised the concept of the family; in a highly cited 2006 publication, Manfred Binder and David Hibbett recognised 38 genera within the family, many of which had remained at the time undescribed. The number of Boletaceae genera increased significantly in the following years, as some of the early-established genera (Boletus, Leccinum, Xerocomus), further revealed to be highly polyphyletic. In the comprehensive work of Wu and colleagues (2014), seven major clades at subfamily level and 59 generic lineages were uncovered, including four new subfamilies (Austroboletoideae, Chalciporoideae, Leccinoideae, and Zangioideae) and 22 potential new genera. To formally name the generic lineages unravelled by molecular phylogenies, several new genera have since been described from Asia, Europe and North America including, among others, Baorangia, Butyriboletus, Cacaoporus, Caloboletus, Exsudoporus, Imperator and Rubroboletus.

Some characters traditionally emphasised in morphology-based taxonomy, such as basidiospore ornamentation and "stuffed" pore morphology, revealed to be incongruent with molecular taxonomy, suggesting that certain traits evolved more than once within the family.

Genus	Authority	Year	No. of species	Distribution
Afroboletus	Pegler & T.W.K.Young	1981	7	tropical Africa
Alessioporus	Gelardi, Vizzini & Simonini	2014	1	southern Europe
Aureoboletus	Pouzar	1957	17	widespread
Australopilus	Halling & Fechner	2012	1	Australia
Austroboletus	Wolfe	1980	~30	America, Australasia
Baorangia	G. Wu & Zhu L. Yang	2015	>2	East Asia, North America
Boletellus	Murrill	1909	~50	widespread
Boletochaete	Singer	1944	3	Africa, Southeast Asia
Boletus	Fr.	1821	~300*	widespread
Borofutus	Hosen & Zhu L.Yang	2012	1	Bangladesh
Bothia	Halling, T.J.Baroni, & Binder	2007	1	North America
Buchwaldoboletus	Pilát	1962	3	Europe, Australia
Butyriboletus	D.Arora & J.L.Frank	2014	18	widespread
Cacaoporus	Raspé & Vadthanarat	2019	2	Thailand
Caloboletus	Vizzini	2014	13	widespread
Chalciporus	Bataille	1908	25	widespread
Chamonixia	Rolland	1899	8	widespread
Corneroboletus	N.K.Zeng & Zhu L.Yang	2012	1	Singapore, Malaysia, tropical China
Crocinoboletus	N.K. Zeng, Zhu L. Yang & G. Wu	2015	2	East Asia, South Asia
Cyanoboletus	Gelardi, Vizzini & Simonini	2014	3	widespread
Durianella	A.W.Wilson & Manfr.Binder	2008	1	Malaysia, Borneo
Erythrophylloporus	Raspé, Vadthanarat & Lumyong	2019	3	China, Thailand
Exsudoporus	Vizzini, Simonini & Gelardi	2014	3	North America, Europe
Fistulinella	Henn.	1901	15	pantropical
Gastroboletus	Lohwag	1962	13	widespread
Gastroleccinum	Thiers	1989	1	North America
Harrya	Halling, Nuhn & Osmundson	2012	2	Asia, North America, Central America
Heimioporus	E.Horak	2004	~15	widespread
Heliogaster	(Kobayasi) Orihara & Iwase	2010	1	Japan
Hemileccinum	Šutara	2008	3	Europe, North America
Hortiboletus	Simonini, Vizzini & Gelardi	2015	4	Europe, North America
Imleria	Vizzini	2014	4	Europe, Asia, North America
Imperator	Assyov et al.	2015	3	Europe, West Asia
Kaziboletus	Iqbal Hosen, Zhu L.Yang	2021	1	South Asia
Lanmaoa	G. Wu, Zhu L. Yang, Halling	2015	>5	East Asia, North America
Leccinellum	Bresinsky & Manfr. Binder	2003	10	widespread
Leccinum	Gray	1821	135	widespread
Mucilopilus	Wolfe	1979	4	North America, New Zealand
Mycoamaranthus	Castellano, Trappe & Malajczuk	1992	3	Australasia, Africa, Southeast Asia
Neoboletus	Gelardi et al.	2014	9	Europe, Asia
Nigroboletus	Gelardi, Vizzini, E. Horak, T.H. Li & Ming Zhang	2015	1	China
Octaviania	Vittad.	1831	15	widespread
Parvixerocomus	G. Wu & Zhu L. Yang,	2015	2	East Asia
Paxillogaster	E.Horak	1966	1	South America
Phylloboletellus	Singer	1952	1	Central and South America
Phyllobolites	Singer	1942	1	South America
Phylloporus	Quel.	1888	~50	cosmopolitan
Pseudoaustroboletus	Yan C. Li & Zhu L. Yang	2014	1	East Asia, South Asia
Pseudoboletus	Šutara	1991	2	north temperate regions
Pulchroboletus	Vizzini, Simonini & Gelardi	2014	1	southern Europe
Pulveroboletus	Murrill	1909	25	cosmopolitan
Retiboletus	Manfr. Binder & Bresinsky	2002	5	north temperate regions
Rheubarbariboletus	Vizzini, Simonini & Gelardi	2015	2	Europe
Rhodactina	Pegler & T.W.K.Young	1989	2	India, Thailand
Rossbeevera	T.Lebel & Orihara	2011	9	Asia, Australia
Royoungia	Castellano, Trappe & Malajczuk	1992	1	Australia
Rubroboletus	Kuan Zhao & Zhu L.Yang	2014	8	Widespread
Rugiboletus	G. Wu & Zhu L. Yang	2015	2	East Asia
Setogyroporus	Heinem. & Rammeloo	1999	1	tropical Africa
Singerocomus	T.W.Henkel & M.E.Sm.	2016	3	??
Singeromyces	M.M.Moser	1966	1	Argentina
Sinoboletus	M.Zang	1992	10	China
Sirindhornea	Lueangjaroenkit et al.	2025	1	Thailand
Solioccasus	Trappe, Osmundson, Manfr.Binder, Castellano & Halling	2013	1	Australasia
Spongiforma	Desjardin, Manf. Binder, Roekring & Flegel	2009	2	Thailand, Malaysia
Strobilomyces	Berk.	1851	~20	cosmopolitan
Suillellus	Murrill	1909	11	North America, Europe
Sutorius	Halling, Nuhn & Fechner	2012	3	North America, Costa Rica, Africa, S.E. Asia, Australia
Tubosaeta	E.Horak	1967	5	Africa, Asia
Tylopilus	P.Karst	1881	111	widespread
Veloporphyrellus	L.D.Gómez & Singer	1984	1	Central America
Wakefieldia	Corner & Hawker	1952	2	Asia, Europe
Xanthoconium	Singer	1944	7	cosmopolitan
Xerocomellus	Šutara	2008	24	North and South America, Europe
Xerocomus	Quel	1887	>20	widespread
Zangia	Yan C.Li & Zhu L.Yang	2011	6	China

(*) Note that the phylogenetic and taxonomic position of many taxa currently remaining in genus Boletus has not yet been clarified. The number of species in this genus will therefore significantly reduce in the following years, as more taxa will be transferred to different genera, or found to be synonyms.

Many other genera formerly part of this family have been moved into other, smaller families, as work with molecular phylogeny shows that they are more distantly related, even if morphologically similar. Representative of this adjustment, is the move of the slimy-capped genus Suillus to the family Suillaceae.

== Distribution ==
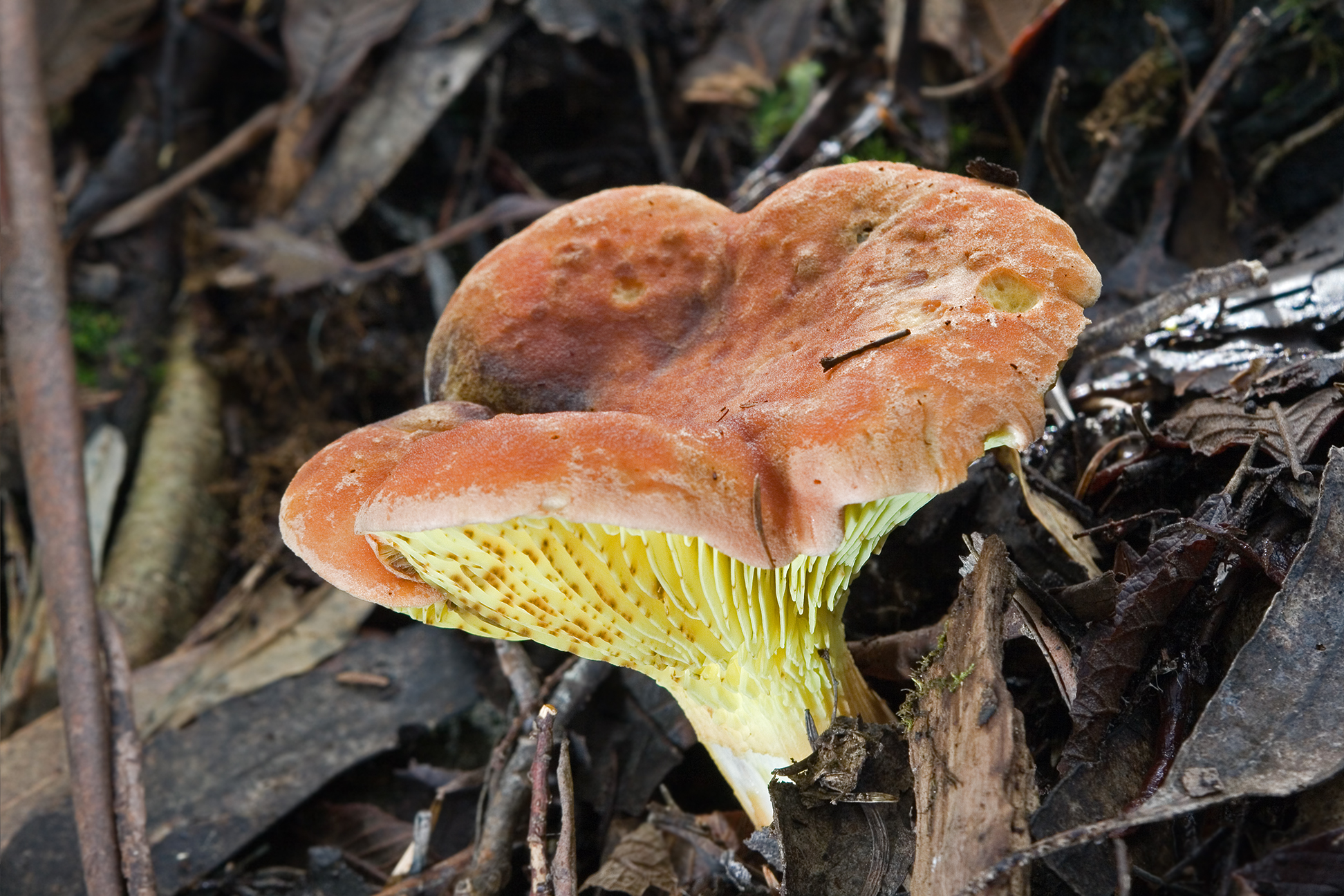
Phylloporus sp. Wielangta Forest, Tasmania

Boletes are found worldwide, on every continent except Antarctica. Well-known and well-described in the temperate latitudes in the northern hemisphere, newer research has shown significant diversity in tropical and southern hemisphere regions as well. E. J. H. Corner found evidence of at least 60 species on the island of Singapore alone. In 1972 he described 140 species from the Malay Peninsula and Borneo and estimated there were at least as many yet to be documented. Over 100 species belonging to 52 genera have been reported from China, which has emerged as one of the worldwide hotspots of Boletaceae diversity. The family is also reasonably well-represented in the Mediterranean region, where many rare or range-restricted species can be found.

== Ecology ==
As heterotrophic organisms, the majority Boletaceae species are symbiotic, and form mutually beneficial ectomycorrhizal associations with various trees and shrubs. However, a number of ancestral species in genera Buchwaldoboletus and Pseudoboletus, are saprotrophic or parasitic. Evidence suggests that some, if not all, species of Chalciporus might also have a mycoparasitic interaction with other fungi. The exact trophic status of some South American and African boletes, such as species of Phylloboletellus, is nonetheless not yet fully clarified, as fruit bodies are often found without the presence of ectomycorrhizal vegetation.

Most frequently associated tree-hosts are members of the Fagaceae, particularly oak (Quercus), beech (Fagus) and chestnut (Castanea). Fewer species are associated with conifers, mostly spruce (Picea) and fir (Abies). In the Mediterranean region, most boletes are strongly associated with evergreen oaks, particularly members of the "Ilex" group, such as the holm oak (Quercus ilex), the kermes oak (Q. coccifera), or the golden oak (Q. alnifolia). Some boletes are also known to grow in association with Cistaceae shrubs, mainly Cistus and Helianthemum, and at least one species (Leccinellum corsicum) is exclusively associated with rockrose.

Most boletes are sensitive to cold and fruit during warm spells in the summer and early months of the autumn, while some have very specific preferences with regards to substrate. For instance, the highly sought after Boletus aereus is mostly found on acidic soils, whereas the poisonous Rubroboletus satanas is predominantly calciphilous and mostly occurs on chalk. Other species, such as Hemileccinum impolitum or Leccinellum lepidum, are indifferent to the substrate and frequently occur on both calcareous and acidic soil.

Boletaceae serve as food for various animals, such as the larvae of the pleasing fungus beetles Tritoma biguttata affinis and Tritoma mimetica. In old sources, such records are often simply ascribed to "Boletus", formerly a "wastebasket genus" collecting any and all "typical" members of this family, and may not always be determinable today.

== Conservation ==
A number of Boletaceae species are considered rare, vulnerable or endangered, and some have been included in regional or national Red Lists. Rubroboletus dupainii is listed among the 33 threatened fungi of Europe, as part of Appendix I of the Bern Convention. Rubroboletus rhodoxanthus is considered extinct in England and critically endangered in the Czech Republic. Also critically endangered in the Czech Republic are Aureoboletus moravicus, Buchwaldoboletus sphaerocephalus, Butyriboletus fuscoroseus, Imperator rhodopurpureus, Leccinum roseotinctum and Rubroboletus rubrosanguineus. Eleven species of Boletaceae, Boletus aereus, Boletus pinophilus, Butyriboletus regius, Hemileccinum impolitum, Imperator luteocupreus, I. rhodopurpureus, I. torosus, Rubroboletus dupainii, R. lupinus, R. pulchrotinctus and R. satanas, are considered vulnerable or endangered in North Macedonia and have been included in the national Red List of fungi. Similarly, twenty species of Boletaceae are included in the Red List of fungi in Bulgaria.

Research from the Mediterranean region suggests that many boletes might be under threat from accelerated climate changes and long-term drought. In a ten-year study from the island of Cyprus, most bolete species were found to be rare, highly restricted by low soil moisture and exhibited very erratic fruiting patterns strongly correlating to annual, late summer and early autumn precipitation.

== Edibility ==
A large number of boletes are edible, few are delicious and some are considered to be true culinary delicacies. The much sought after king bolete (Boletus edulis), in particular, is a species of high commercial value and has been described as "the wild mushroom par excellence". In the Province of Parma in northern Italy, the four most sought after boletes, Boletus edulis, B. aereus, B. reticulatus and B. pinophilus, have been collected and commercially exploited for centuries. Boletes are widely collected and sold in markets throughout Spain, particularly the province of Aragon. Scandinavian cuisine praises boletes. They are a regular feature of Finnish cuisine and, especially the king bolete, is considered an unsurpassed culinary mushroom, widely used in various soups, sauces, casseroles and hotpots. Bolete mushrooms are sometimes also used as pizza topping, not unlike champignons, shiitake, or portobellos.

Two species of Butyriboletus, the royal bolete (B. regius) and the butter bolete (B. appendiculatus) are also culinary valued, though much less common than the ceps. In northern Europe, two of the commonest and most frequently collected edible boletes are the bay bolete (Imleria badia), whose pores bruise blue-green, and the orange birch bolete, which is a Leccinum with an orange cap and which bruises a bluish grey.

Several guidebooks recommend avoiding all red-pored boletes, but both Neoboletus luridiformis (= Neoboletus erythropus) and Suillellus luridus are edible when well-cooked and widely consumed in certain parts of Europe.

=== Lookalikes ===
Poisonous or otherwise inedible species are also present in the family, however, such as the unpalatable bitter species Caloboletus calopus and the aptly named bitter bolete (Tylopilus felleus), as well as some orange-capped species of Leccinum. As the bitter bolete bears a similar resemblance to the king bolete, it may be confused as such. The rule of thumb is that the bitter bolete has pink pores, and a brownish stipe with a dark brown (sometimes approaching black) reticulum, while the cep has whitish pores, which in maturity become yellowish or sometimes with a faint olivaceous tint, a light-colored (white and/or similar in color to the rest of the stipe) reticulum and white hyphae tufts at the base of the stipe. The bitter bolete also lacks the stuffed or plugged pore appearance (caused by a hyphal mat of cheilocystidia) that is common in the cep and its allies. If uncertain, tasting a small piece of cap context should clinch the identification, since Tylopilus felleus has a strong, foul bile-like bitter taste.

== Toxicity ==
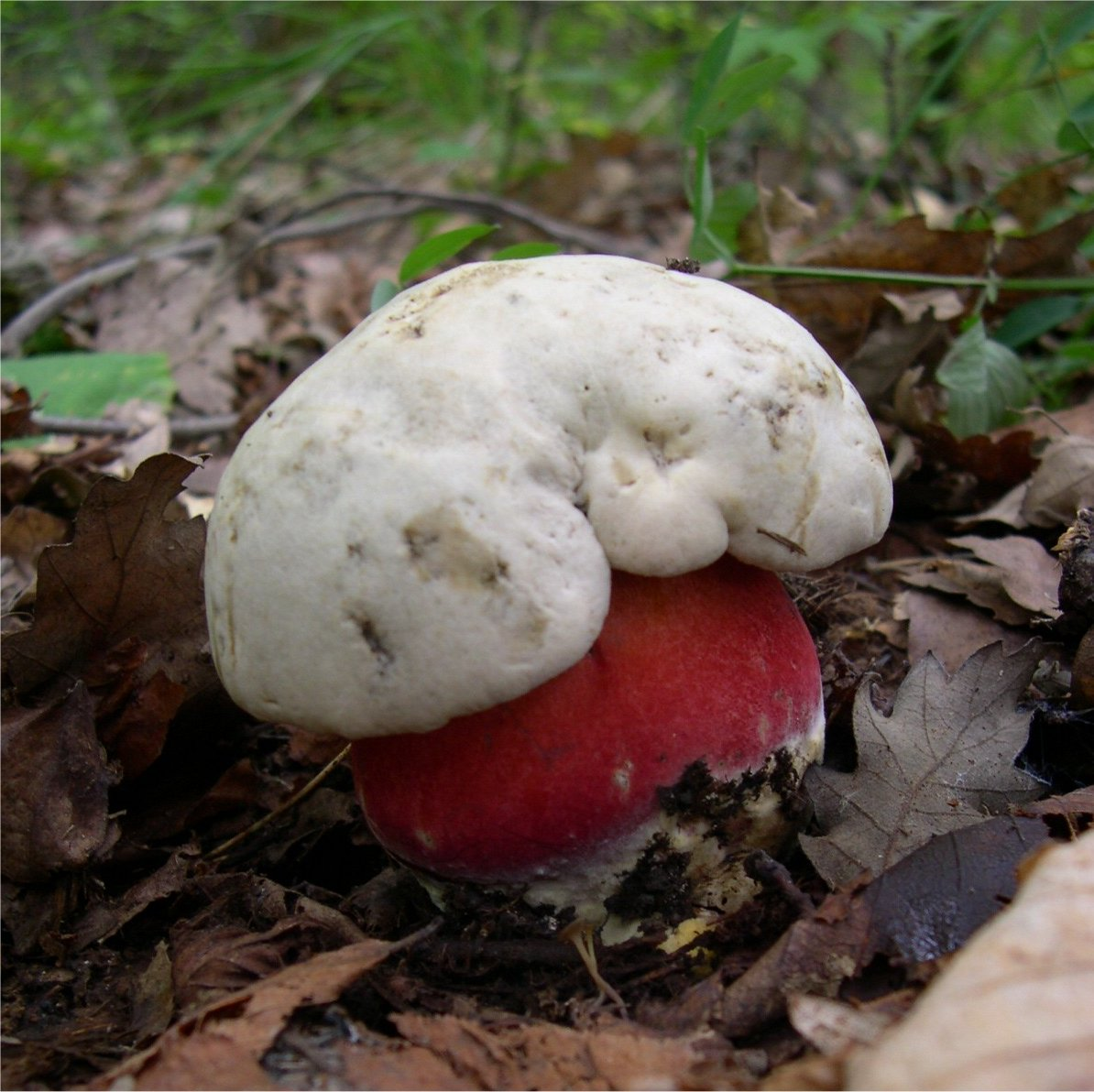
Devil's bolete (Rubroboletus satanas)

Rubroboletus satanas has long been considered to be poisonous, though it is not known to have been responsible for any fatalities and the symptoms are predominantly gastrointestinal in nature. A glycoprotein, bolesatine, is thought to be responsible for the poisonings. When given to mice, Bolesatine causes massive thrombosis, while at lower concentrations it is a mitogen, inducing cell division to human T lymphocytes. A similar compound, bolevenine, has been isolated from the poisonous Neoboletus venenatus in Japan.

More recent studies have associated the poisoning caused by R. satanas with hyperprocalcitonemia, and classified it as a distinct syndrome among fungal poisonings. Several other boletes are known to cause varying degrees of gastrointestinal symptoms, especially if eaten raw or insufficiently cooked.

One incident of death associated with Rubroboletus pulcherrimus was reported in 1994; a couple developed gastrointestinal symptoms after eating this fungus, with the husband finally succumbing. An autopsy revealed infarction of the midgut.

== See also ==
- Bolete eater
- List of North American boletes
