= Cryptoporus sinensis =

Scientific classification
- Domain: Eukaryota
- Kingdom: Fungi
- Division: Basidiomycota
- Class: Agaricomycetes
- Order: Polyporales
- Family: Polyporaceae
- Genus: Cryptoporus
- Species: C. sinensis

Binomial name
- Cryptoporus sinensis Sheng H.Wu & M.Zang (2000)

Species of fungus

Cryptoporus sinensis is a polypore fungus found in central and southern provinces of China. It was described as a new species in 2000 by mycologists Sheng H. Wu and Mu Zang. It is distinguished from the more widespread Cryptoporus volvatus by its smaller spores, which measure 7.5–10 by 4–5 μm.
