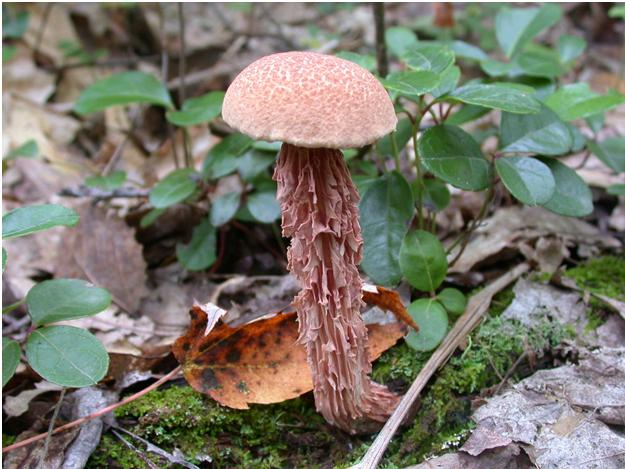

Scientific classification
- Kingdom: Fungi
- Division: Basidiomycota
- Class: Agaricomycetes
- Order: Boletales
- Family: Boletaceae
- Genus: Aureoboletus
- Species: A. russellii

Binomial name
- Aureoboletus russellii (Frost) G. Wu & Zhu L. Yang (2016)

Synonyms
- Boletus russellii Frost (1878); Ceriomyces russellii (Frost) Murrill (1909); Boletellus russellii (Frost) E.J. Gilbert (1931); Frostiella russellii (Frost) Murrill (1942)

= Aureoboletus russellii =

Species of fungus

Aureoboletus russellii
- Mycological characteristics
- Pores on hymenium
- Cap is convex
- Hymenium is adnate
- Stipe is bare
- Spore print is olive
- Ecology is mycorrhizal
- Edibility is edible

Aureoboletus russellii, commonly known as the jagged-stemmed bolete or Russell's bolete, is a species of bolete fungus in the family Boletaceae. The fruit bodies are characterized by their coarsely shaggy stem. The yellow-brown to reddish-brown caps are initially velvety, but become cracked into patches with age.

An edible species, it is found in Asia and eastern North America, where it grows in a mycorrhizal association with oak, hemlock, and pine trees.

== Taxonomy ==
Originally named Boletus russellii by Charles Christopher Frost in 1878 from collections made in New England, the species was transferred to Boletellus by Edouard-Jean Gilbert in 1931. It was then transferred to Aureoboletus by Gang Wu and Zhu L. Yang in 2016. The specific epithet russellii honors American botanist and Unitarian minister John Lewis Russell, the first collector of the species. Common names given to the mushroom include shagnet, jagged-stem bolete, and Russell's bolete.

== Description ==
The cap is hemispheric to convex or broadly convex, reaching a diameter of 3–13 cm (1 1/4–5 in). The cap surface is initially velvety, with a margin rolled inward, but after maturing the cap becomes cracked and forms scale-like patches. The color is yellow-brown to reddish-brown to olive-gray, while the flesh is pale yellow to yellow. The pore surface is yellow to greenish yellow; when the pore surface is rubbed or injured it will turn a brighter yellow color. The pores are angular, and about 1 mm wide, while the tubes that comprise the pores are up to 2 cm (3/4 in) deep.

The stem is up to 20 cm (8 in) long and 1–2 cm (3/8–3/4 in) thick, and either roughly equal in width throughout, or slightly thicker at the base. Reddish brown to pinkish tan in color, the stem is solid (i.e. not hollow or stuffed with a pith), sometimes curved and viscid at the base. The surface texture is characterized by deep grooves and ridges, with the ridges torn and branched so as to appear shaggy. No partial veil or ring are present.

The spore print is olive brown. The spores are ellipsoid, measuring 15–20 by 7–11 μm. Similar to the reticulation of the stem, the spore surfaces have deep longitudinal grooves and furrows, sometimes with a cleft in the wall at the top of the spore.

=== Similar species ===
Aureoboletus betula is somewhat similar in stature and also has a deeply reticulate stem, but can be distinguished by its smooth, shinier cap and spores with pits. Boletellus ananas is somewhat similar.

== Habitat and distribution ==
Aureoboletus russellii is known from eastern North America, where it grows singly or scattered on the ground in association with oak, hemlock, and pine trees. The geographic range extends from eastern Canada south to Central America, and west to Michigan and southern Arizona. It is also found in Asia, including Korea and Taiwan.

== Uses ==
The fruit bodies are edible, but of low culinary interest due to being soft and little flavour.

== See also ==
- List of North American boletes
