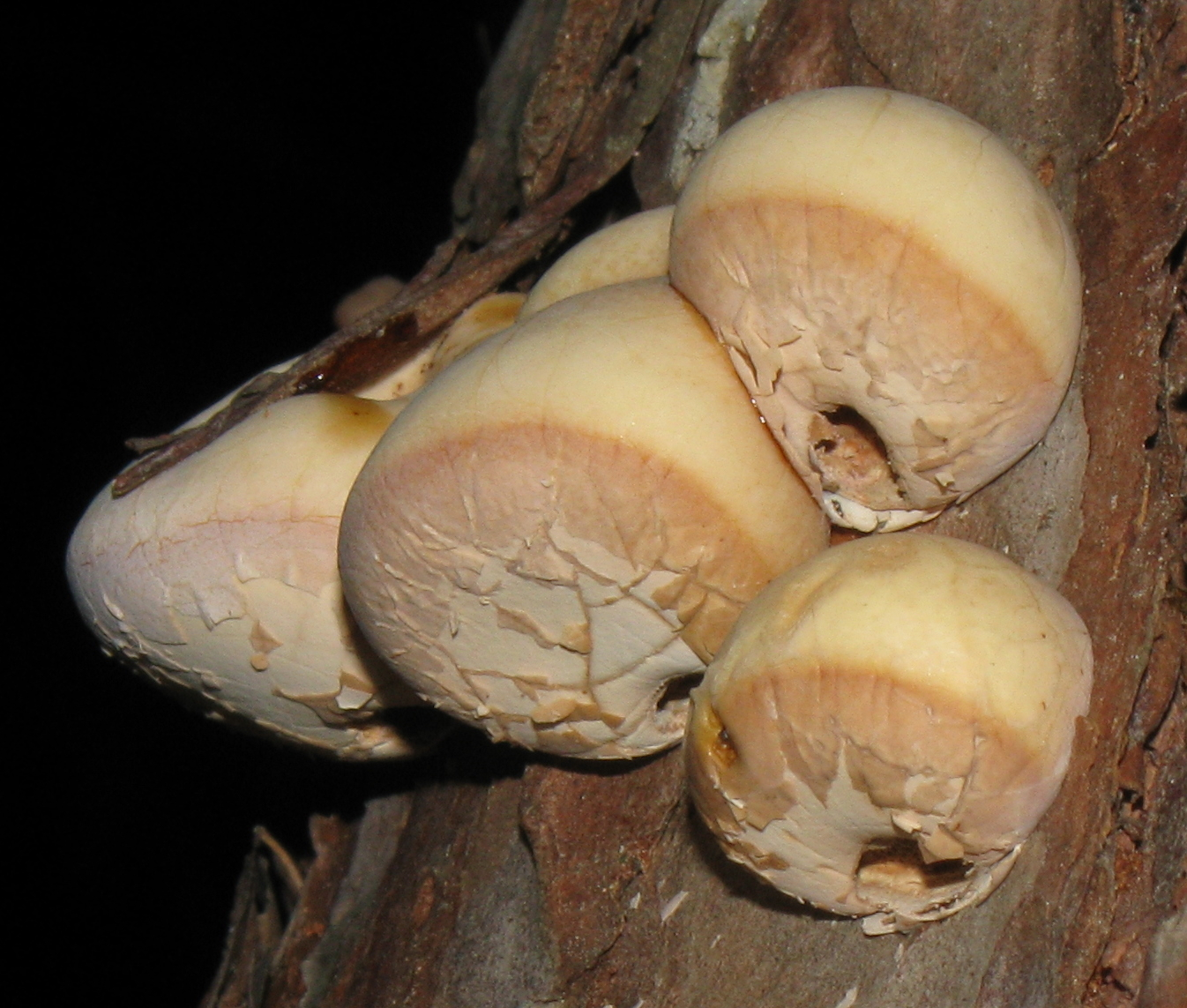
- Cryptoporus volvatus

Scientific classification
- Domain: Eukaryota
- Kingdom: Fungi
- Division: Basidiomycota
- Class: Agaricomycetes
- Order: Polyporales
- Family: Polyporaceae
- Genus: Cryptoporus (Peck) Shear (1902)

Type species
- Cryptoporus volvatus (Peck) Shear (1902)

Species
- Cryptoporus sinensis Cryptoporus volvatus

Synonyms
- Polyporus sect. Cryptoporus Peck (1880)

= Cryptoporus =

Genus of fungi

Cryptoporus is a genus of fungi in the family Polyporaceae. Originally described as a section of Polyporus by Charles Horton Peck in 1880, Cornelius Lott Shear made it a distinct genus in 1902. Cryptoporus contains two species, C. sinensis and the type C. volvatus, found in southeast Asia and North America, respectively. C. sinensis is morphologically indistinguishable from C. volvatus except for its smaller spores (7.5–10 by 4–5 μm compared to 10–12.5 by 5–6 μm. The generic name combines the Ancient Greek words κρυπτός ("hidden") and πόρος ("pore").
