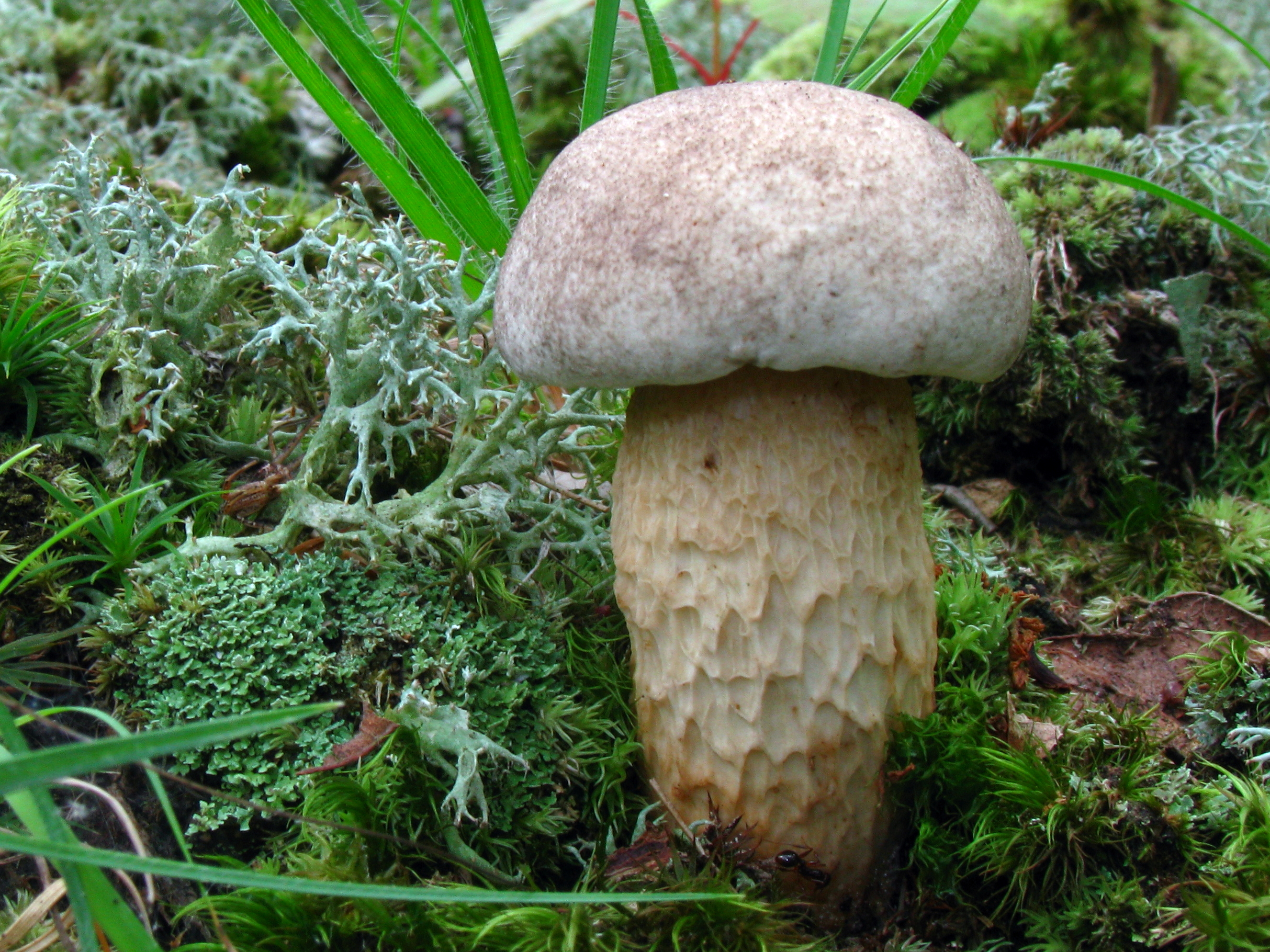

Scientific classification
- Kingdom: Fungi
- Division: Basidiomycota
- Class: Agaricomycetes
- Order: Boletales
- Family: Boletaceae
- Genus: Retiboletus
- Species: R. griseus

Binomial name
- Retiboletus griseus (Frost) Manfr. Binder & Bresinsky (2002)

Synonyms
- Boletus griseus Frost (1878); Ceriomyces griseus (Frost) Murrill (1909); Xerocomus griseus (Frost) Singer (1942); Tubiporus griseus (Frost) S.Imai (1968)

= Retiboletus griseus =

Species of fungus

Retiboletus griseus Mycological characteristics
- Pores on hymenium
- Cap is convex
- Spore print is yellow-brown
- Ecology is mycorrhizal
- Edibility is edible

Retiboletus griseus, commonly known as the gray bolete, is a species of bolete fungus in the family Boletaceae.

== Taxonomy ==
The species was first described scientifically in 1878 by American botanist Charles Christopher Frost. It was transferred to Retiboletus in 2002.

== Description ==
The grayish cap is convex, 4–10 centimetres (1 1/2–4 in) wide, and soft or leathery. The stem is yellowish, 4–10 cm tall and 1–3 cm (1/2–1 1/4 in) thick. The flesh is whitish and can stain tannish. The spore print is olive brown.

=== Similar species ===
Lookalikes include R. vinaceipes, Tylopilus griseocarneus, T. variobrunneus, and Leccinum albellum.

== Habitat and distribution ==
Retiboletus griseus can be found under oak trees in eastern North America from June to September.

== Uses ==
The species is edible but often infested with worms.
