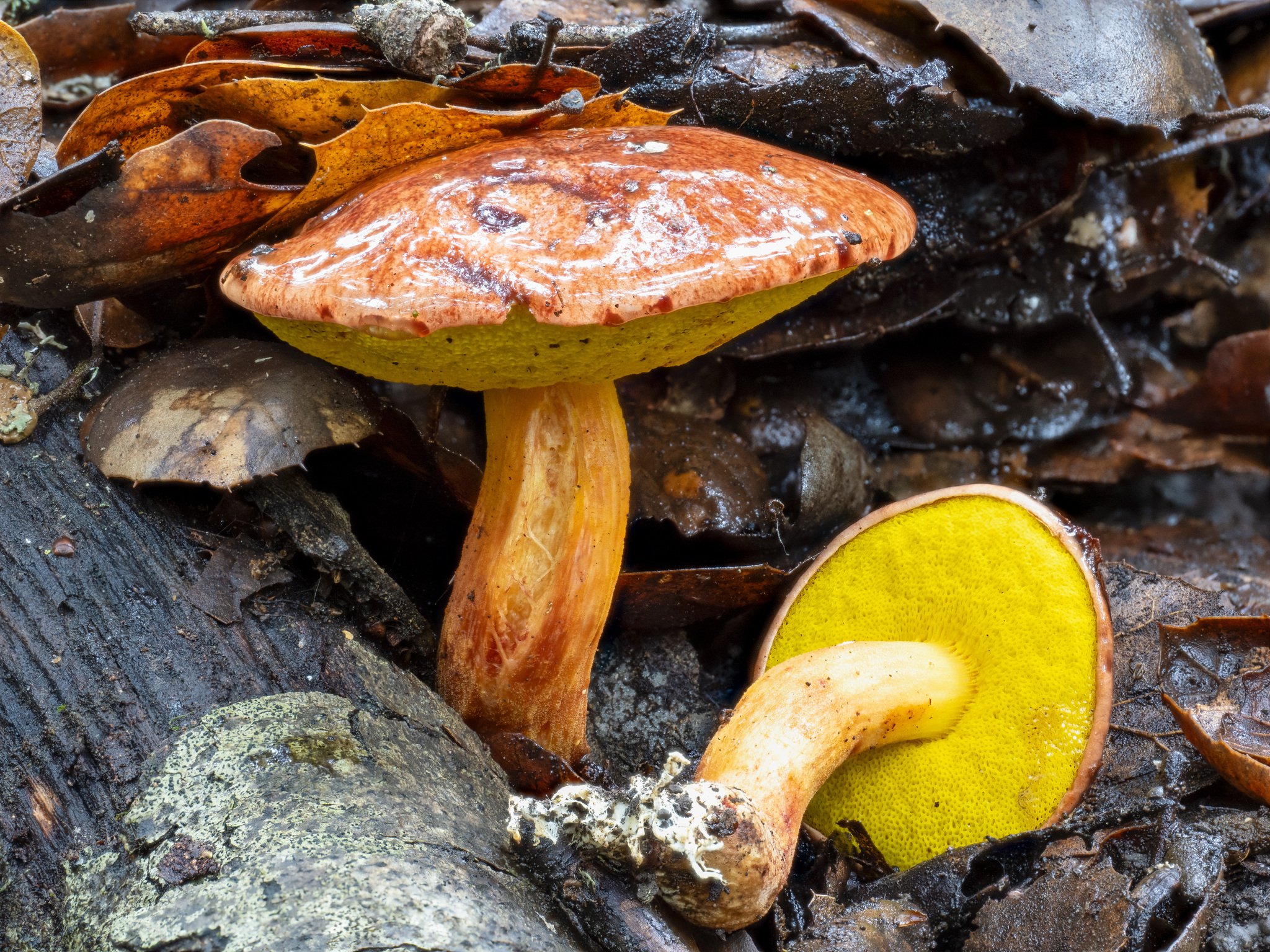
- California, 2023, by Alan Rockefeller

Conservation status
- Least Concern (IUCN 3.1)

Scientific classification
- Kingdom: Fungi
- Division: Basidiomycota
- Class: Agaricomycetes
- Order: Boletales
- Family: Boletaceae
- Genus: Aureoboletus
- Species: A. flaviporus

Binomial name
- Aureoboletus flaviporus (Earle), Klofac (2010)

Synonyms
- Boletus flaviporus Earle (1905); Ceriomyces flaviporus (Earle) Murrill (1909); Xerocomus flaviporus (Earle) Singer (1942); Pulveroboletus flaviporus (Earle) Singer (1947)

= Aureoboletus flaviporus =

Species of fungus

Aureoboletus flaviporus Mycological characteristics
- Pores on hymenium
- Cap is convex
- Hymenium is adnate
- Stipe is bare
- Spore print is olive-brown
- Ecology is mycorrhizal
- Edibility is edible

Aureoboletus flaviporus, commonly known as the viscid bolete, is a species of bolete fungus. From 1905 until 2010, its binomial name was Boletus flaviporus.

== Description ==
The reddish-brown cap is convex, sticky-slimy, and up to 15 cm (6 in) wide. The pores are neon yellow. The stem is up to 15 cm long and 3 cm thick. The flesh does not stain blue when damaged. It has an acidic and lemony flavour. The spore print is olive-brown.

=== Similar species ===
Aureoboletus auriporus is the most similar species in the genus. A. viridiflavus is similar as well.

== Distribution and habitat ==
The species is found in western North America, where it grows in ectomycorrhizal association with coast live oak, madrone, manzanita, and possibly with tanoak. In California, this mushroom appears during the rainy season (November to February) as far north as Mendocino County. The species is common but does not appear in large groupings, only as one-offs or small clusters in scattered locations.

== Uses ==
The quality of the edible mushroom has been described as mediocre because of poor flavor and texture.

== See also ==
- Oak-loving bolete
- List of North American boletes
