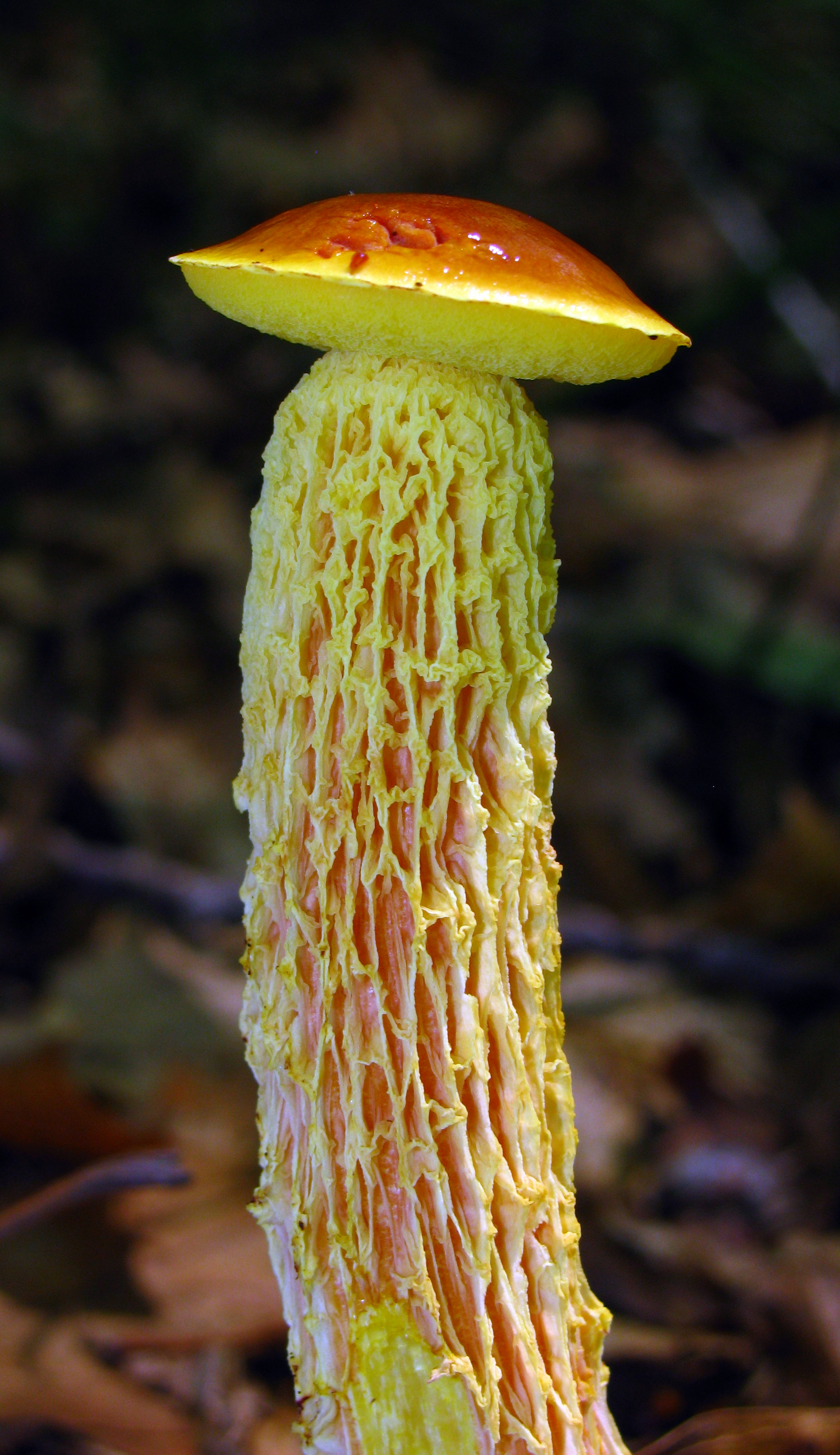
- Heimioporus betula

Scientific classification
- Kingdom: Fungi
- Division: Basidiomycota
- Class: Agaricomycetes
- Order: Boletales
- Family: Boletaceae
- Genus: Heimioporus; E.Horak (2004)

Type species
- Heimioporus retisporus (Pat. & C.F.Baker) E.Horak (2004)

Species
- 15, see text

Synonyms
- Heimiella Boedijn (1951)

= Heimioporus =

Genus of fungi

Heimioporus is a genus of fungi in the family Boletaceae. The genus is widely distributed in tropical and subtropical regions, and contains about 15 species.

The genus name of Heimioporus is in honour of Roger Jean Heim (1900-1979), who was a French botanist (Mycology) and Director of the National Museum of Natural History, France in Paris.

The genus was circumscribed by Egon Horak in Sydowia vol.56 on page 237 in 2004.

== Species ==
- Heimioporus alveolatus
- Heimioporus anguiformis
- Heimioporus australis
- Heimioporus betula
- Heimioporus cooloolae
- Heimioporus fruticicola
- Heimioporus ivoryi
- Heimioporus japonicus
- Heimioporus kinabaluensis
- Heimioporus mandarinus
- Heimioporus mirabilis
- Heimioporus nigricans
- Heimioporus punctisporus
- Heimioporus retisporus
- Heimioporus ridleyi
- Heimioporus rubropunctus
- Heimioporus subretisporus
- Heimioporus xerampelinus
