= Gymnopilus dulongjiangensis =

Scientific classification
- Kingdom: Fungi
- Division: Basidiomycota
- Class: Agaricomycetes
- Order: Agaricales
- Family: Hymenogastraceae
- Genus: Gymnopilus
- Species: G. dulongjiangensis

Binomial name
- Gymnopilus dulongjiangensis M.Zang (1987)

Species of fungus

Gymnopilus dulongjiangensis is a species of mushroom in the family Hymenogastraceae. Found in China, it was described as new to science in 1987 by Mu Zang.

== See also ==
- List of Gymnopilus species
