= Aureoboletus zangii =

Scientific classification
- Domain: Eukaryota
- Kingdom: Fungi
- Division: Basidiomycota
- Class: Agaricomycetes
- Order: Boletales
- Family: Boletaceae
- Genus: Aureoboletus
- Species: A. zangii

Binomial name
- Aureoboletus zangii X.F.Shi & P.G.Liu (2013)

Species of fungus

Aureoboletus zangii is a species of bolete fungus in the family Boletaceae. It is found in Shaanxi, China, where it grows on the ground in broad-leaved mixed forests dominated by Cyclobalanopsis and Quercus. Fruitbodies are characterized in the field by the yellow-brown to reddish-golden colours, and sticky cap and stipe. Similar species include the Asian species A. thibetanus and the European A. gentilis.

The bolete was described as new to science in 2013 by Xiao-Fei Shi and Pei-Gui Liu. The specific epithet honours Chinese mycologist and bolete specialist Mu Zang.
