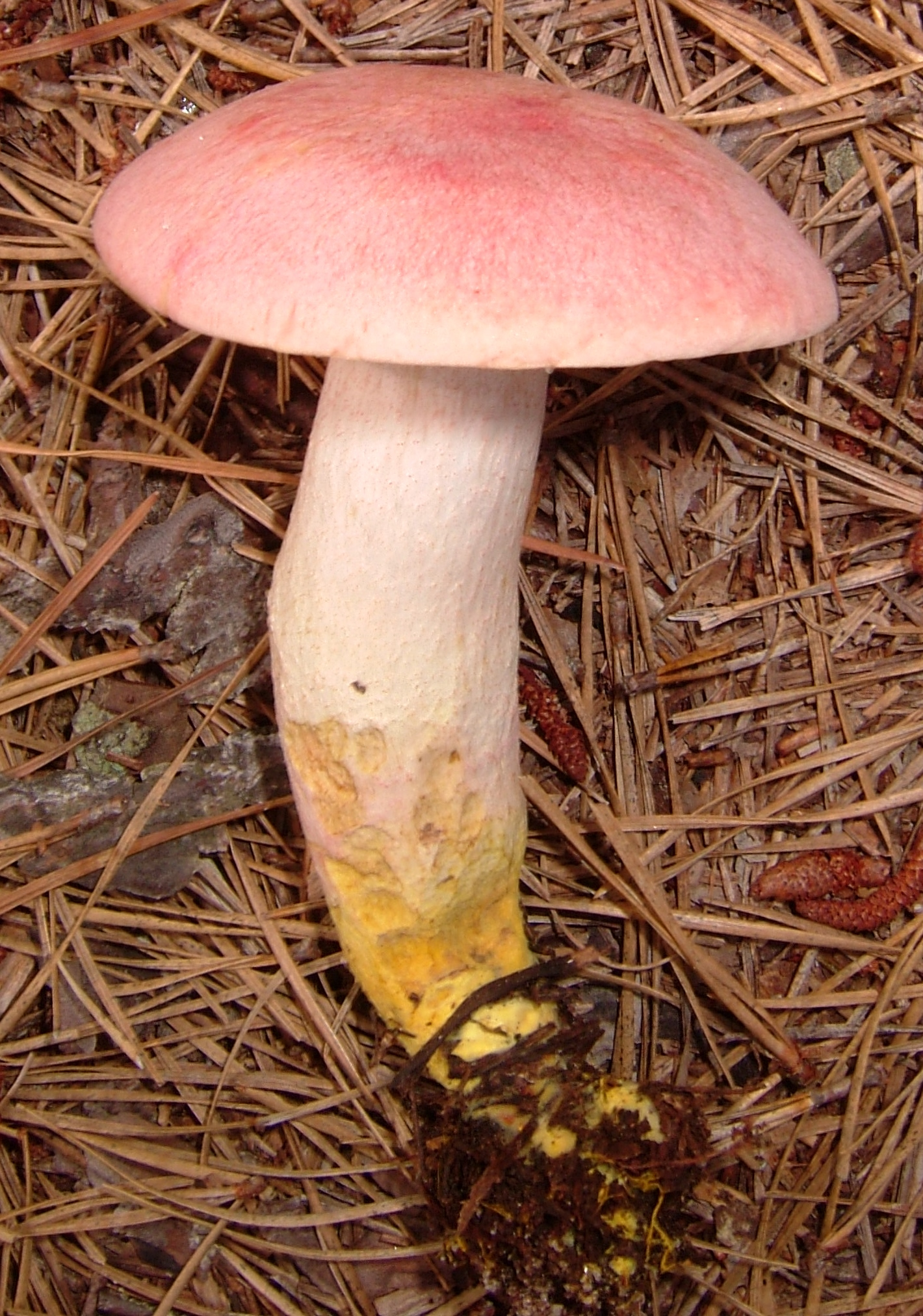
- Harrya chromapes

Scientific classification
- Kingdom: Fungi
- Division: Basidiomycota
- Class: Agaricomycetes
- Order: Boletales
- Family: Boletaceae
- Genus: Harrya; Halling, Nuhn & Osmundson (2012)

Type species
- Harrya chromapes (Frost) Halling, Nuhn, Osmundson, & Manfr.Binder (2012)

= Harrya =

Genus of fungi

Harrya is a fungal genus in the family Boletaceae. It was circumscribed in 2012 to contain the species Harrya atriceps and the type Harrya chromapes.

The genus name of Harrya is in honour of Harry Delbert Thiers (1919–2000), who was an American mycologist who studied and named many fungi native to North America, particularly California.

== Species ==
As accepted by Species Fungorum;

Image	Scientific name	Taxon author	Year	Distribution
	Harrya alpina	Y.C. Li & Zhu L. Yang	2016	
	Harrya atriceps	Halling, G.M. Muell. & Osmundson	2012	Costa Rica
	Harrya atrogrisea	Y.C. Li & Zhu L. Yang	2016	
	Harrya chromapes	(Frost) Halling, Nuhn, Osmundson & Manfr. Binder	2012	
	Harrya moniliformis	Y.C. Li & Zhu L. Yang	2016	
	Harrya subalpina	Y.C. Li & Zhu L. Yang	2016	
