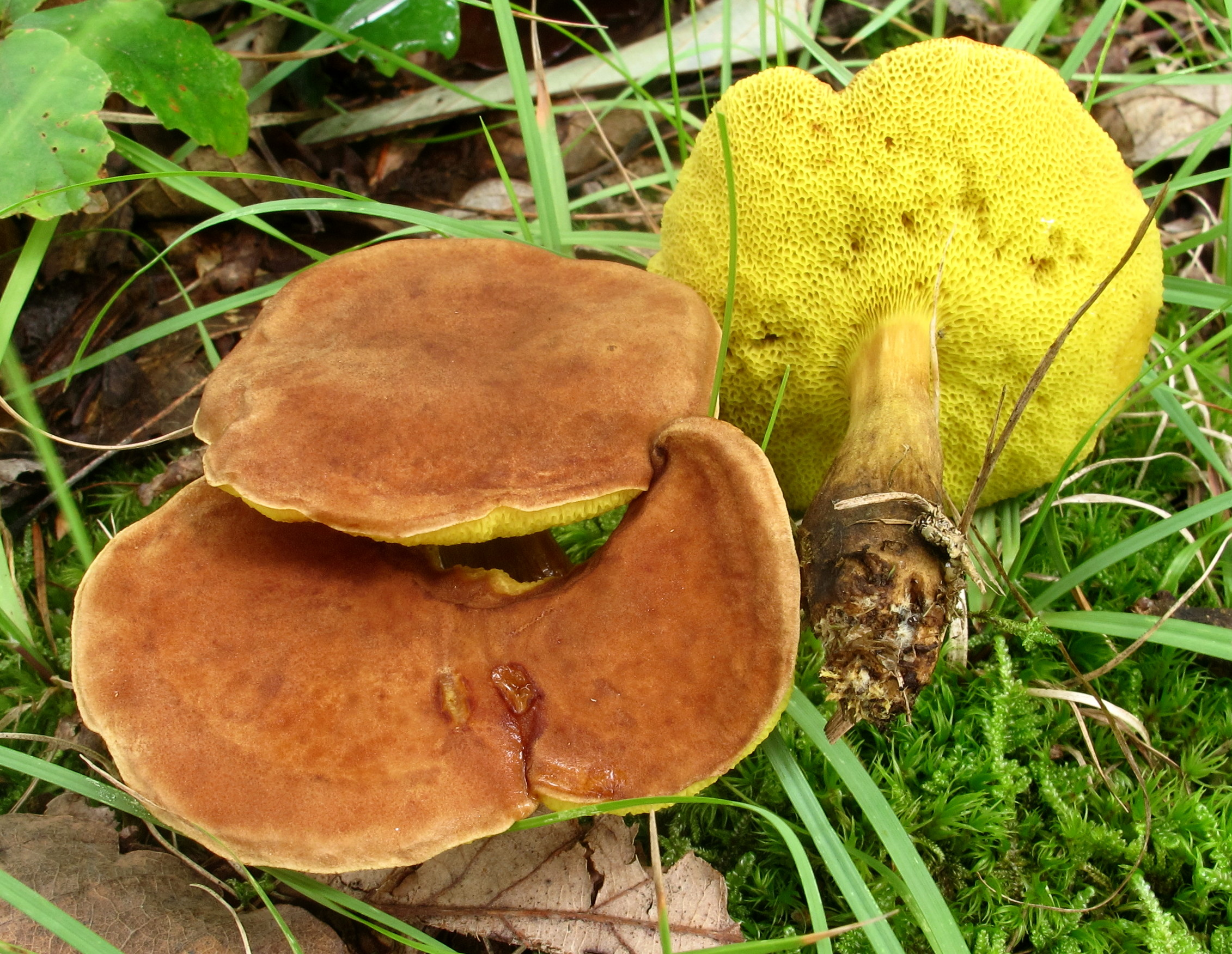

Scientific classification
- Domain: Eukaryota
- Kingdom: Fungi
- Division: Basidiomycota
- Class: Agaricomycetes
- Order: Boletales
- Family: Boletaceae
- Genus: Aureoboletus
- Species: A. innixus

Binomial name
- Aureoboletus innixus (Frost) Halling, A.R. Bessette & A.E. Bessette (2015)

Synonyms
- Boletus innixus Frost (1874); Pulveroboletus innixus (Frost) Singer (1986)

= Aureoboletus innixus =

Species of fungus

Aureoboletus innixus is a species of bolete fungus in the family Boletaceae. Found in eastern North America, it was first described scientifically by Charles Christopher Frost in 1874, from collections made in New England. An edible mushroom, the convex cap grows to 3–8 cm (1.2–3.1 in) wide and is dull reddish brown to yellow brown. The stem is 3–6 cm (1.2–2.4 in) long by 1–1.6 cm (0.4–0.6 in) thick, but often swollen at the apex with a tapered base. It has a bright yellow pore surface when young that dulls in color when mature. There are about 1 to 3 pores per mm when young, but they expand as they mature to about 2 mm wide. The spore print is olive-brown, and the spores are ellipsoid, smooth, and measure 8–11 by 3–5 um.

The mushroom is often confused with the similar (also edible) Aureoboletus auriporus, which has a pinkish cinnamon to dark reddish brown cap.

== See also ==
- List of North American boletes
