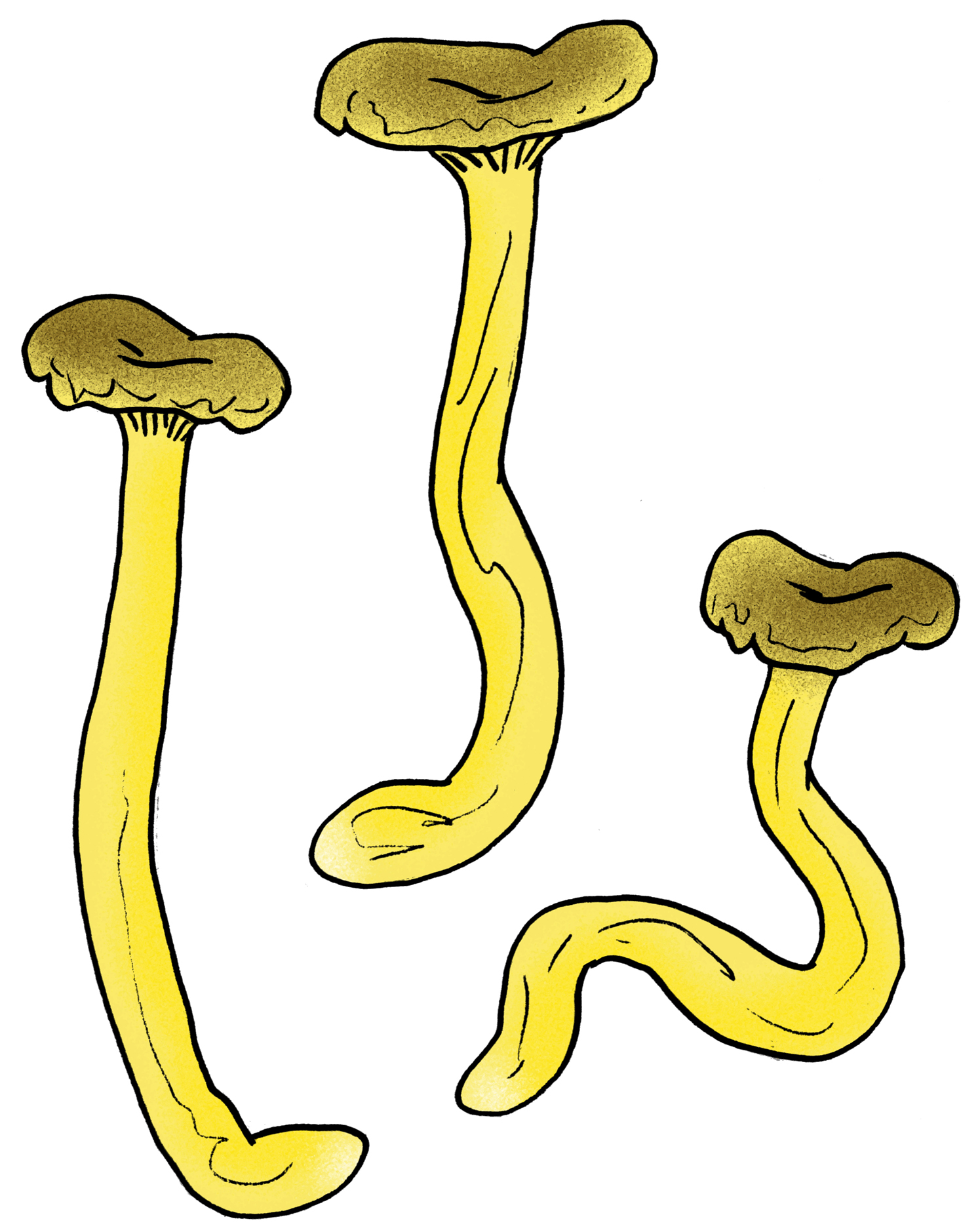
- Drawing of mature fruiting bodies

Scientific classification
- Domain: Eukaryota
- Kingdom: Fungi
- Division: Basidiomycota
- Class: Agaricomycetes
- Order: Cantharellales
- Family: Cantharellaceae
- Genus: Cantharellus
- Species: C. zangii

Binomial name
- Cantharellus zangii X.F.Tian, P.G.Liu & Buyck (2012)
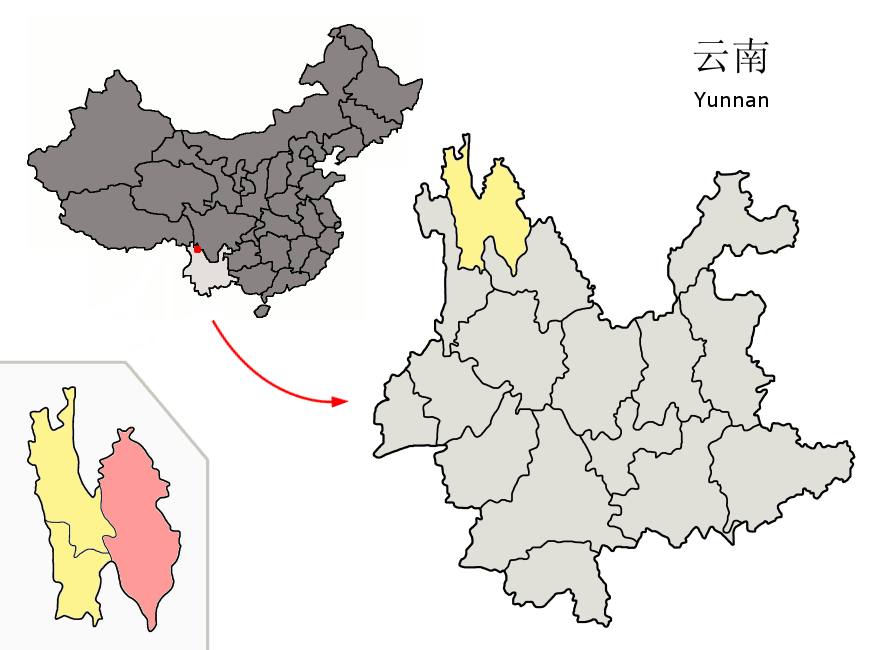
- Known only from a small region in Shangri-La County (shown in pink), Yunnan, China

= Cantharellus zangii =

Species of fungus

Cantharellus zangii is a species of fungus in the family Cantharellaceae. Described as new to science in 2012, it is found only in a small area in northwestern Yunnan, China. The fungus produces small, ochre to ochre-yellow fruit bodies (mushrooms) with thin flesh and a long tapering stipe. Microscopically, the mushroom features thin-walled hyphae with clamp connections, and large ellipsoid-shaped spores.

== Taxonomy ==
Cantharellus zangii was described in 2012 in the scientific journal Mycotaxon by Xiao-Fei Tian and colleagues. The type collection was made in August 2008 in the Bitahai National Natural Reserve, located in Shangri-La County, Yunnan, China. The authors classify the fungus in Parvocantharellus, a subgenus of Craterellus that was originally proposed by Guillaume Eyssartier and Bart Buyck in 2001. The specific epithet zangii honors Chinese mycologist Zang Mu, founder of the Cryptogamic Herbarium in the Kunming Institute of Botany.

== Description ==
Fruit bodies have caps ranging in shape from umbonate to flat to slightly concave, reaching a diameter of 2–3 cm (3/4–1 1/4 in). The cap is smooth with an ochre to yellow colour. Initially curved inward, the cap margin eventually straightens in maturity. The golden-colored gills, which have a decurrent attachment to the stipe, are up to 2 mm high with a 1–2 mm spacing between them. They are connected by transverse cross-veins. There are short, branched gills near the cap edge. The dark orange-yellow to orange stipe measures 7–8 cm (2 3/4–3 1/4 in) long by 0.3–0.4 cm thick. It is hollow and sometimes slightly curved. The thin flesh has a mild taste and an odor similar to Osmanthus flowers.

Spores are ellipsoid, thin-walled, and hyaline (translucent), measuring 8.5–11 by 5–6.5 μm. They sometimes have multiple tiny oil droplets. Basidia (spore-bearing cells) are slender and club-shaped, usually five-spored (sometimes six) with sterigmata 5–6 μm long, and dimensions of 75–85 by 6–9 μm. All hyphae have distinct clamp connections.

=== Similar species ===
Similar species include the European Cantharellus queletii, but this mushroom can be distinguished by its solid stipe and the lack of cross-veins between the gills. Another European species, Craterellus tubaeformis, has a horn-shaped fruit body with depressed caps, and grey or greyish-white gills.

== Habitat and distribution ==
The fruit bodies of Cantharellus zangii grow on the ground singly or in groups in mixed forests. The predominant trees are Larix potaninii var. macrocarpa and Picea likiangensis. The species has been collected from only the type locality and from nearby locales in Shangri-La County (northwestern Yunnan). The habitat is subalpine, at elevations of about 3,000 m (9,800 ft). The type locality, Bitahai National Natural Reserve, is a highly biodiverse area and has the highest elevation and highest latitude of all wetland reserves in Yunnan.
