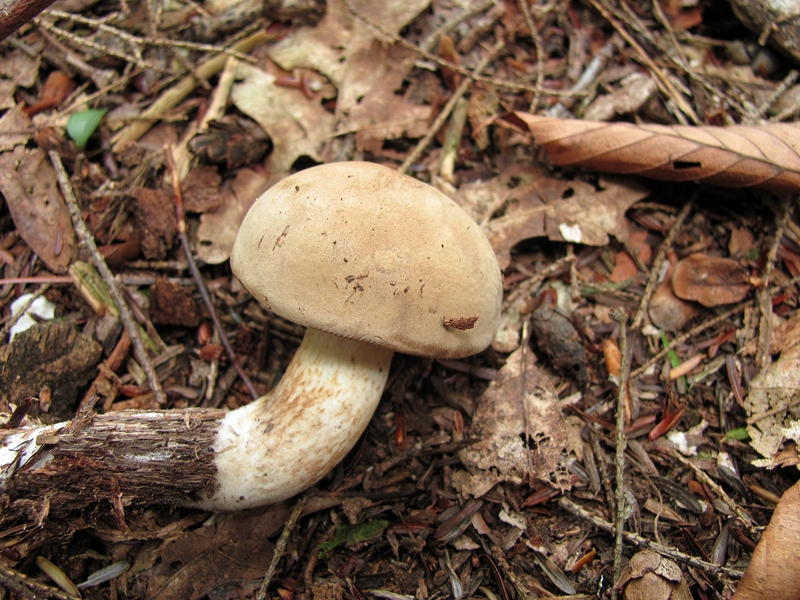

Scientific classification
- Domain: Eukaryota
- Kingdom: Fungi
- Division: Basidiomycota
- Class: Agaricomycetes
- Order: Boletales
- Family: Boletaceae
- Genus: Boletus
- Species: B. pallidus

Binomial name
- Boletus pallidus Frost (1874)

Synonyms
- Ceriomyces pallidus (Frost) Murrill (1909)

= Boletus pallidus =

Species of fungus

Boletus pallidus is an edible species of bolete fungus. It was described by Charles Christopher Frost in 1874. The bolete was reported from a Mexican beech (Fagus mexicana) forest in Hidalgo, Mexico in 2010.

== See also ==
- List of Boletus species
- List of North American boletes
