= Harrya atriceps =

Scientific classification
- Domain: Eukaryota
- Kingdom: Fungi
- Division: Basidiomycota
- Class: Agaricomycetes
- Order: Boletales
- Family: Boletaceae
- Genus: Harrya
- Species: H. atriceps

Binomial name
- Harrya atriceps Halling, G.M.Muell., & Osmundson (2012)

Species of fungus

Harrya atriceps is a rare species of bolete fungus. Described as new to science in 2012, it is found in the Cordillera Talamanca of Costa Rica, where it grows in a mycorrhizal association with the oak species Quercus copeyensis and Quercus seemannii. Compared to its much more common and widespread relative, Harrya chromapes, H. atriceps has a black cap and lacks pinkish colors in its stipe scabers, but it does have a yellowish stipe base. Its smooth, fusoid spores measure 9.1–11.9 by 4.2–6.3 μm.
