= Heimioporus retisporus =

Scientific classification
- Kingdom: Fungi
- Division: Basidiomycota
- Class: Agaricomycetes
- Order: Boletales
- Family: Boletaceae
- Genus: Heimioporus
- Species: H. retisporus

Binomial name
- Heimioporus retisporus (Pat. & C.F. Baker) E.Horak

Species of fungus

Heimioporus retisporus is a species of bolete fungus found in China. It is the type species of the genus Heimioporus.
