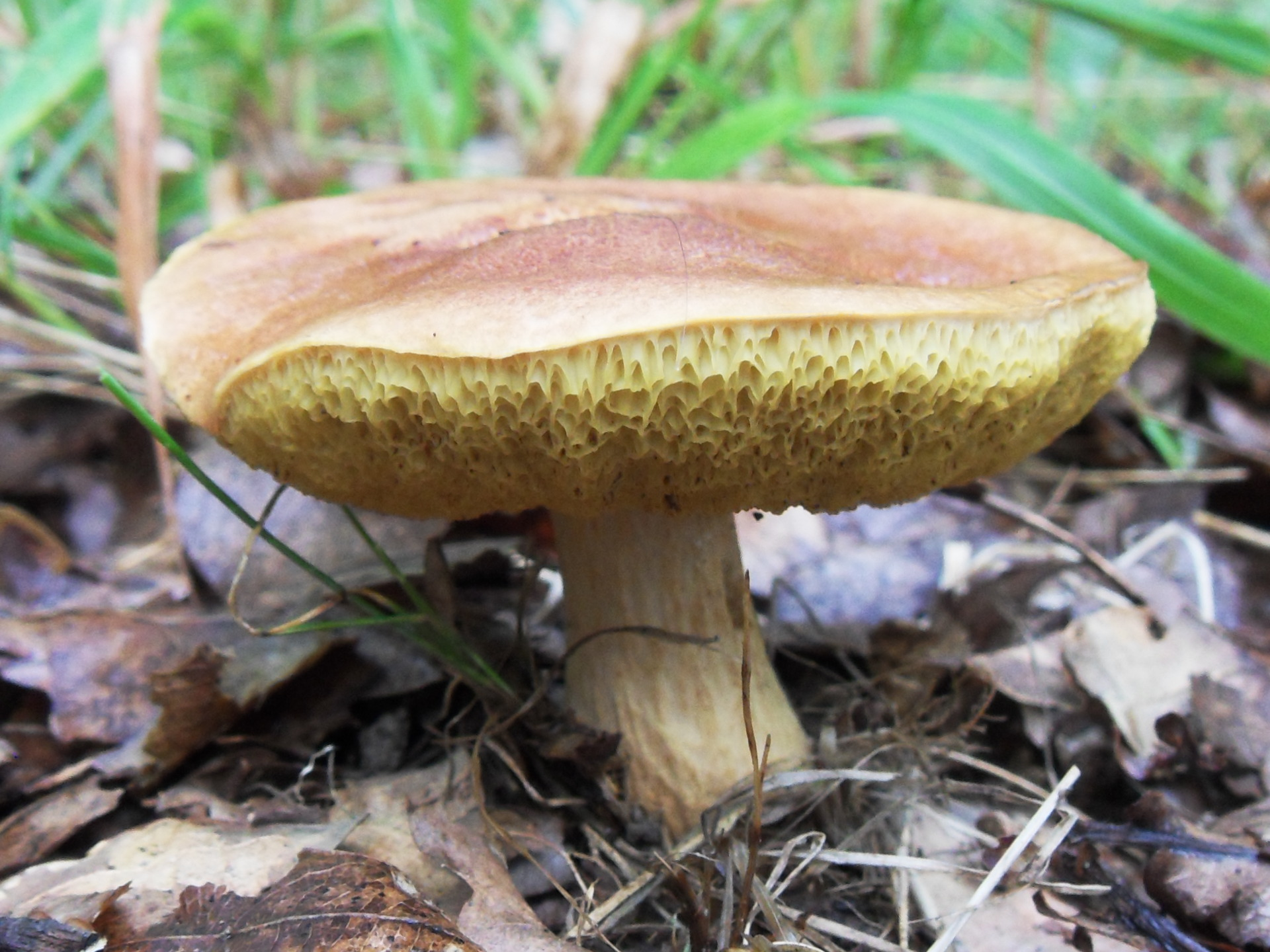

Scientific classification
- Kingdom: Fungi
- Division: Basidiomycota
- Class: Agaricomycetes
- Order: Boletales
- Family: Boletaceae
- Genus: Aureoboletus
- Species: A. moravicus

Binomial name
- Aureoboletus moravicus (Vacek) W.Klofac (2010)

Synonyms
- Boletus moravicus Vacek (1946); Xerocomus moravicus (Vacek) Herink (1964); Boletus leonis D.A.Reid (1966); Xerocomus leonis (D.A.Reid) Alessio (1985)

= Aureoboletus moravicus =

Species of bolete fungus

Aureoboletus moravicus
- Mycological characteristics
- Pores on hymenium
- Cap is convex
- Hymenium is adnate
- Stipe is bare
- Spore print is yellow
- Ecology is mycorrhizal
- Edibility is edible

Aureoboletus moravicus, commonly known as the tawny bolete, is a species of bolete fungus in the family Boletaceae that is found in Europe. It is an uncommon bolete of unknown edibility that appears as a vulnerable species on some European Red Lists, and is considered critically endangered in the Czech Republic. Preferred habitats include parklands, near oak trees.

== Taxonomy ==
Originally described as Boletus moravicus by Václav Vacek in 1946, it was transferred to the genus Aureoboletus by Wolfgang Klofac in 2010.

== Habitat and distribution ==
Aureoboletus moravicus is confined to warm‐temperate deciduous woodlands on volcanic (andesitic) substrates with very acidic to mildly acidic soils (pH 3.9–6.3), frequently underlaid by [[[loess]] deposits. In Slovakia, surveys have uncovered populations in the Štiavnica Mountains and Kremnica Mountains as well as the Zvolenská kotlina basin, at elevations between 210 and 518 m above sea level. These sites are characterised by xerophilous oak‐dominated stands—principally Quercus cerris, Q. petraea and Q. robur—often mixed with hornbeam (Carpinus betulus) and occasionally beech (Fagus sylvatica).

Across Europe, A. moravicus is only known from scattered localities in central and southern temperate regions. It is red‑listed or legally protected in several countries (for example Slovakia, the Czech Republic, Denmark, Bulgaria, Switzerland, Croatia and Austria) owing to its rarity and narrow ecological requirements. Fruiting bodies appear singly or in small groups from July to October, typically on south‐facing or south‑west‑facing slopes in thermophilous (warm-loving) forest communities.
