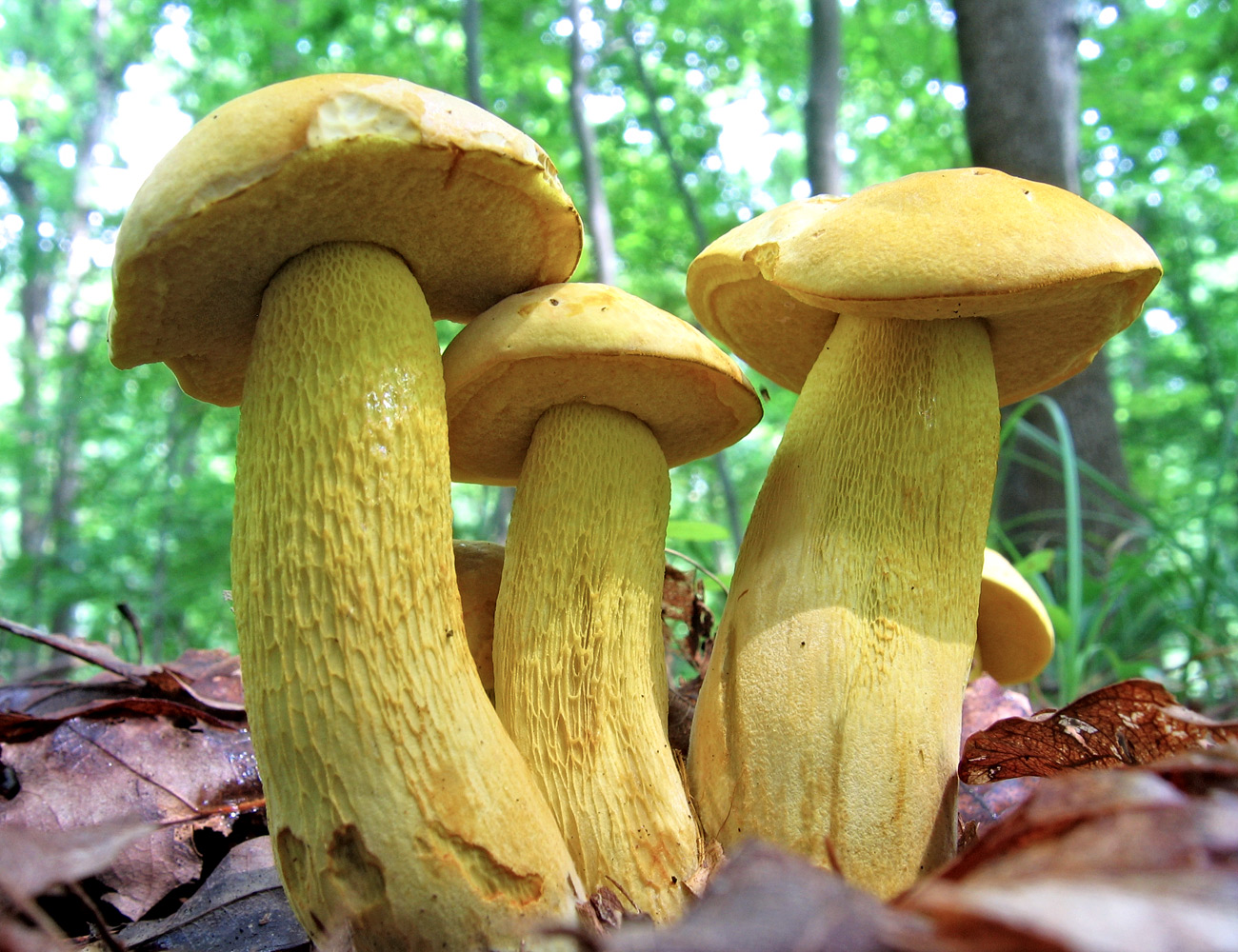
- Retiboletus ornatipes

Scientific classification
- Kingdom: Fungi
- Division: Basidiomycota
- Class: Agaricomycetes
- Order: Boletales
- Family: Boletaceae
- Genus: Retiboletus; Manfr. Binder & Bresinsky

Type species
- Retiboletus ornatipes (Peck) Manfr. Binder & Bresinsky

Species
- R. flavoniger R. griseus R. nigerrimus R. ornatipes R. retipes R. vinaceipes

= Retiboletus =

Genus of fungi

Retiboletus is a genus of fungi in the family Boletaceae. The genus, first described in 2002, contained six species distributed in north temperate regions.

== Species ==
As of October 2023, Index Fungorum lists the following species:

Image	Name	Taxon author	Year
	Retiboletus ater	Yan C. Li & T. Bau	2020
	Retiboletus brevibasidiatus	Raspé & Chuankid	2021
	Retiboletus brunneolus	Yan C. Li & Zhu L. Yang	2021
	Retiboletus flavoniger	(Halling, G.M. Muell. & L.D. Gómez) Manfr. Binder & Halling	2002
	Retiboletus fuscus	(Hongo) N.K. Zeng & Zhu L. Yang	2016
	Retiboletus griseus	(Frost) Manfr. Binder & Bresinsky	2002
	Retiboletus kauffmanii	(Lohwag) N.K. Zeng & Zhu L. Yang	2016
	Retiboletus nigerrimus	(R. Heim) Manfr. Binder & Bresinsky	2002
	Retiboletus nigrogriseus	N.K. Zeng, S. Jiang & Zhi Q. Liang	2018
	Retiboletus ornatipes	(Peck) Manfr. Binder & Bresinsky	2002
	Retiboletus pseudogriseus	N.K. Zeng & Zhu L. Yang	2016
	Retiboletus retipes	(Berk. & M.A. Curtis) Manfr. Binder & Bresinsky	2002
	Retiboletus sinensis	N.K. Zeng & Zhu L. Yang	2016
	Retiboletus sinogriseus	Yan C. Li & T. Bau	2020
	Retiboletus vinaceipes	B. Ortiz, Lodge & T.J. Baroni	2007
	Retiboletus zhangfeii	N.K. Zeng & Zhu L. Yang	2016
