= Aureoboletus longicollis =

Scientific classification
- Domain: Eukaryota
- Kingdom: Fungi
- Division: Basidiomycota
- Class: Agaricomycetes
- Order: Boletales
- Family: Boletaceae
- Genus: Aureoboletus
- Species: A. longicollis

Binomial name
- Aureoboletus longicollis (Ces.) Zeng, Zhang & Liang (2015)

Synonyms
- Boletus longicollis Ces. (1879); Boletellus longicollis (Ces.) Pegler & T.W.K.Young (1981)

Species of fungus

Aureoboletus longicollis is a species of fungus in the family Boletaceae. First described under the name Boletus longicollis in 1879, it was transferred to the genus Boletellus in 1981 before being transferred to Aureoboletus in 2015.
