= Tricholoma zangii =

Scientific classification
- Domain: Eukaryota
- Kingdom: Fungi
- Division: Basidiomycota
- Class: Agaricomycetes
- Order: Agaricales
- Family: Tricholomataceae
- Genus: Tricholoma
- Species: T. zangii

Binomial name
- Tricholoma zangii Z.M.Cao, Y.J.Yao & Pegler (2003)

Species of fungus

Tricholoma zangii is a mushroom of the agaric genus Tricholoma (section Caligata). The species was originally described by mycologist Mu Zang in 1990, who called it Tricholoma quercicola. It was later discovered that this name was a later homonym of a North American species described by William Alphonso Murrill in 1949, and a new name was needed.

Tricholoma zangii grows on the ground near oaks, at altitudes ranging from 3,000–3,900 m (9,800–12,800 ft). Its recorded collection locations in Sichuan, China, include Miyi, Yajiang, and Xiangcheng. The popular pine mushroom (Tricholoma matsutake) is closely related and similar in appearance. It grows, however, at lower elevations than T. zangii—typically 1,500–2,800 m (4,900–9,200 ft)—under pine, spruce, and hemlock. T. zangii also has a paler brown cap, and less intense odor.

== See also ==
- List of Tricholoma species
