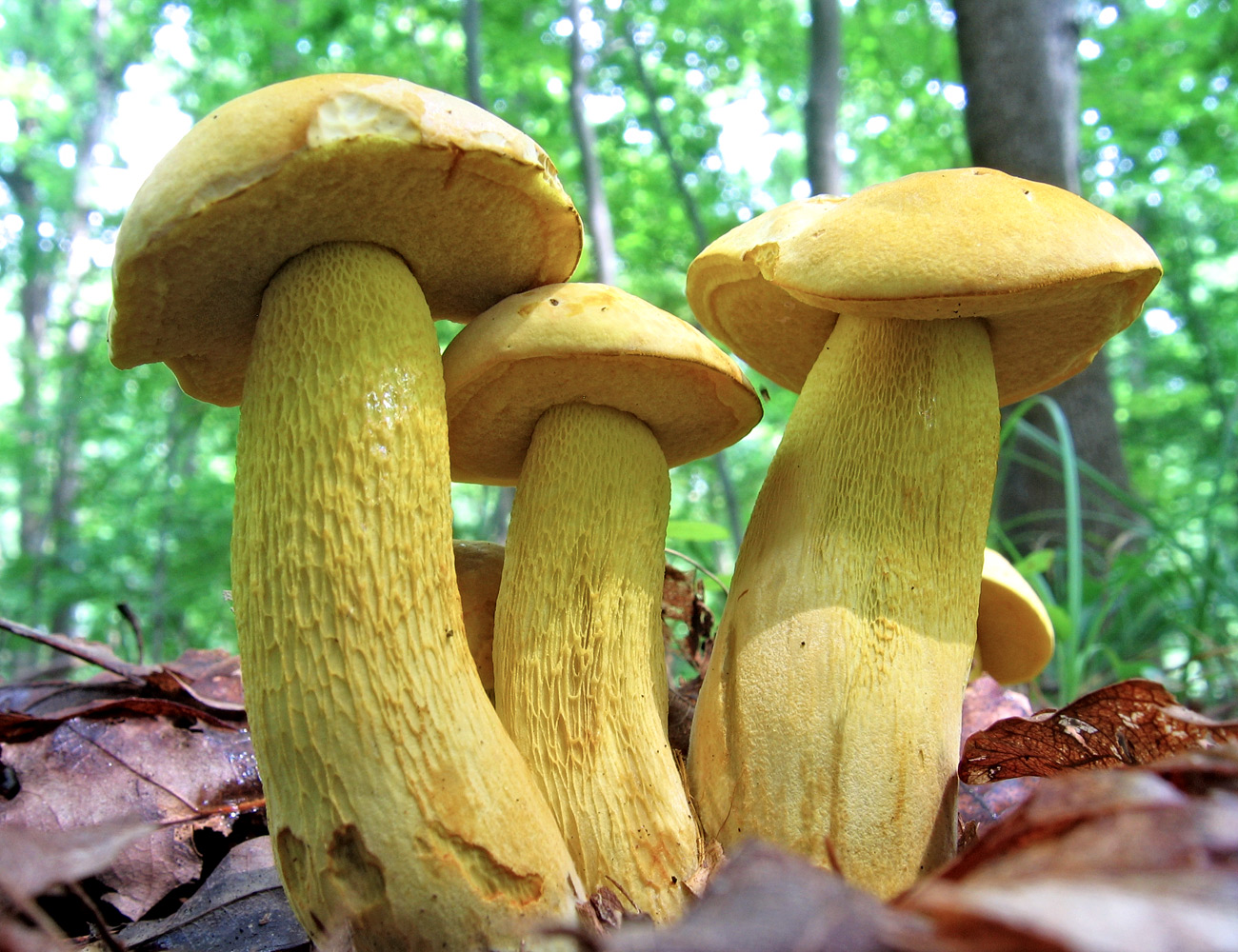

Scientific classification
- Domain: Eukaryota
- Kingdom: Fungi
- Division: Basidiomycota
- Class: Agaricomycetes
- Order: Boletales
- Family: Boletaceae
- Genus: Retiboletus
- Species: R. ornatipes

Binomial name
- Retiboletus ornatipes (Peck) Manfr.Binder & Bresinsky (2002)

Synonyms
- Boletus ornatipes Peck (1878)

= Retiboletus ornatipes =

Species of fungus

Retiboletus ornatipes, commonly known as the ornate-stalked bolete or goldstalk, is a species of bolete fungus in the family Boletaceae. Originally named Boletus ornatipes by American mycologist Charles Horton Peck in 1878, it was transferred to Retiboletus in 2002.

The convex cap is 4–20 centimetres (1 1/2–8 in) wide and yellow, gray, or brown, staining orangish. The stem is 6–12 cm (2 1/4–4 3/4 in) tall and 1–2.5 cm (1/2–1 in) thick. The flesh is yellow with a mild to bitter taste. The spore print is tannish brown.

It can be found under oak and beech in eastern North America from July to September.

One guide lists the species as inedible, while another says it is choice. They reportedly tend to be edible if not bitter.
