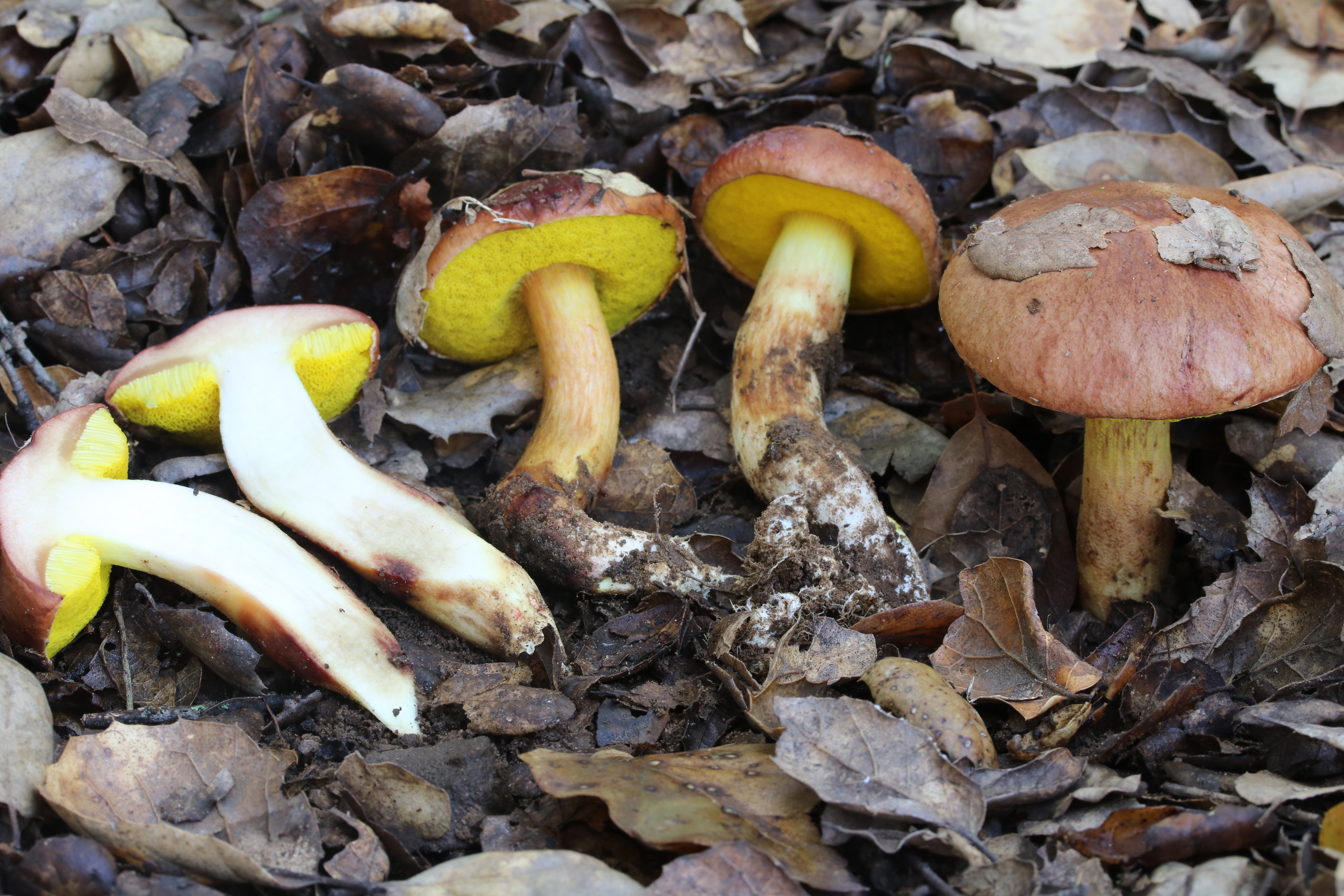
- Aureoboletus flaviporus

Scientific classification
- Kingdom: Fungi
- Division: Basidiomycota
- Class: Agaricomycetes
- Order: Boletales
- Family: Boletaceae
- Genus: Aureoboletus; Pouzar (1957)

Type species
- Aureoboletus gentilis (Quél.) Pouzar (1957)

= Aureoboletus =

Genus of fungi

Aureoboletus is a genus of bolete fungi in the family Boletaceae. It was circumscribed by Czech mycologist Zdeněk Pouzar in 1957. A taxonomic monograph was published in 2010 by Wolfgang Klofac. At least 11 species in these genus are edible and have been traditionally consumed in different regions of the world

== Species ==
Species from Index Fungorum as of 2025:

Image	Scientific name	Taxon author	Distribution
	Aureoboletus abruptibulbus	(Roody, Both & B. Ortiz) G. Wu & Zhu L. Yang 2016	Florida
	Aureoboletus albipes	N.K. Zeng, Xu Zhang & Zhi Q. Liang 2023	China
	Aureoboletus auriflammeus	(Berk. & M.A. Curtis) G. Wu & Zhu L. Yang 2016	Eastern United States
	Aureoboletus auriporus	(Peck) Pouzar 1957	Costa Rica
	Aureoboletus ayuukii	Ayala-Vásquez, García-Jim. & J.I. Fuente 2023	Mexico
	Aureoboletus betula	(Schwein.) M. Kuo & B. Ortiz 2020	southern Appalachians
	Aureoboletus catenarius	G. Wu & Zhu L. Yang 2016	China
	Aureoboletus citriniporus	(Halling) Klofac 2010	USA
	Aureoboletus clavatus	N.K. Zeng & Ming Zhang 2015	China
	Aureoboletus conicus	N.K. Zeng, Xu Zhang & Zhi Q. Liang 2023	China
	Aureoboletus duplicatoporus	(M. Zang) G. Wu & Zhu L. Yang 2016	China
	Aureoboletus flavimarginatus	(Murrill) Klofac 2010	
	Aureoboletus flaviporus	(Earle) Klofac 2010	USA
	Aureoboletus formosus	Ming Zhang & T.H. Li 2015	China
	Aureoboletus gentilis (Kersrode boleet)	(Quél.) Pouzar 1957	Europe
	Aureoboletus glutinosus	Ming Zhang & T.H. Li 2019	China
	Aureoboletus griseorufescens	Ming Zhang & T.H. Li 2019	China
	Aureoboletus guangdongensis	N.K. Zeng, Xu Zhang & Zhi Q. Liang 2022	China
	Aureoboletus innixus	(Frost) Halling, A.R. Bessette & Bessette 2015	North America
	Aureoboletus liquidus	Har. Takah. & Taneyama 2016	Japan
	Aureoboletus longicollis	(Ces.) N.K. Zeng & Ming Zhang 2015	Asia
	Aureoboletus marroninus	T.H. Li & Ming Zhang 2015	China
	Aureoboletus microcarpus	N.K. Zeng, Xu Zhang & S. Jiang 2022	China
	Aureoboletus miniatoaurantiacus	(C.S. Bi & Loh) Ming Zhang, N.K. Zeng & T.H. Li 2019	China
	Aureoboletus minimus	Ming Zhang, C.Q. Wang & T.H. Li 2024	
	Aureoboletus mirabilis	(Murrill) Halling 2015	North America and Asia
	Aureoboletus moravicus	(Vaček) Klofac 2010	Europe
	Aureoboletus nephrosporus	G. Wu & Zhu L. Yang 2016	China
	Aureoboletus nanlingensis	Ming Zhang, C.Q. Wang & T.H. Li 2024	China
	Aureoboletus ornatipes	N.K. Zeng, Xu Zhang & Zhi Q. Liang 2023	China
	Aureoboletus projectellus	(Murrill) Halling 2015	North America and Europe
	Aureoboletus quercus-spinosae	Ming Zhang & T.H. Li 2017	China
	Aureoboletus raphanaceus	Ming Zhang & T.H. Li 2019	China
	Aureoboletus readii	Ayala-Vásquez, Pérez-Moreno, Martínez-Reyes & Carbajal-Ramírez 2023	Mexico
	Aureoboletus roxanae	(Frost) Klofac 2010	North America
	Aureoboletus rubellus	J.Y. Fang, G. Wu & K. Zhao 2019	China
	Aureoboletus rugosus	N.K. Zeng, Xu Zhang, L.P. Tang & W.H. Zhang 2022	China
	Aureoboletus russellii	(Frost) G. Wu & Zhu L. Yang 2016	North America
	Aureoboletus shichianus	(Teng & L. Ling) G. Wu & Zhu L. Yang 2016	China
	Aureoboletus singeri	(Gonz.-Velázq. & R. Valenz.) Har. Takah. & Taneyama 2016	China
	Aureoboletus sinobadius	Ming Zhang & T.H. Li 2018	China
	Aureoboletus solus	Ming Zhang & T.H. Li 2019	China
	Aureoboletus subacidus	(Murrill ex Singer) Pouzar 1957	
	Aureoboletus tenuis	T.H. Li & Ming Zhang 2014	Guangxi Province, China
	Aureoboletus thibetanus	(Pat.) Hongo & Nagas. 1980	Asia
	Aureoboletus tomentosus	G. Wu & Zhu L. Yang 2016	
	Aureoboletus velutipes	Ming Zhang & T.H. Li 2019	China
	Aureoboletus venustus	Fang Li, Kuan Zhao & Qing Li Deng 2016	China
	Aureoboletus viridiflavus	Coker & Beers ex Klofac 2010	USA
	Aureoboletus viscidipes	(Hongo) G. Wu & Zhu L. Yang 2016	China
	Aureoboletus viscosus	(C.S. Bi & Loh) G. Wu & Zhu L. Yang 2016	China
	Aureoboletus wusangongii	N.K. Zeng, H.Z. Qin, W.F. Lin & L.G. Hu 2024	China
	Aureoboletus yunnanensis	G. Wu & Zhu L. Yang 2016	Yunnan China
	Aureoboletus zangii	X.F. Shi & P.G. Liu 2013	China
