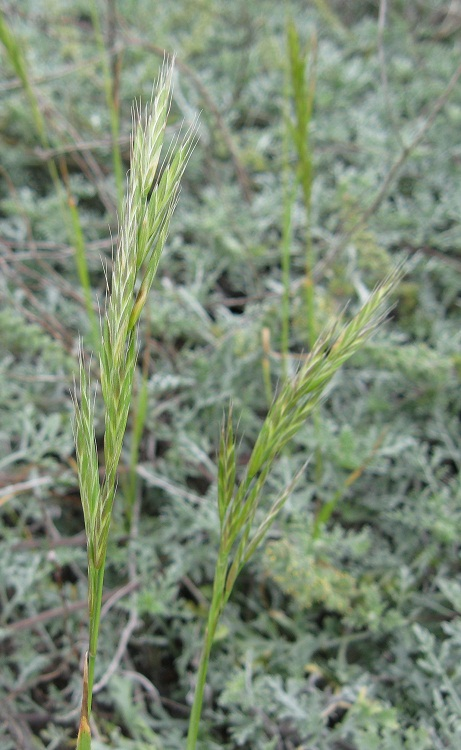

Conservation status
- Vulnerable (NatureServe)

Scientific classification
- Kingdom: Plantae
- Clade: Tracheophytes
- Clade: Angiosperms
- Clade: Monocots
- Clade: Commelinids
- Order: Poales
- Family: Poaceae
- Subfamily: Pooideae
- Genus: Bromus
- Species: B. arizonicus

Binomial name
- Bromus arizonicus (Shear) Stebbins

Synonyms
- Bromus carinatus var. arizonicus Shear; Ceratochloa arizonica (Shear) Holub

= Bromus arizonicus =

Species of flowering plant

Bromus arizonicus is a species of annual brome grass known by the common name Arizona brome.

It is native to the Southwestern United States, California, and Baja California, where it grows in many types of grassy valley and desert habitat.

== Description ==
It is an annual grass growing 30 to 70 centimetres (12 to 28 in) tall with an open, branching inflorescence in the form of a panicle. The primary branches of the panicle are appressed. Its spikelets are solitary, and fertile spikelets have pedicels. The spikelets are flat and hairy, with five to eight florets; the spikelets break up at maturity and disarticulate below the fertile florets. The glumes are shorter than the spikelets and thinner than fertile lemmas. Both upper and lower glumes are lanceolate, and both are hairless or only have very fine hairs. The lemmas are 9 to 14 mm (3/8 to 1/2 in) long and have seven prominent veins. The awns are 6 to 13 mm (1/4 to 1/2 in). Its anthers are about 0.4 mm (1/32 in) long, which suggests that most of its seeds are produced by self-fertilization.

== Distribution and habitat ==
Bromus arizonicus is native to the American southwest and northwestern Mexico, occurring in the United States from California and Nevada east to Texas, and in Mexico in Baja California. It prefers dry, open areas and disturbed grounds at elevations lower than 2,000 m (6,600 ft) feet.
