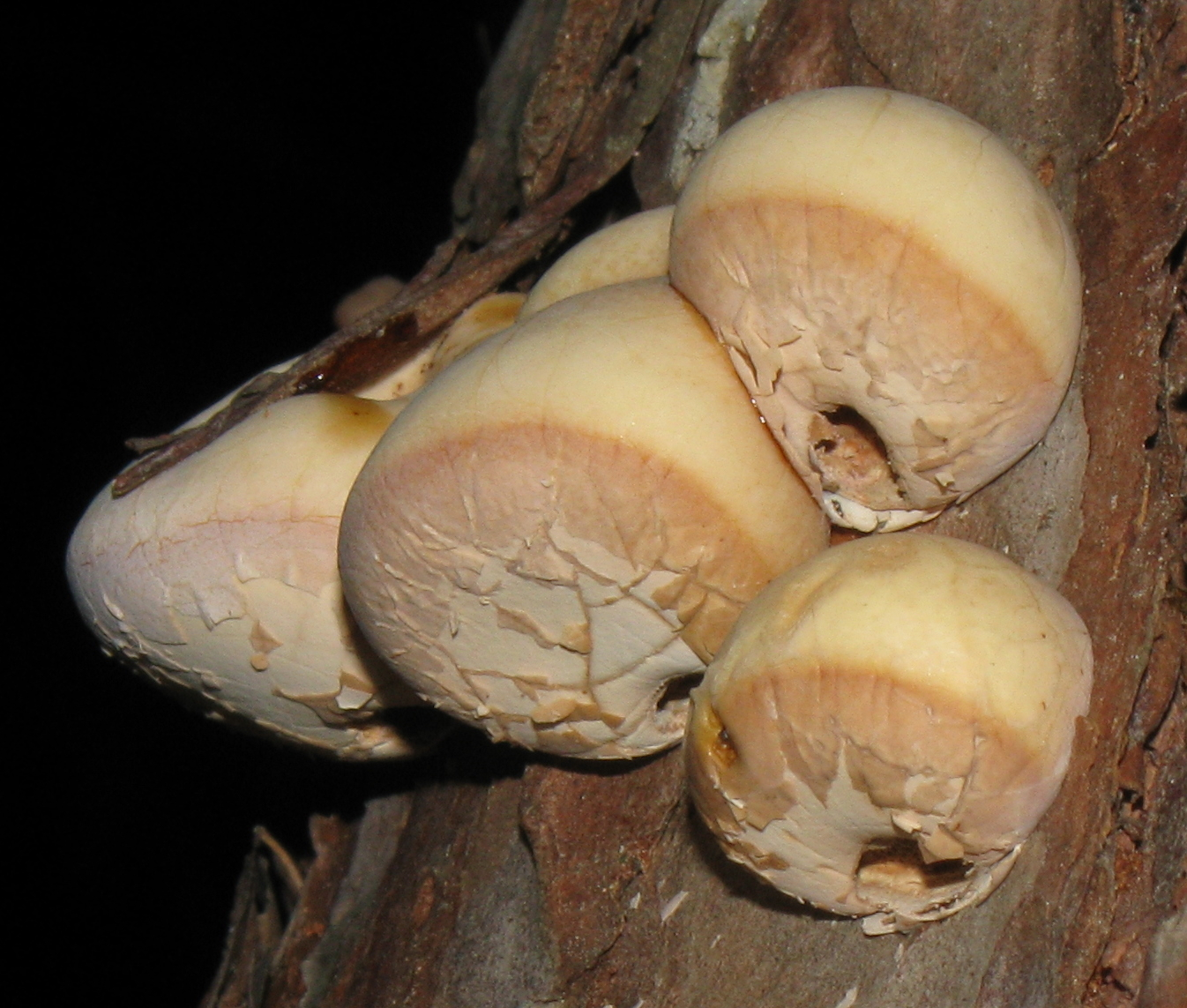

Scientific classification
- Kingdom: Fungi
- Division: Basidiomycota
- Class: Agaricomycetes
- Order: Polyporales
- Family: Polyporaceae
- Genus: Cryptoporus
- Species: C. volvatus

Binomial name
- Cryptoporus volvatus (Peck) Shear (1902)

Synonyms
- Cryptoporus volvatus var. pleurostoma (Pat.) Sacc.; Cryptoporus volvatus var. torreyi (W.R.Gerard) Shear; Cryptoporus volvatus (Peck) Shear; Fomes volvatus (Peck) Cooke; Fomes volvatus var. pleurostoma (Pat.) Sacc. & Traverso; Fomes volvatus var. torreyi (W.R.Gerard) Sacc.; Polyporus volvatus Peck; Polyporus volvatus W.R.Gerard; Scindalma volvatum (Peck) Kuntze; Ungulina volvata (Peck) Pat.; Ungulina volvata var. pleurostoma Pat.

= Cryptoporus volvatus =

Species of fungus

Cryptoporus volvatus
- Mycological characteristics
- Pores on hymenium
- No distinct cap
- Hymenium attachment is irregular or not applicable
- Lacks a stipe
- Spore print is pink
- Ecology is saprotrophic or parasitic
- Edibility is too hard to eat

Cryptoporus volvatus, commonly known as the veiled polypore or cryptic globe fungus, is a polypore fungus that decomposes the rotting sapwood of conifers. It is an after effect of attack by the pine bark beetle.

The fungus was originally described by American mycologist Charles Horton Peck in 1875 as Polyporus volvatus. Cornelius Lott Shear transferred it to the genus Cryptoporus in 1902.

The fruiting body is 1.5–8.5 centimetres (1/2–3 1/4 in) across and cream or tan in color. It is hollow inside and a hole is either torn by insects or a tear appears on the underside. There are 3–4 whitish pores per millimetre, hidden by the veil-like margin. The spores are pinkish.

Some insects lay their larvae inside the fruiting body. Due to its toughness, it is inedible.
