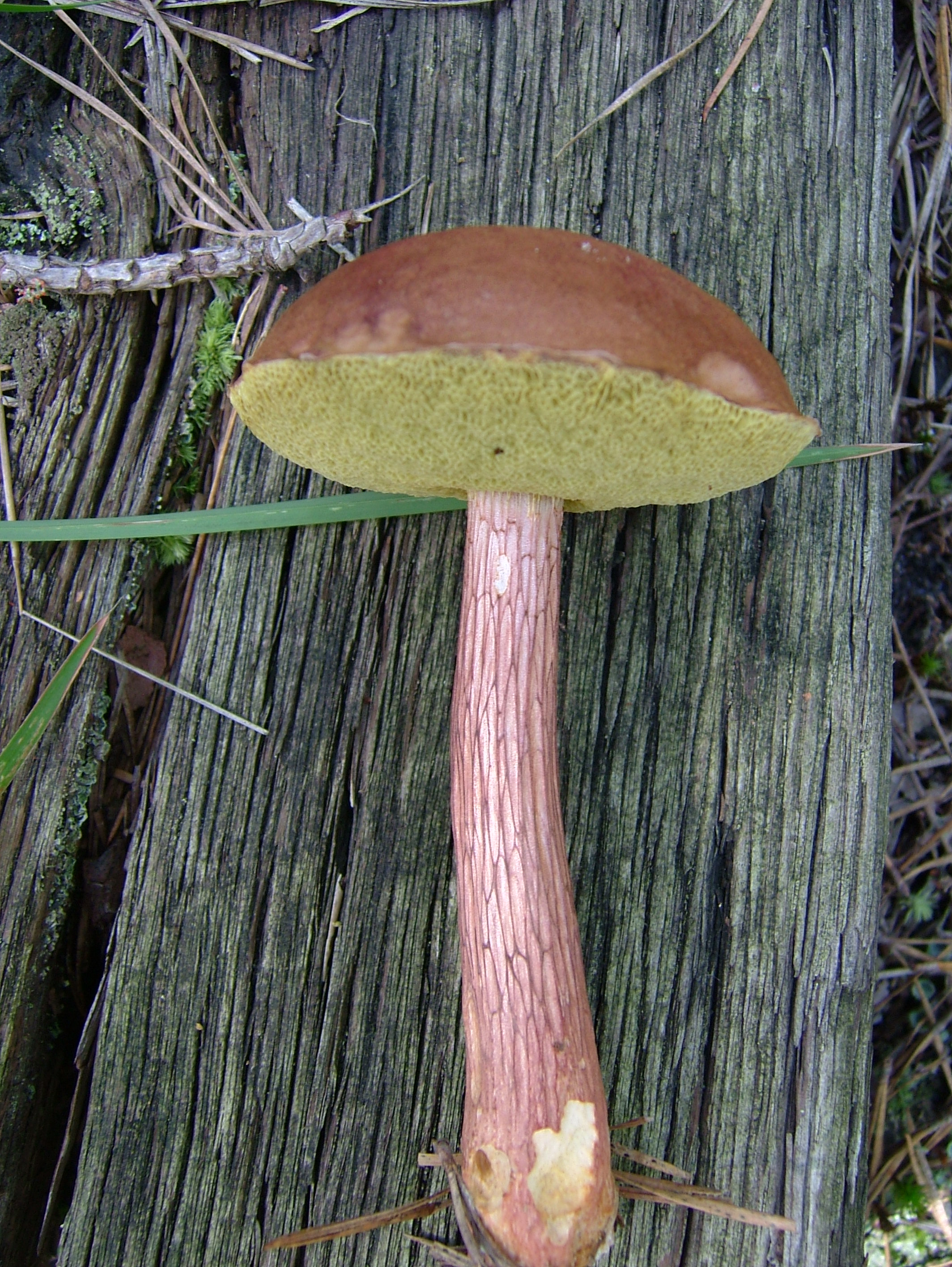

Scientific classification
- Kingdom: Fungi
- Division: Basidiomycota
- Class: Agaricomycetes
- Order: Boletales
- Family: Boletaceae
- Genus: Aureoboletus
- Species: A. projectellus

Binomial name
- Aureoboletus projectellus (Murrill) Halling (2015)

Synonyms
- Ceriomyces projectellus Murrill (1938); Boletus projectellus (Murrill) Murrill 1938; Boletellus projectellus (Murrill) Singer (1945)

= Aureoboletus projectellus =

Species of fungus

Aureoboletus projectellus is a species of bolete fungus in the family Boletaceae. Found in North America, and recently in Europe, it grows in a mycorrhizal association with pine trees.

== Taxonomy ==
The species was first described by American mycologist William Alphonso Murrill in 1938 as Ceriomyces projectellus, from collections made in Lynchburg, Virginia who later transferred it to Boletus. Rolf Singer transferred the species to the genus Boletellus in 1945. In 2015 Roy Halling transferred to the genus Aureoboletus based on DNA evidence.

== Description ==
The cap is initially convex before flattening out in maturity, and attains a diameter of 4–20 cm (1.6–7.9 in). The cap surface is dry, initially with a velvety so slightly hairy texture but developing small cracks in age. The color in young specimens is pale to dark cinnamon-brown to dull reddish or dark reddish-brown, sometimes tinged with gray or olive-green, particularly in younger individuals. The flesh is whitish (sometimes with rosy tints), has no distinctive odor, and an acidic taste. Unlike many bolete species, it does not turn blue when cut or injured, but it does slowly turn yellow-brown. The pore surface on the underside of the cap is initially yellow before turning brownish-olive in maturity, and the circular pores are about 0.5–2 mm wide. The tubes comprising the hymenophore are 1–2.5 cm (0.4–1.0 in) deep. The stem is 9–24 cm (3.5–9.4 in) long by 1–5 cm (0.4–2.0 in) thick, and either equal in width through, or larger at the base. It is solid (i.e., not hollow), dry, and more or less the same color as the cap, or lighter. Its surface has a prominent reticulum (network-like surface), especially on the upper two-thirds; near the base, there is a white tomentum. The base of the stem turns sticky in wet weather.

Aureoboletus projectellus produces an olive-brown spore print. The spores are oval to spindle-shaped, smooth, and measure 18–33 by 7.5–12 μm; these are the largest spores of any bolete species in North America. Fruit bodies are edible. They can be used in mushroom dyeing to produce a variety of colors (yellow, brownish orange, dark orange, greenish brown or greenish yellow), depending on the mordant used.

== Habitat and distribution ==
The fruit bodies of Aureoboletus projectellus grow singly, scattered, or in groups on the ground in a mycorrhizal association with pine trees. In North America, its range includes eastern Canada (New Brunswick) south to North Carolina and west to Michigan. It has also been recorded in Mexico. In 2011, it was reported for the first time in Europe, from Lithuania (Curonian Spit); the identification of the species was confirmed by comparing DNA sequences with authentic North American collections. In 2013, it was also reported from Latvia, where it has been declared "fungus of the year 2014". They were also reported to appear in Poland since 2016, in Norway and Denmark since 2014, and in Sweden since 2017. Also widely distributed in Estonia. First reported in Finland in 2023.

== Uses ==
Edible. Can be fried without pre-boiling.

== See also ==
- List of North American boletes
