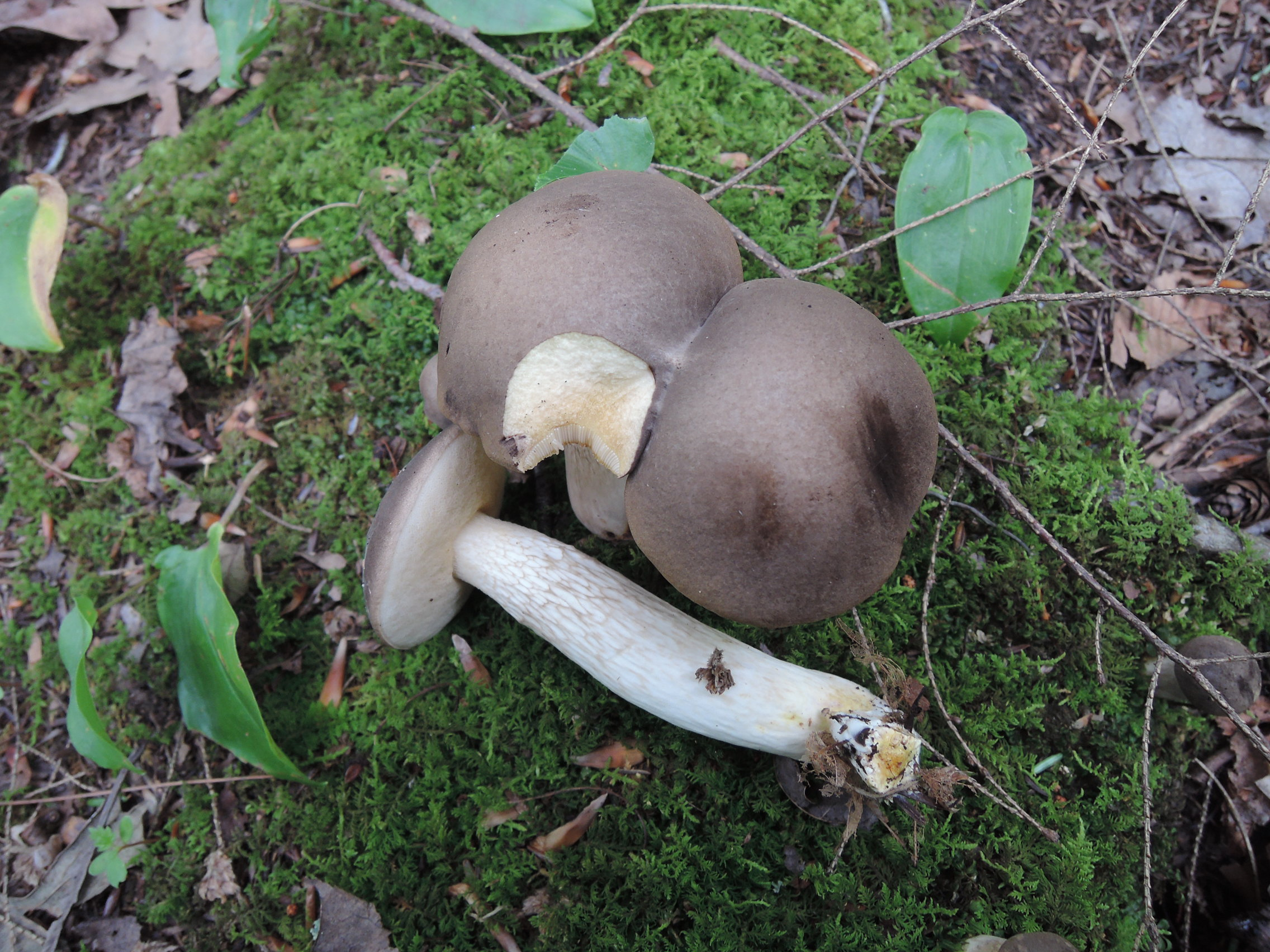

Scientific classification
- Domain: Eukaryota
- Kingdom: Fungi
- Division: Basidiomycota
- Class: Agaricomycetes
- Order: Boletales
- Family: Boletaceae
- Genus: Retiboletus
- Species: R. vinaceipes

Binomial name
- Retiboletus vinaceipes B.Ortiz (2007)

= Retiboletus vinaceipes =

Species of fungus

Retiboletus vinaceipes is a species of bolete fungus in the family Boletaceae. Found in the Dominican Republic, it was described as new to science in 2007.
