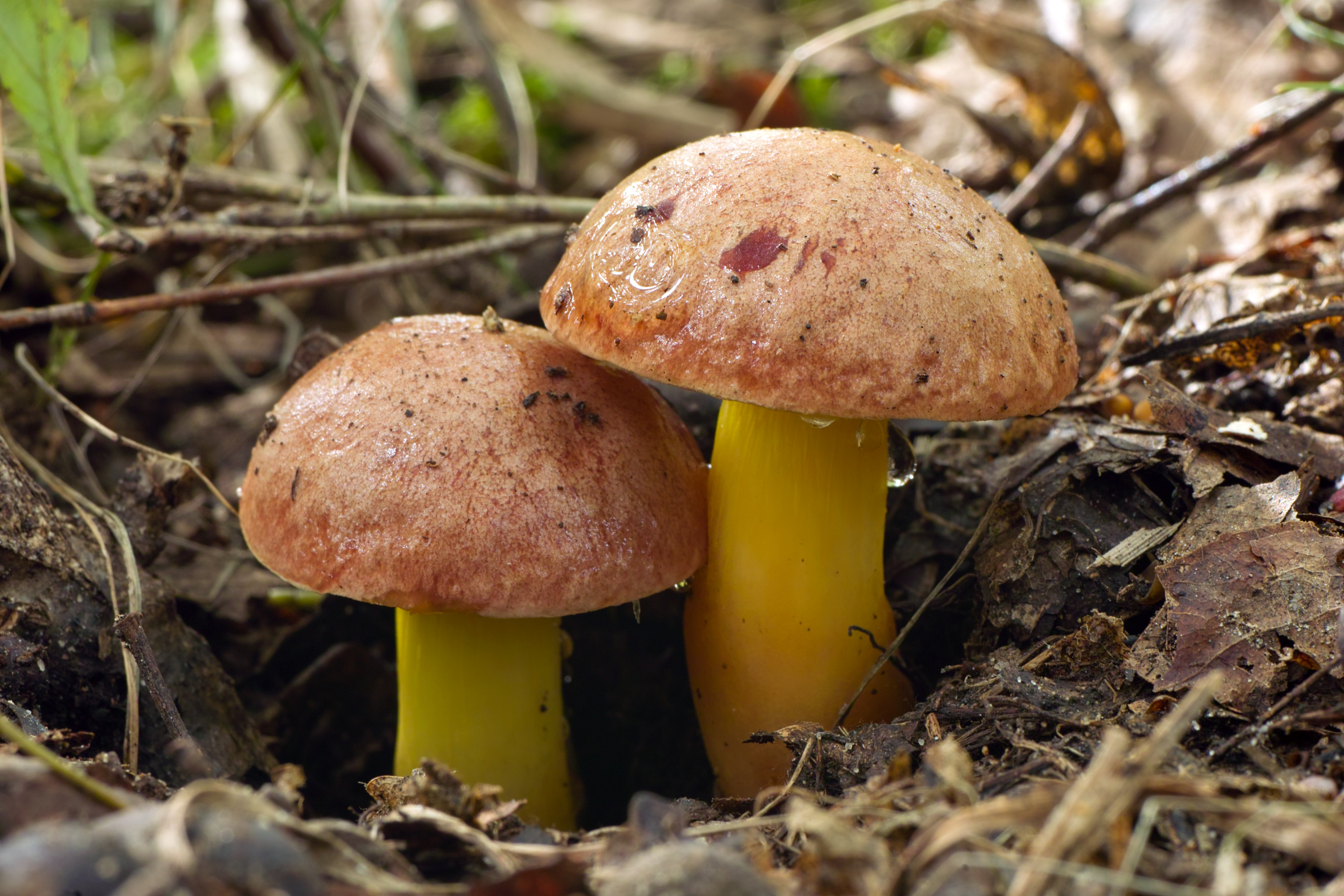

Scientific classification
- Kingdom: Fungi
- Division: Basidiomycota
- Class: Agaricomycetes
- Order: Boletales
- Family: Boletaceae
- Genus: Aureoboletus
- Species: A. gentilis

Binomial name
- Aureoboletus gentilis (Quél.) Pouzar (1957)

Synonyms
- Boletus cramesinus Secr. (1833); Boletus granulatus var. tenuipes Cooke (1883); Boletus sanguineus subsp. gentilis (Quél.) Quél. (1883); Boletus sanguineus var. gentilis Quél. (1884); Viscipellis gentilis (Quél.) Quél. (1886); Boletus gentilis (Quél.) Sacc. (1888); Ixocomus gentilis (Quél.) Quél. (1888); Boletus tenuipes (Cooke) Massee (1892); Xerocomus gentilis (Quél.) Singer (1942); Pulveroboletus gentilis (Quél.) Singer (1945); Pulveroboletus cramesinus (Secr. ex Watling) M.M.Moser ex Singer (1966)

= Aureoboletus gentilis =

Species of fungus

Aureoboletus gentilis is a species of bolete fungus in the family Boletaceae. Originally described as Boletus sanguineus var. gentilis by French mycologist Lucien Quélet in 1884, it was transferred to the genus Aureoboletus by Zdeněk Pouzar in 1957. It is considered vulnerable in the Czech Republic.
