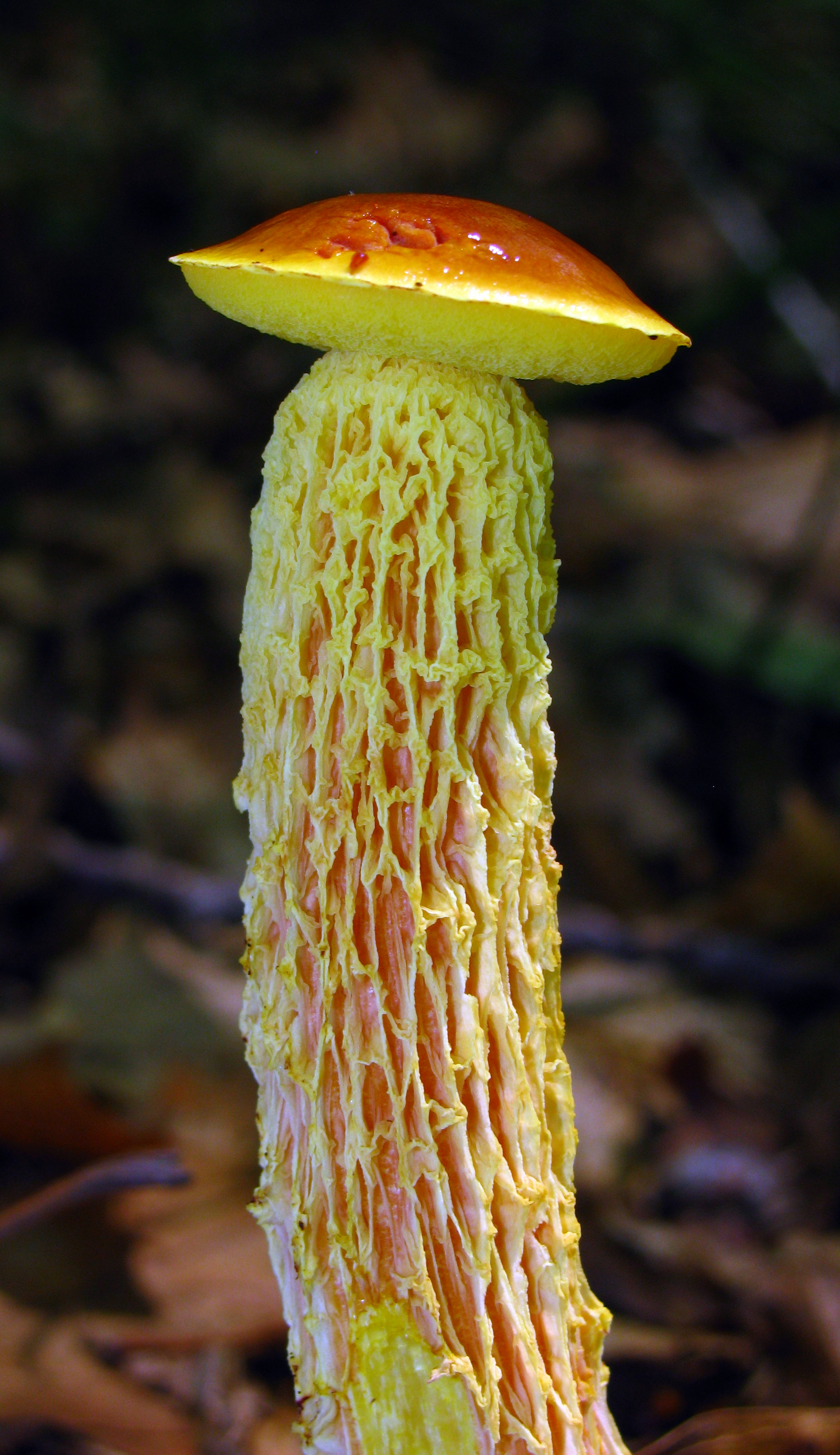

Scientific classification
- Kingdom: Fungi
- Division: Basidiomycota
- Class: Agaricomycetes
- Order: Boletales
- Family: Boletaceae
- Genus: Aureoboletus
- Species: A. betula

Binomial name
- Aureoboletus betula (Schwein.) M. Kuo & B. Ortiz (2020)

Synonyms
- Boletus betula Schwein. (1822); Ceriomyces betula Murrill (1909); Boletellus betula E.-J.Gilbert (1931); Frostiella betula Murrill (1942); Austroboletus betula E. Horak (1980); Heimiella betula Watling (1990); Heimioporus betula E. Horak (2004)

= Aureoboletus betula =

Species of fungus

Aureoboletus betula
- Mycological characteristics
- Pores on hymenium
- Cap is convex
- Hymenium is adnate
- Stipe is bare
- Spore print is olive
- Ecology is mycorrhizal
- Edibility is edible

Aureoboletus betula is a species of mushroom producing fungus in the family Boletaceae. It is commonly known as the shaggy-stalked bolete.

== Taxonomy ==
It was first described in 1822 by the German-American mycologist Lewis David de Schweinitz and classified as Boletus betula. It has been reclassified many times over the years. In 2004, the Austrian mycologist Egon Horak's classified it as Heimioporus betula. In 2020, it was reclassified as Aureoboletus betula by the mycologists Michael Kuo and Beatriz Ortiz-Santana.

=== Etymology ===
The specific epithet 'betula', meaning birch, does not an imply a preference for growing under birch trees but to their shaggy bark, which the stipe of this species is reminiscent of.

== Description ==
The cap is 2–5 centimetres (3/4–2 in) wide, convex and broadening with age. It starts golden yellow, discolouring to brownish yellow or reddish orange. The texture is sticky and the flesh is yellow. There are 1–2 pores every millimetre with tubes that are 1.5 cm deep. They are bright yellow, turning greenish yellow with age.

The stem is 8–15 cm (3 1/4–6 in) tall and 1–2 cm thick. It is distinctly textured with deep ridges and a slightly swollen and rooting base. The stem flesh is white, staining pink when exposed to air. The taste and smell are indistinct.

The spores are ellipsoid, measuring 16–24 x 7–12 μm. The spore print is olive.

=== Similar species ===
Outside of its genus, it resembles Butyriboletus frostii, which is relatively more red and squat.

== Distribution and habitat ==
It is found under oaks, or in mixed woods of pine and oak, primarily in the southern Appalachians, from July to September.

== Edibility ==
This species is edible.
