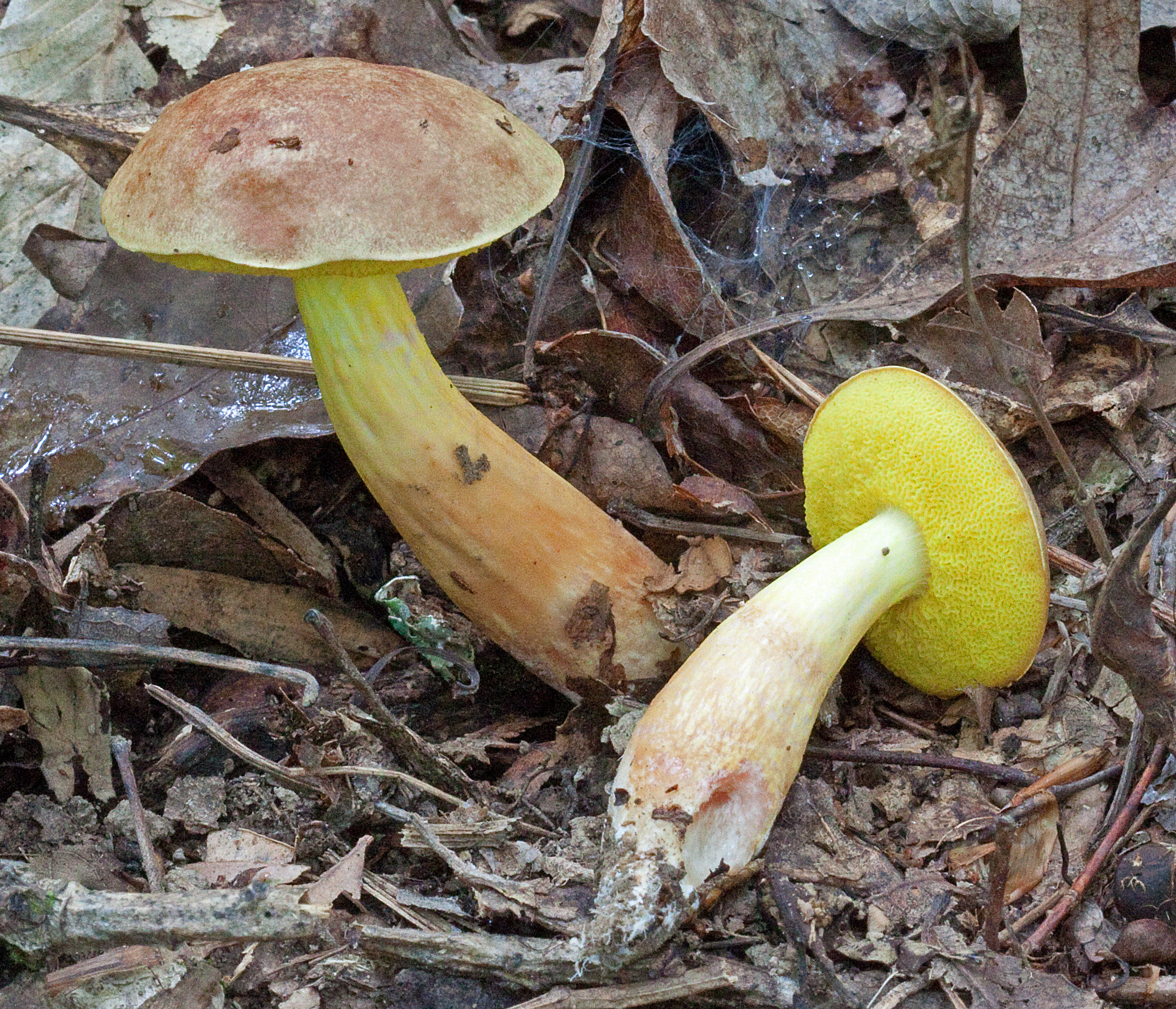

Scientific classification
- Kingdom: Fungi
- Division: Basidiomycota
- Class: Agaricomycetes
- Order: Boletales
- Family: Boletaceae
- Genus: Aureoboletus
- Species: A. auriporus

Binomial name
- Aureoboletus auriporus (Peck) Pouzar (1957)

Synonyms
- Boletus auriporus Peck (1872); Ceriomyces auriporus (Peck) Murrill (1909); Xerocomus auriporus (Peck) Singer (1940); Pulveroboletus auriporus (Peck) Singer (1947); Aureoboletus novoguineensis Hongo (1973); Aureoboletus auriporus var. novoguineensis (Hongo) Klofac (2010)

= Aureoboletus auriporus =

Species of fungus

Aureoboletus auriporus is a species of bolete fungus in the family Boletaceae that is found in Europe and North America. It was originally described in 1872 by American mycologist Charles Horton Peck, who called it Boletus auriporus. Zdenek Pouzar transferred it to the genus Aureoboletus in 1957.

The species is edible, and could be confused with (the also edible) Xerocomus illudens.

== See also ==
- List of North American boletes
