= Charles Christopher Frost =

American mycologist (1805–1880)

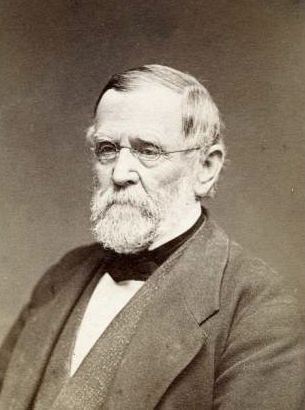
- Born: November 1, 1805; Brattleboro, Vermont
- Died: March 16, 1880 (aged 74); Brattleboro, Vermont
- Scientific career
- Fields: Mycology

Charles Christopher Frost (November 11, 1805 – March 16, 1880) was an American mycologist. He described several species of fungi from the New England area of the United States. In one paper, Frost described 22 new species of boletes, and he was later credited with the discovery of three additional species. His personal herbarium of specimens were given to the University of Vermont in 1902. Portions of his collection today are distributed between the Farlow Herbarium at Harvard University, the New York State Museum, the Bell Museum of Natural History, and the Buffalo Museum of Science.

== Early life ==
Frost was born in Brattleboro, Vermont, on November 11, 1805. His parents were shoemaker James Frost and Elizabeth Stewart, daughter of an officer in the American Revolution. When he was fifteen, Frost left school after being hit with a ruler by a teacher, and assisted his father with his business. Although Frost had developed a prior interest in the natural sciences, his interest in botany grew after meeting with physician Willard Parker, who recommended Frost undertake botanical walks to alleviate the symptoms of his dyspepsia. Frost started studying the mosses and lichens he encountered on these walks. He later investigated fungi, particularly the bolete mushrooms.

== Eponymous taxa ==
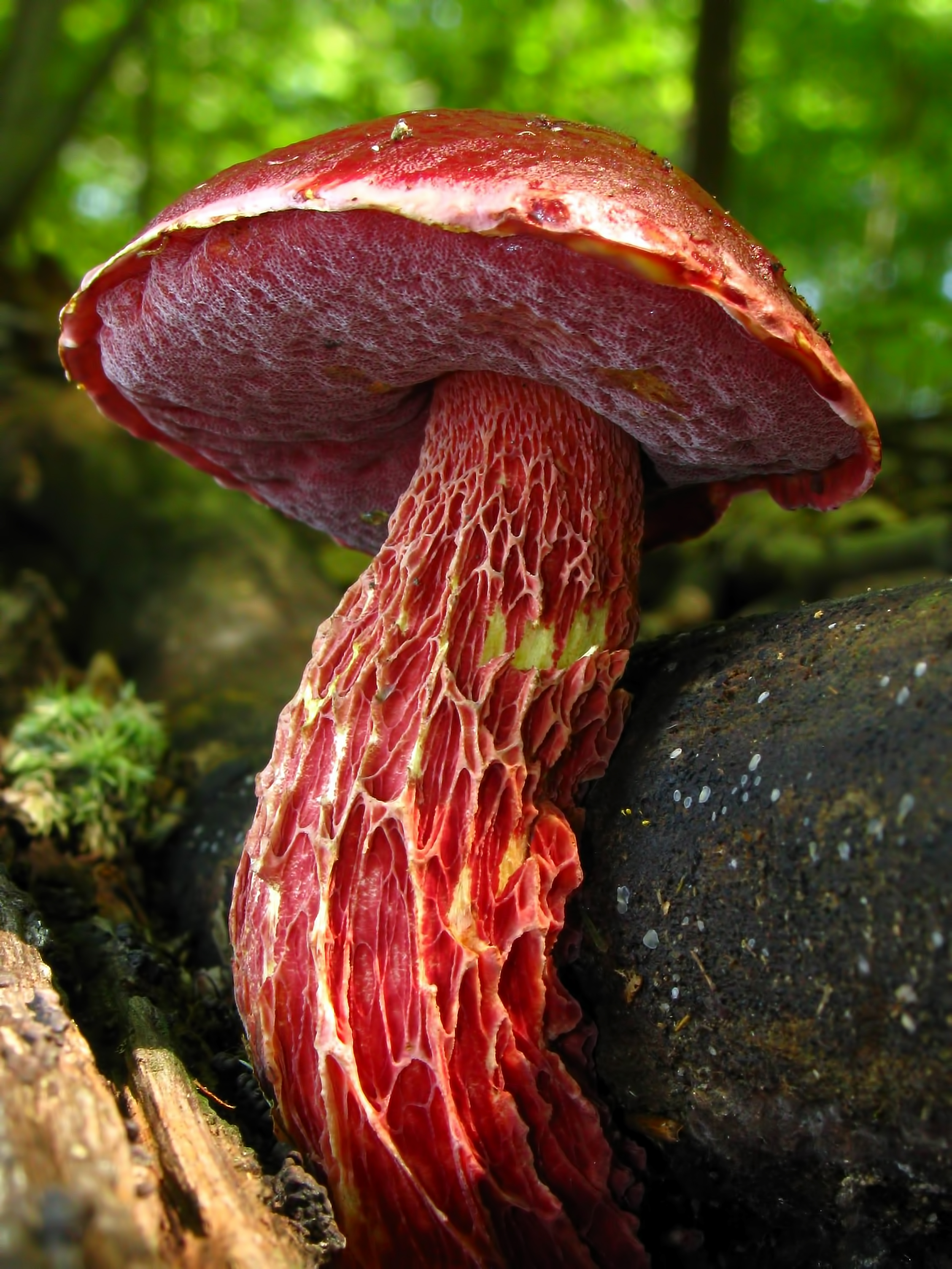
Boletus frostii

- Agaricus frostianus Peck 1883
- Amanita frostiana Peck 1900
- Amanita subfrostiana Zhu L.Yang 1997
- Boletus frostii J.L.Russell
- Boletus pseudofrostii B. Ortiz 2007
- Cetraria fahlunensis var. frostii (Tuck.) Zahlbr. 1929
- Cetraria hepatizon var. frostii (Tuck.) Räsänen 1952
- Diatrype frostii (Peck) Cooke 1886
- Diatrypella frostii Peck 1878
- Dirinaria frostii (Tuck.) Hale & W.L.Culb. 1970
- Frostiella Murrill 1942
- Lecanora frostii (Tuck.) Tuck. 1866
- Lycoperdon frostii Peck 1879
- Parmelia frostii Tuck. 1882
- Phyllosticta afrostyracis C.Moreau 1947
- Physcia frostii (Tuck.) Zahlbr. 1930
- Pyxine frostii (Tuck.) Tuck. 1882
- Squamaria frostii Tuck. 1858
- Suillellus frostii (J.L.Russell) Murrill 1909
- Tubiporus frostii (J.L.Russell) Imai{?} 1968
- Venenarius frostianus (Peck) Murrill 1913

== Species described ==
- Boletus arcuatus Frost
- Boletus chromapes Frost 1874
- Boletus chromopus Frost
- Boletus decorus Frost 1874
- Boletus firmus Frost 1874
- Boletus griseus Frost 1878
- Boletus innixus Frost 1874
- Boletus limatulus Frost 1874
- Boletus macrosporus Frost
- Boletus magnisporus Frost 1874
- Boletus miniato-olivaceus Frost 1874
- Boletus pallidus Frost 1874
- Boletus peckii Frost 1878
- Boletus roxanae Frost 1874
- Boletus rubens Frost
- Boletus russellii Frost 1878
- Boletus salmonicolor Frost 1874
- Boletus serotinus Frost 1877
- Boletus sordidus Frost 1874
- Boletus speciosus Frost 1874
- Boletus submoricolor Frost 1877
- Hygrophorus flavodiscus Frost 1884
- Hygrophorus fuligineus Frost 1884
- Polyporus morganii Frost 1879
- Russula compacta Frost 1879
- Russula flavida Frost 1879
- Urocystis cepulae Frost 1877
- Uromyces cepulae Frost
