= Cornelius Lott Shear =

American mycologist and plant pathologist

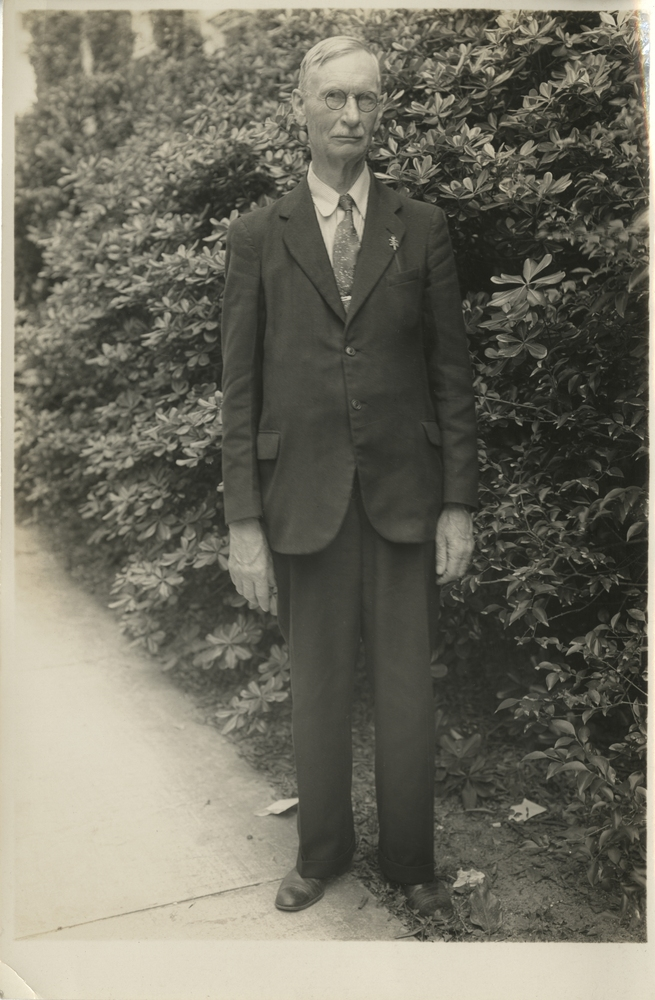
- Born: 26 March 1865; Albany
- Died: 2 February 1956
- Education: University of Nebraska–Lincoln
- Occupations: Botanist; mycologist
- Spouse: Avis Morrison Sherwood (m. 1890-1950; her death)
- Children: 6
- Scientific career
- Fields: Mycology, botany, plant pathology
- Workplaces: United States Department of Agriculture
- Author abbrev. (botany): Shear

Cornelius Lott Shear (March 26, 1865 February 2, 1956) was an American mycologist and plant pathologist who served as a senior pathologist at the USDA Bureau of Plant Industry.

Born in Coeyman's Hollow, Albany County, New York, on March 26, 1865, Shear was the first to describe the grass Bromus arizonicus. He was a pioneer in the study of pathogenic fungi who studied crop diseases and developed control measures for treatment of economically-important crops such as cranberries, grapes and cotton. Shear edited the exsiccata series New York fungi. He played a pivotal role in creating the American Phytopathological Society, founded in 1908.

The standard author abbreviation Shear is used to indicate this person as the author when citing a botanical name.
