= Mu Zang =

Chinese mycologist (1930–2011)

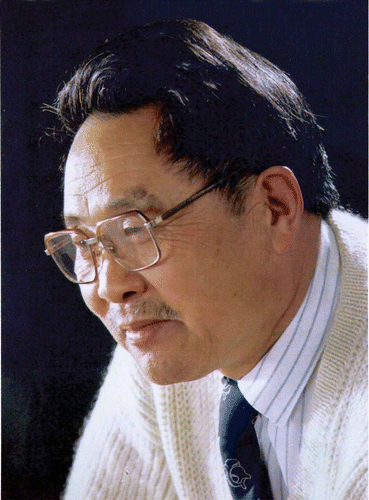
- Born: December 28, 1930; Yantai
- Died: November 10, 2011 (aged 80); Kunming
- Spouse: Xinjiang Li
- Scientific career
- Fields: Mycology
- Institutions: Nanjing Normal University, Kunming Institute of Botany
- Author abbrev. (botany): M.Zang

Mu Zang (28 December 1930 – 10 November 2011) was a Chinese mycologist. He was known for his research on the Boletales of China, and the ecology and biogeography of fungi in southwestern China. He described more than 140 new species and circumscribed three genera, published more than 150 research papers, was chief editor or co-editor for twelve books, and wrote two monographs on the Boletaceae of China. His final book, "Dictionary of the Families and Genera of Chinese Cryptogamic (Spore) Plants" was co-authored with his wife, Professor Xinjiang Li.

== Personal life ==
Mu Zang was born on 10 November 1930, in Yantai, eastern China. After graduating in biology from Soochow University in 1953, he taught biology at Nanjing Normal University from 1954 to 1973, where he eventually became a lecturer. In 1974 Zang began work as associate professor at the Kunming Institute of Botany of the Chinese Academy of Sciences; he later was full research professor at this institute.

Zang was largely responsible for the establishment of the Cryptogamic Herbarium of the Kunming Institute of Botany. This herbarium, one of the largest and most active in the world, contains (as of 2012) more than 210,000 specimens. Zang personally contributed in excess of 13,800 fungal specimens, 24,500 lichen specimens, and 1000 moss specimens.

Personal interests of Zang included painting, calligraphy, and stamp collecting. Zang died of a heart attack in Kunming on 10 November 2011.

== Honours and awards ==
Among the awards won by Mu Zang include:

- Chinese Academy of Sciences Outstanding Achievement Award (1986)
- Chinese National Science Research Awards (1993, 1995, and 2004)
- Science and Technology Application Progress Award of the Chinese Ministry of Forestry (1992)
- Japanese N. Hiratsuka Award (2003)

Zang was associate director of the Key Laboratory of Mycology and Lichenology of the Chinese Academy of Sciences, and the vice president of the Mycological Society of China. Fungal taxa named in his honour include the species Amanita zangii, Cantharellus zangii, Aureoboletus zangii, Meliola zangii, Nectria zangii, Sinoboletus wangii, and Tricholoma zangii, and the bolete genus Zangia.

== See also ==
- List of mycologists
- Category:Taxa named by Mu Zang
