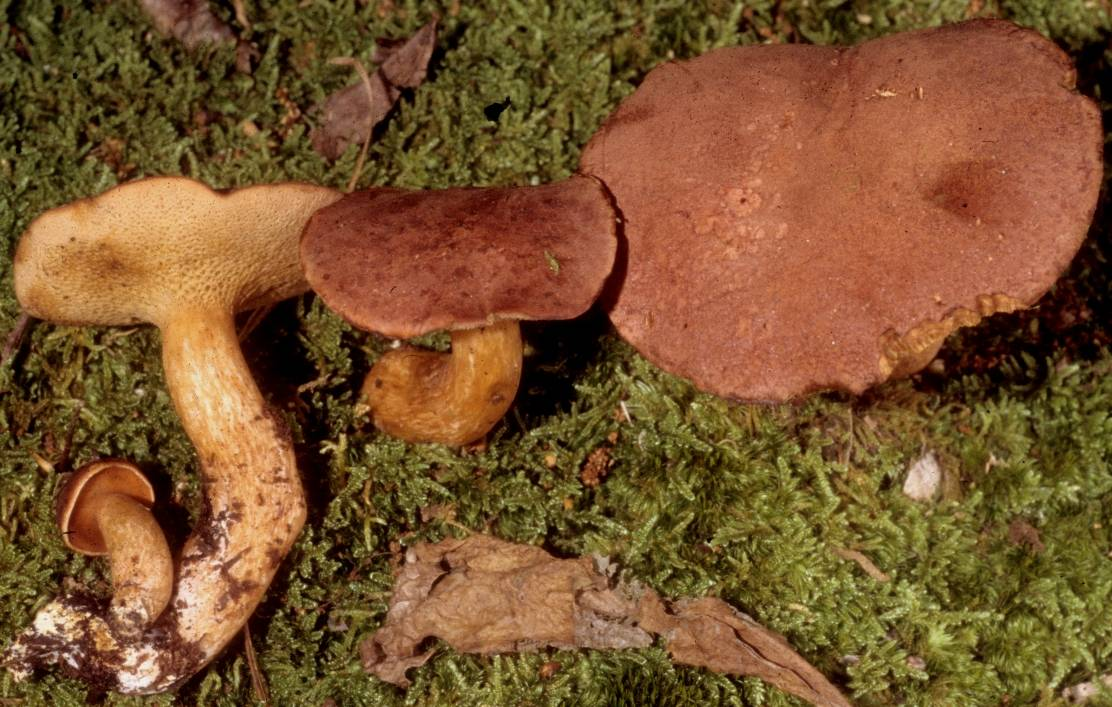

Scientific classification
- Domain: Eukaryota
- Kingdom: Fungi
- Division: Basidiomycota
- Class: Agaricomycetes
- Order: Boletales
- Family: Boletaceae
- Genus: Bothia; Halling, T.J.Baroni & Manfr.Binder (2007)
- Species: B. castanella

Binomial name
- Bothia castanella (Peck) Halling, T.J.Baroni & Manfr.Binder (2007)

Synonyms
- Boletinus castanellus Peck (1900); Boletinellus castanellus (Peck) Murrill (1909); Boletinus squarrosoides Snell & Dick (1936); Gyrodon castanellus (Peck) Singer (1938); Phylloporus squarrosoides (Snell & Dick) Singer (1938); Xerocomus squarrosoides (Snell & Dick) Singer (1945); Xerocomus castanellus (Peck) Snell & E.A.Dick (1958); Suillus castanellus (Peck) A.H.Sm. & Thiers (1964); Chalciporus castanellus (Peck) L.D.Gómez (1997)

= Bothia =

Genus of fungi

Bothia castanella Mycological characteristics
- Pores on hymenium
- Cap is convex or flat
- Hymenium is decurrent
- Stipe is bare
- Spore print is yellow-brown
- Ecology is mycorrhizal
- Edibility is unknown

Bothia is a fungal genus in the family Boletaceae. A monotypic genus, it contains the single species Bothia castanella, a bolete mushroom first described scientifically in 1900 from collections made in New Jersey. Found in the eastern United States, Costa Rica, China, and Taiwan, it grows in a mycorrhizal association with oak trees. Its fruit body is chestnut brown, the cap is smooth and dry, and the underside of the cap has radially elongated tubes. The spore deposit is yellow-brown. The edibility of the mushroom is unknown. Historically, its unique combination of morphological features resulted in the transfer of B. castanella to six different Boletaceae genera. Molecular phylogenetic analysis, published in 2007, demonstrated that the species was genetically unique enough to warrant placement in its own genus.

== Taxonomy ==
- - - - - - Several Xerocomus spp.
          - Bothia castanella
        - - - - Butyriboletus appendiculatus
              - Butyriboletus regius
            - Boletus speciosus
          - Boletus fechtneri
      - - Phylloboletellus chloephorus
        - Pseudoboletus parasiticus
    - Fistulinella viscida

Phylogeny of B. castanella and related boletus based on nuclear large subunit (LSU) ribosomal DNA sequences.

The bolete was first named Boletinus castanellus by American mycologist Charles Horton Peck in 1900. The type was collected in New Jersey by botanist Edward Sterling. William Alphonso Murrill transferred it to Boletinellus in 1909; his generic concept of Boletinus included a ring on the stipe. Rolf Singer placed it in Gyrodon in 1938, while Wally Snell and Esther Dick thought the species to be more appropriately placed in Xerocomus, and transferred it to that genus in 1958. Alexander H. Smith and Harry D. Thiers moved it to Suillus in their 1964 treatment of North American species. In more recent history (1996), it has been moved to Chalciporus. Snell and Dick's Boletinus squarrosoides (later moved by different authors to Phylloporus, Xerocomus, and Chalciporus) is a facultative synonym (based on a different type) of B. castanella. In their original 1936 publication, they compared the two species, and noted that Boletinus squarrosoides differed from B. castanellus by "reddish brown color, terete scaliness, and yellow colors of the flesh, tubes and stipe". By 1958, after having examined additional collections, they realized that the two species were conspecific and represented morphological variations of each other.

In 2007, Roy Halling and colleagues published molecular analysis showing that the species was genetically and morphologically distinct enough to deserve placement in a new Boletaceae genus, which they named Bothia. Since the original type has been lost, they designated a neotype from a collection made in Reading, Pennsylvania. Bothia is named in honor of mycologist Ernst E. Both, formerly curator emeritus of the Buffalo Museum of Science, and "promoter, facilitator and consummate student of boletology". The specific epithet castanella, which means "small chestnut", refers to the color of the cap.

== Description ==
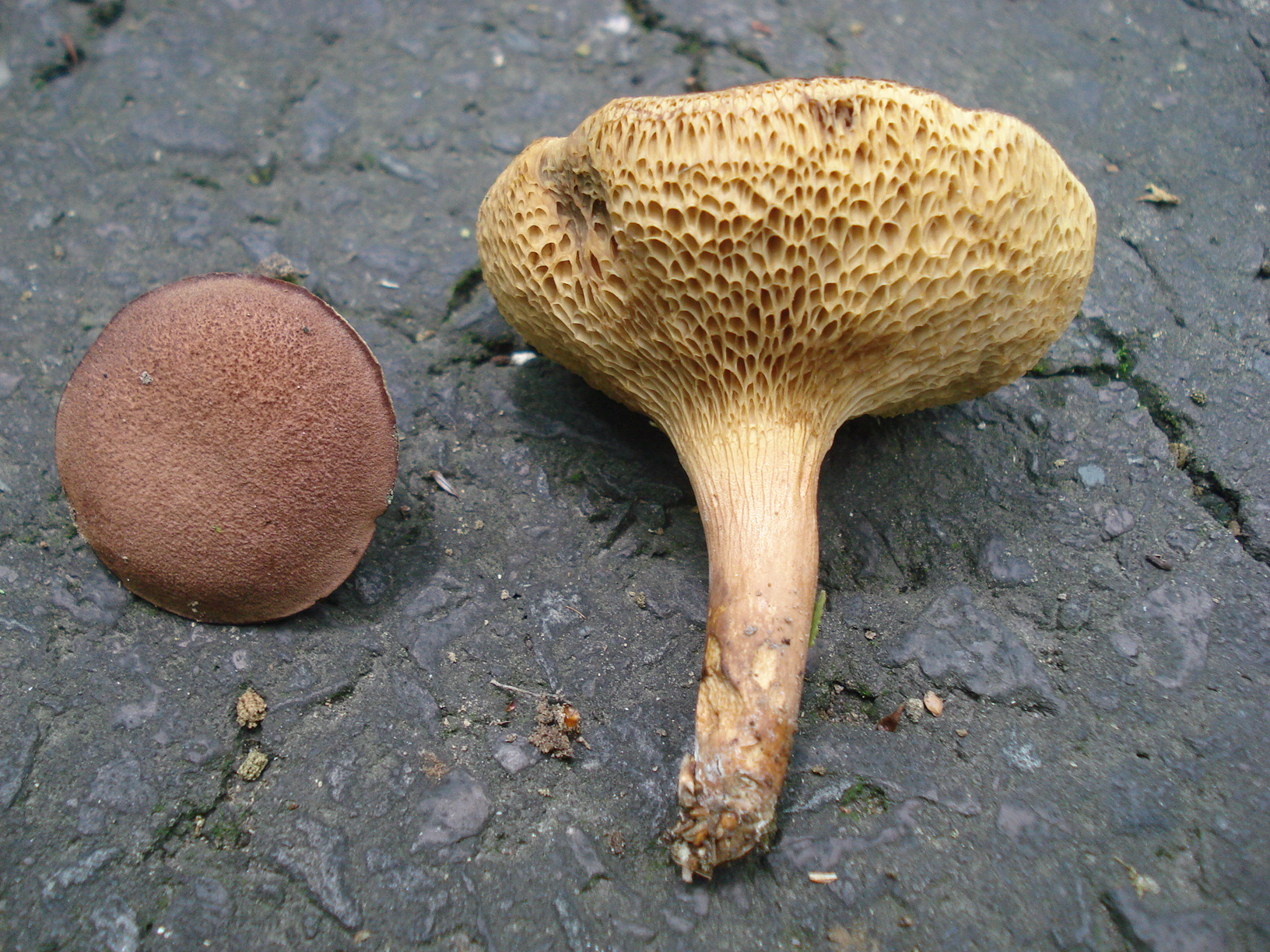
The pores are angular to elongated, with a slightly decurrent stipe attachment.

The cap of Bothia castanella is convex at first before flattening out in age, reaching a diameter of 3–8 cm (1.2–3.1 in). The center of the cap sometimes acquires a shallow depression, while the margin ranges from even to wavy and irregular. The cap surface is dry and initially hairy, but becomes smooth in maturity. Its color ranges from reddish brown to burgundy-brown to dark yellowish brown. The flesh is white, and, unlike several other bolete species, does not change color when bruised or injured. It is about 8 mm (0.3 in) thick.

On the cap undersurface are the pores, which are angular to elongated and measure about 2 mm wide. The color of the pore surface is pinkish brown to tan or buff, but it becomes yellowish brown in maturity; bruised areas turn ochre-tawny. The tubes are somewhat decurrent attached to the stipe (i.e., running slightly down its length), and extend about 6 mm (0.24 in) deep. The mushroom lacks any appreciable odor or taste. The dry, solid stipe measures 2–7 cm (0.8–2.8 in) long by 0.6–2 cm (0.2–0.8 in) thick, and is nearly equal in thickness throughout, or slightly tapered on either end. Its surface is more or less smooth except for a reticulate (meshed) area at the apex. The edibility of the mushroom is unknown.

Fruit bodies produce a yellow-brown spore print. Spores are egg-shaped to ellipsoid, smooth, thin-walled, and measure 8.4–10.5 by 4.2–4.9 μm. The basidia (spore-bearing cells) are club-shaped, four-spored, and measure 25–35 by 7–9 μm. Cystidia are present on both the tube walls (as pleurocystidia) and abundantly on the edges (as cheilocystidia). They are somewhat spindle-shaped, sometimes with a central swelling, and measure 45–70 by 7–12 μm. Clamp connections are absent from the hyphae, and all of the hyphae are inamyloid.

Several chemical tests can used to help confirm identification of the mushroom. The cap cuticle turns grayish with the application of a drop of ferrous sulfate (FeSO_{4}), and dark brown to amber with a dilute solution of potassium hydroxide (KOH). The flesh turns pale brown with KOH, and pale yellow with ammonia (NH_{4}OH).

== Habitat and distribution ==
The fruit bodies of Bothia castanella grow singly, scattered, or in groups under oak, although other trees such as birch, beech, hickory, eastern white pine, and hemlock are sometimes present in the area. Typical habitats include woods and parklands. In Asia it has been recorded growing in bamboo forests.

In the United States, where the fruiting season occurs from July to October, its range extends from the Carolinas north to New York and New England, and west to Minnesota. It has also been collected from Costa Rica, China, and Taiwan.
