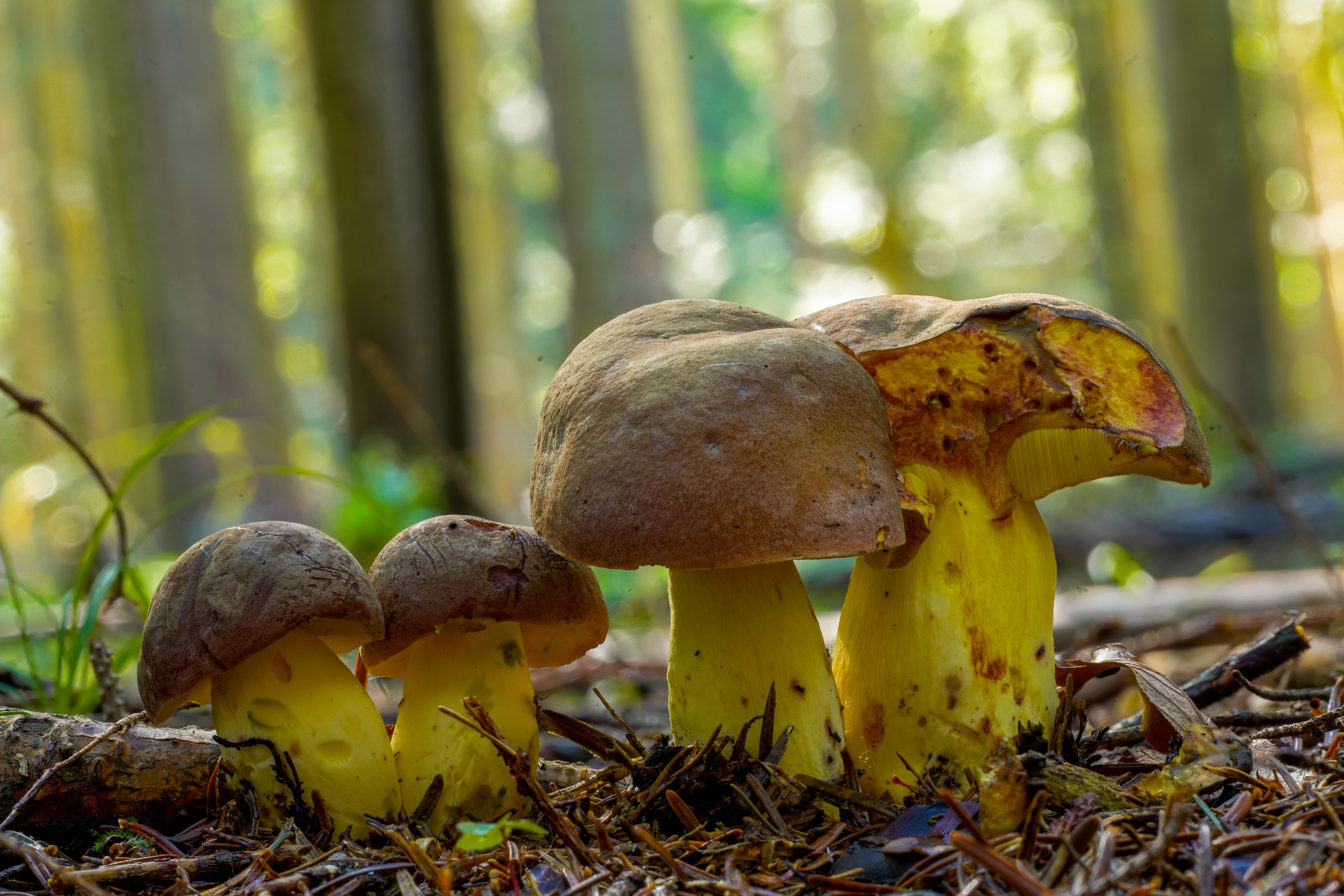

Scientific classification
- Domain: Eukaryota
- Kingdom: Fungi
- Division: Basidiomycota
- Class: Agaricomycetes
- Order: Boletales
- Family: Boletaceae
- Genus: Butyriboletus
- Species: B. roseogriseus

Binomial name
- Butyriboletus roseogriseus (J.Šutara, M.Graca, M.Kolarík, V.Janda & M.Kríž) Vizzini & Gelardi (2014)

Synonyms
- Boletus roseogriseus J.Šutara, M.Graca, M.Kolarík, V.Janda & M.Kríž (2014)

= Butyriboletus roseogriseus =

Species of bolete fungus

Butyriboletus roseogriseus is a pored mushroom in the family Boletaceae found in Europe, originally described as a species of Boletus in 2014 before being transferred to the newly created genus Butyriboletus later that same year. The fungus produces large caps 70–120 mm in diameter that start light pink or greyish-pink when young before shifting to grey, ochraceous or brown, with bright yellow tubes and pores that bruise greenish-blue on contact, and a stout yellow stipe featuring a distinctive net-like pattern. It is known only from a few localities in the Maple Mountains of eastern Moravia, Czech Republic, where it forms beneficial relationships primarily with silver fir in submontane forests at 575–610 metres above sea level.

== Taxonomy ==
The fungus was originally described as a species of Boletus in 2014, but transferred later that year to the newly created genus Butyriboletus.

== Description ==
The cap (pileus) of Boletus roseogriseus is 70–120 mm in diameter at maturity, initially hemispherical before flattening to a convex or cushion-shaped form. Its surface is matte, covered in velutinous (silky) to somewhat tomentose fibres that may develop a finely floccose (wooly) to granulose texture with age, and young specimens often appear pruinose. Colouration is variable—light pink or greyish pink when young, later shifting to grey, ochraceous or brown, though pink or reddish tinges frequently persist at the margin. Beneath the cap cuticle, the flesh is yellow or light yellowish, turning brown towards the stipe base. The tubes of the hymenophore reach up to 20 mm long and the round pores up to 1 mm across; both are bright yellow and bruise greenish-blue or deep blue on contact. The stout stipe, up to 90 mm long and 50 mm wide, is uniformly yellow with a distinct yellow reticulation (web-like pattern) on its upper portion, bruising blue and sometimes staining rusty brown where damaged.

Microscopically, the cap cuticle (pileipellis) forms a filamentous trichoderm of hyphae 3–8.5 μm wide, lacking conspicuous incrustations and accounting for the matt appearance. The hymenophoral trama is bilateral and boletoid. Basidia are mostly four-spored, club-shaped (clavate) cells measuring 28–44.5 × 8.5–12.5 μm. Cystidia on the gill faces (pleurocystidia) and edges (cheilocystidia) vary from cylindrical to fusiform or lageniform and can reach up to 61 μm in length. The stipe surface bears a fertile caulohymenium with caulobasidia and caulocystidia up to 58 μm long. Basidiospores are smooth, fusoid–ellipsoid with a slight suprahilar depression, typically 12–14.5 × 5.2–6.5 μm, and appear yellowish to brownish in Melzer's reagent.

The taste of Butyriboletus roseogriseus is mild, with a pleasant mushroom-like aroma. The combination of a matte, variably coloured pileus retaining pink margins, vivid yellow tubes and a reticulate stipe that bruises rapidly blue, together with its broad, smooth spores, provides a clear diagnostic profile for B. roseogriseus.

== Habitat and distribution ==
Boletus roseogriseus is known only from a few localities in the Maple Mountains near Francova Lhota in east Moravia, Czech Republic, where it fruits in submontane forest belts at 575–610 m above sea level. It appears to form ectomycorrhizal associations principally with silver fir (Abies alba), growing on the forest floor among needle and twig litter from July to early October, with peak abundance in August. Soils at these sites derive from claystone and sandstone of the Carpathian Flysch Belt and range from slightly acidic to moderately alkaline in pH.

Fruit bodies occur singly or in small groups under mature fir or mixed fir–spruce stands, sometimes emerging amid bilberry (Vaccinium myrtillus) cushions. Although hazel (Corylus avellana), Scots pine (Pinus sylvestris), aspen (Populus tremula), rowan (Sorbus aucuparia), silver birch (Betula pendula), European larch (Larix decidua) and pedunculate oak (Quercus robur) are present at these sites, only silver fir appears essential for its development. As of 2014, no records of B. roseogriseus extend beyond these East Moravian microlocalities.
