= Amanita grandispora =

Scientific classification
- Kingdom: Fungi
- Division: Basidiomycota
- Class: Agaricomycetes
- Order: Agaricales
- Family: Amanitaceae
- Genus: Amanita
- Species: A. grandispora

Binomial name
- Amanita grandispora (G.W. Beaton, Pegler & T.W.K. Young) Justo

Amanita grandispora
- Mycological characteristics
- Glebal hymenium
- No distinct cap
- Hymenium attachment is not applicable
- Lacks a stipe
- Spore print is white
- Ecology is mycorrhizal
- Edibility is unknown

Amanita grandispora is an Australian, truffle-like mushroom species with underground fruiting bodies, it used to belong to the genus Alpova but later moved to Amarrendia and then the genus Amanita, specifically within the section Amarrendiae. It forms ectomycorrhizal relationships with trees like Eucalyptus, with its spores, peridium, and gleba having a white to cream color and other distinct characteristics.
