= Gyrodon ripicola =

Scientific classification
- Domain: Eukaryota
- Kingdom: Fungi
- Division: Basidiomycota
- Class: Agaricomycetes
- Order: Boletales
- Family: Paxillaceae
- Genus: Gyrodon
- Species: G. ripicola

Binomial name
- Gyrodon ripicola (Corner) Pegler & T.W.K.Young (1981)

Synonyms
- Paxillus ripicola Corner (1971)

Species of fungus

Gyrodon ripicola is a bolete fungus in the family Paxillaceae. Found in Singapore, the species was first described in 1971 by E.J.H. Corner as a species of Paxillus. Pegler and Young transferred it to the genus Gyrodon in 1981.
