= Gyrodon miretipes =

Scientific classification
- Domain: Eukaryota
- Kingdom: Fungi
- Division: Basidiomycota
- Class: Agaricomycetes
- Order: Boletales
- Family: Paxillaceae
- Genus: Gyrodon
- Species: G. miretipes

Binomial name
- Gyrodon miretipes Heinem. & Rammeloo, 1983

Species of mushroom

Gyrodon miretipes is a bolete mushroom described in 1983 from Burundi. it has a red-brown cap and stipe, and yellow-tan decurrent gills.
