= Gyrodon crassipes =

Scientific classification
- Domain: Eukaryota
- Kingdom: Fungi
- Division: Basidiomycota
- Class: Agaricomycetes
- Order: Boletales
- Family: Paxillaceae
- Genus: Gyrodon
- Species: G. crassipes

Binomial name
- Gyrodon crassipes Heinem. & Rammeloo, 1983

Species of fungus

Gyrodon crassipes is a bolete mushroom described in 1983 from Ethiopia. it has a cinnamon-coloured cap that turns black-brown to touch, decurrent gills and a brown stem.
