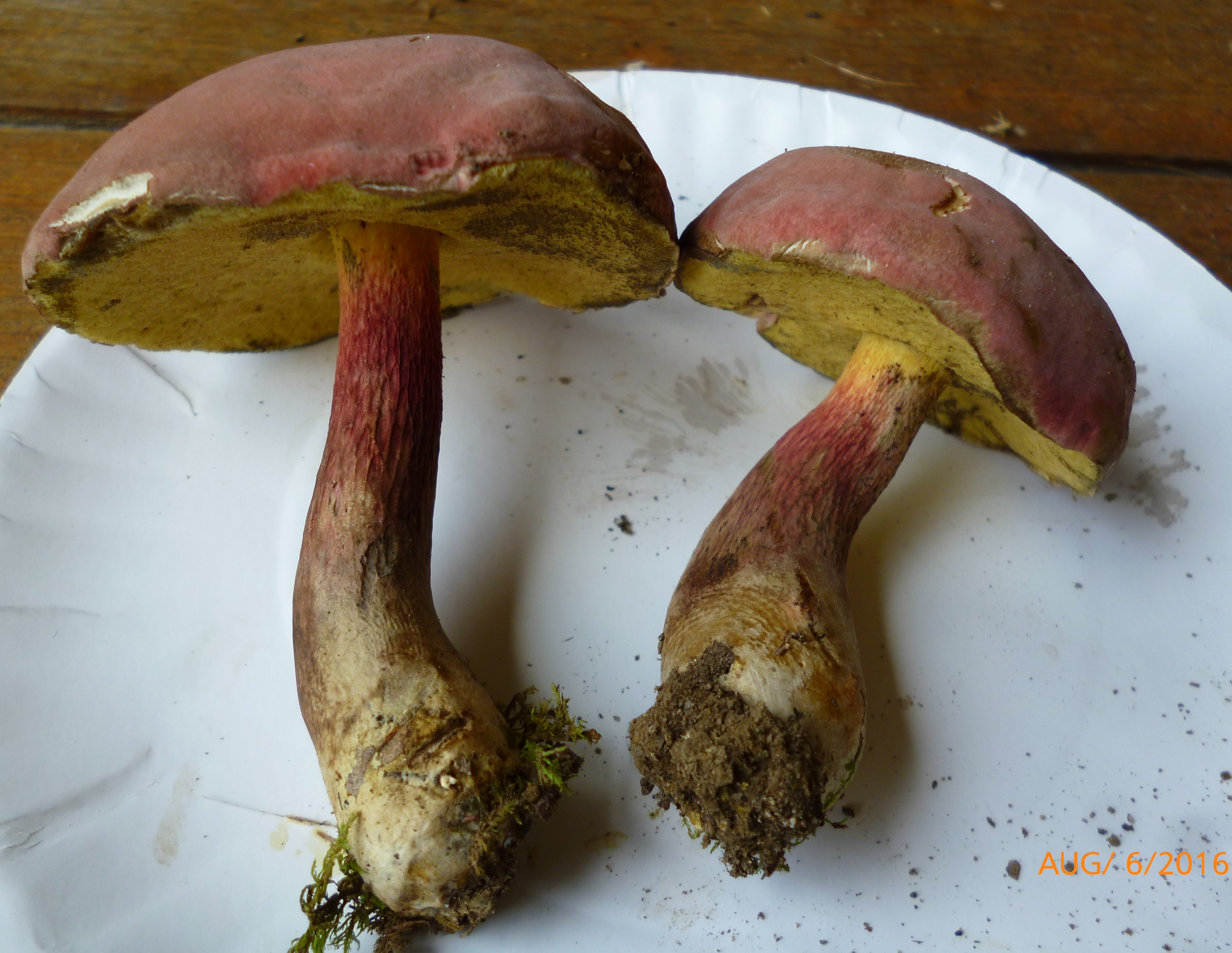

Scientific classification
- Kingdom: Fungi
- Division: Basidiomycota
- Class: Agaricomycetes
- Order: Boletales
- Family: Boletaceae
- Genus: Butyriboletus
- Species: B. peckii

Binomial name
- Butyriboletus peckii (Frost) Kuan Zhao, Zhu L. Yang & Halling (2015)

Synonyms
- Boletus peckii Frost (1878); Ceriomyces peckii (Frost) Murrill (1909); Caloboletus peckii (Frost) Vizzini (2014)

= Butyriboletus peckii =

Species of fungus

Butyriboletus peckii is a fungus of the genus Butyriboletus native to eastern North America. It was first described by Charles Christopher Frost in 1878. Until 2014, it was known as Boletus peckii. Recent changes in the phylogenetic framework of the Boletaceae prompted the transfer of this species, along with several other related boletes, including Caloboletus calopus, to the genus Caloboletus. In 2015, Kuan Zhao and colleagues published analysis that demonstrated that the bolete belongs to Butyriboletus, closely related to Butyriboletus pulchriceps.

== See also ==
- List of North American boletes
