= Gyrodon intermedius =

Scientific classification
- Kingdom: Fungi
- Division: Basidiomycota
- Class: Agaricomycetes
- Order: Boletales
- Family: Paxillaceae
- Genus: Gyrodon
- Species: G. intermedius

Binomial name
- Gyrodon intermedius (Pat.) Singer

Synonyms
- Boletinellus intermedius (Pat.) E.-J. Gilbert; Boletus intermedius (Pat.) Sacc. & P. Syd., 1899; Phylloporus intermedius Pat., 1895; Suillus intermedius (Pat.) Kuntze

Species of fungus

Gyrodon intermedius is a bolete fungus in the family Paxillaceae native to Africa, where it has been recorded from Congo, Liberia and Madagascar.
