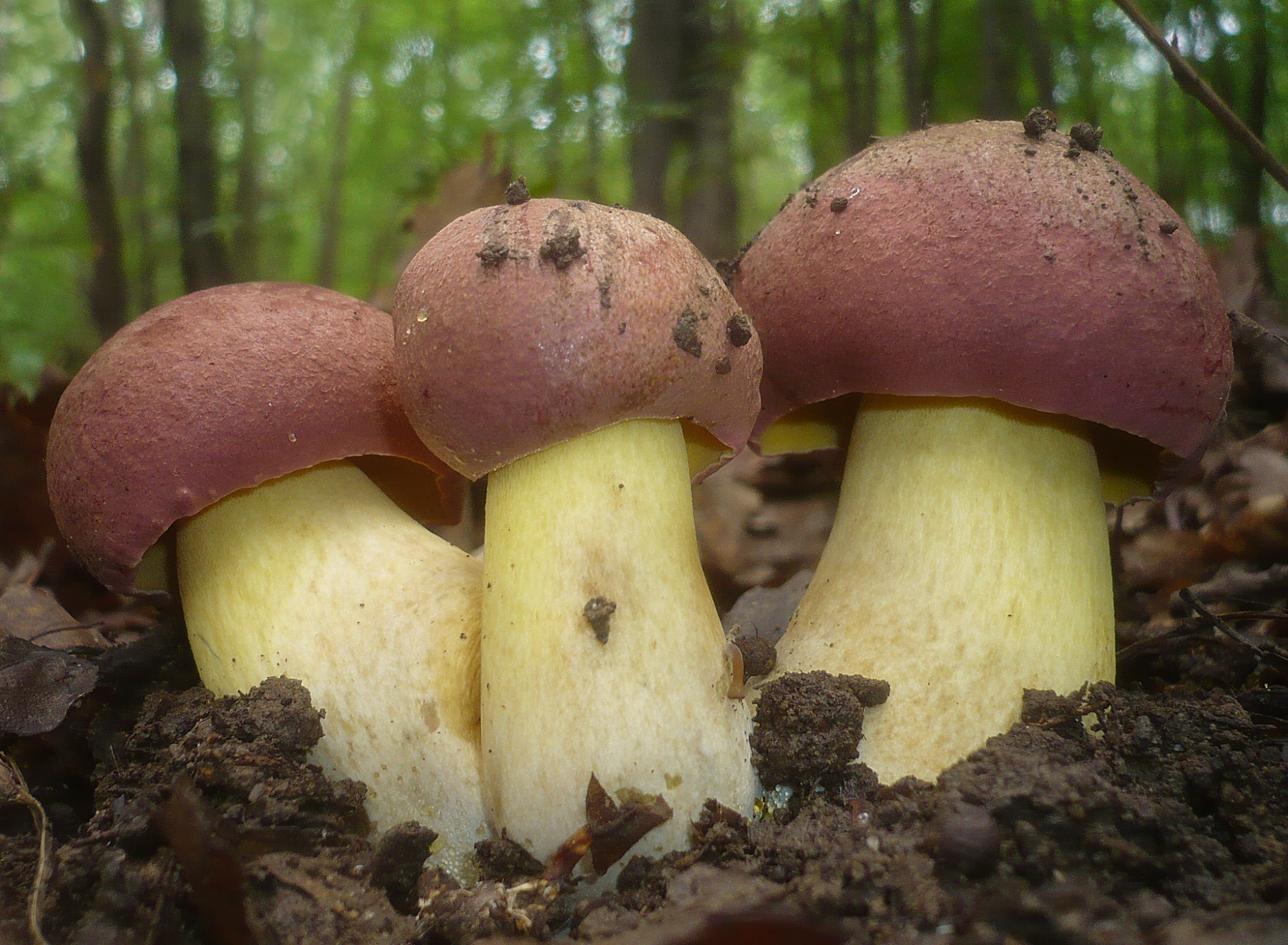

Scientific classification
- Kingdom: Fungi
- Division: Basidiomycota
- Class: Agaricomycetes
- Order: Boletales
- Family: Boletaceae
- Genus: Butyriboletus
- Species: B. fuscoroseus

Binomial name
- Butyriboletus fuscoroseus (Smotl.) Vizzini & Gelardi (2014)

Synonyms
- Boletus fuscoroseus Smotl. (1912); Boletus pseudoregius (Heinr. Huber) Estadès (1988)

= Butyriboletus fuscoroseus =

Species of bolete fungus

Butyriboletus fuscoroseus is a pored mushroom in the family Boletaceae. It was formerly considered a species of Boletus, but in 2014 was transferred to the newly created genus Butyriboletus. Boletus pseudoregius, a European taxon originally described as a subspecies of Boletus appendiculatus in 1927, is a synonym. B. fuscoroseus is considered critically endangered in the Czech Republic.

== Description ==
Butyriboletus fuscoroseus produces a robust basidiocarp with a convex cap (pileus) up to 20 cm across. Young caps are hemispherical before flattening, and display colours ranging from violet-brown to reddish-brown, occasionally dull red; older specimens often fade to beige with a faint pink tint. The margin typically retains remnants of the partial veil (appendiculate).

Beneath the cap, the tubes measure up to 1.5 cm long and are bright yellow, developing an olive tinge with age; both tubes and pores bruise blue when handled. The stipe is stout, up to 10 cm long and 3 cm thick, cylindrical to club-shaped, yellow near the apex and tinged pink to red towards the base, usually with a well-developed reticulation of the same colour; it too bruises blue on handling.

The context (flesh) is whitish in the cap and lemon yellow in the stipe, shading to clay pink at the stipe base and turning blue on exposure. The odour is indistinct in young fruit bodies but in maturity may become medicinal or paint-like, and when dried can resemble smoked meat or chicory; taste is mild to slightly acidic.

Microscopically, the spores are ellipsoid, measuring about 10–14.5 × 4–5.5 micrometres (μm), each containing one to three large oil droplets. The basidia (spore-bearing cells) are club-shaped and four-spored, and the cystidia measure roughly 36–52 × 9–14.5 μm. The cap surface (pileipellis) is a trichoderm of interwoven, slightly incrusted hyphae with rounded terminal cells. Chemical spot tests produce only slight reactions with ammonia (NH_{4}OH) and potassium hydroxide (KOH) solution, and no change with iron(II) sulphate (FeSO_{4}) or Melzer's reagent.

== Habitat and distribution ==
The fruiting bodies of Butyriboletus fuscoroseus develop in warm, dry to moderately moist broadleaf woodlands, most often under oak (Quercus spp.), and frequently on calcareous soils at elevations from near sea level up to about 800 m. In Bulgaria, it typically appears from June through September, corresponding with the summer season. Within Bulgaria, confirmed localities extend along the Southern Black Sea coast, the Eastern Forebalkan, the western and eastern flanks of the Stara Planina mountains, the Sofia region and the Eastern Rhodope range. Beyond Bulgaria, it occurs across much of southern and central Europe—including Austria, Belgium, Czech Republic, France, Greece, Hungary, Italy, Spain and the Balkan states—and its range reaches into Turkey.
