= Gyrodon tennesseensis =

Scientific classification
- Domain: Eukaryota
- Kingdom: Fungi
- Division: Basidiomycota
- Class: Agaricomycetes
- Order: Boletales
- Family: Paxillaceae
- Genus: Gyrodon
- Species: G. tennesseensis

Binomial name
- Gyrodon tennesseensis (Snell & A.H.Sm.) Snell & Hesler (1941)

Synonyms
- Boletus tennesseensis Snell & A.H.Sm. (1940)

Species of fungus

Gyrodon tennesseensis is a bolete fungus in the family Paxillaceae. It was originally described in 1940 by Wally Snell and Alexander H. Smith as a species of Boletus. Snell and Hesler transferred it to Gyrodon a year later. It is found in the United States and Canada.
