= Alpova komoviana =

Scientific classification
- Kingdom: Fungi
- Division: Basidiomycota
- Class: Agaricomycetes
- Order: Boletales
- Family: Paxillaceae
- Genus: Alpova
- Species: A. komoviana

Binomial name
- Alpova komoviana B.Perić & P.-A.Moreau, 2013

Species of fungi

Alpova komoviana is a species of ectomycorrhizal sequestrate fungus in the family Paxillaceae (order Boletales). It was first described as a new species in 2013 from collections made in Montenegro.

== Taxonomy ==
The species was formally described in 2012 by mycologists Branislav Perić and Pierre-Arthur Moreau. The holotype was collected in August 2010 in the Komovi Mountains (Bindža and Vučji potok), Montenegro, under Alnus incana. The specific epithet komoviana refers to the Komovi massif.

== Description ==
Basidiomata: The fruit bodies (basidiomata) are hypogeous (underground), subglobose to irregularly elongated, measuring 10–35 × 10–28 mm. The gleba is gelatinous, firm when young and softening with age, changing in colour from ochre to vinaceous pink or red-brown at maturity, with intermixed white veins forming an irregular reticulum.

Peridium: Two-layered. The peridiopellis is bright foxy-orange in KOH, 30–55 μm thick, made of catenulate hyphae. The subpellis is thick (320–350 μm) and pseudoparenchymatous (textura globulosa).

Spores: Basidiospores are fusiform to cylindro-fusiform, measuring (5.2)6.3–7.33–8.3(9.4) × (2.6)2.7–3.09–3.5(4.0) μm. They are smooth, almost colourless in Melzer's reagent, and have a thickened wall up to 0.8–1 μm. Some larger sclerospores may be present.

Microscopic features: Basidia are 17–22 × 4–6 μm, cylindro-clavate, producing 8–10 spores. Clamp connections are present at all septa. The gleba contains characteristic "buffer cells" and thromboplerous hyphae with brown intracellular content. No parts of the fruit body are dextrinoid or amyloid.

== Distribution ==
Alpova komoviana is so far known only from the Komovi Mountains in Montenegro.

== Habitat ==
It occurs in riparian forests under Alnus incana (grey alder), sometimes mixed with Abies alba (silver fir) or Fagus moesiaca (Balkan beech). It forms ectomycorrhizal associations exclusively with Alnus incana ssp. incana.

== Phylogeny ==
Molecular phylogenetic analyses based on ITS, gpd, and rpb2 gene sequences place A. komoviana in a basal position within the Alnus-associated Alpova lineage. It is distinguished from other European Alpova species (e.g., A. alpestris, A. corsicus) by its longer spores, the presence of thromboplerous hyphae in the gleba, and a thick, foxy-orange peridiopellis in KOH.
