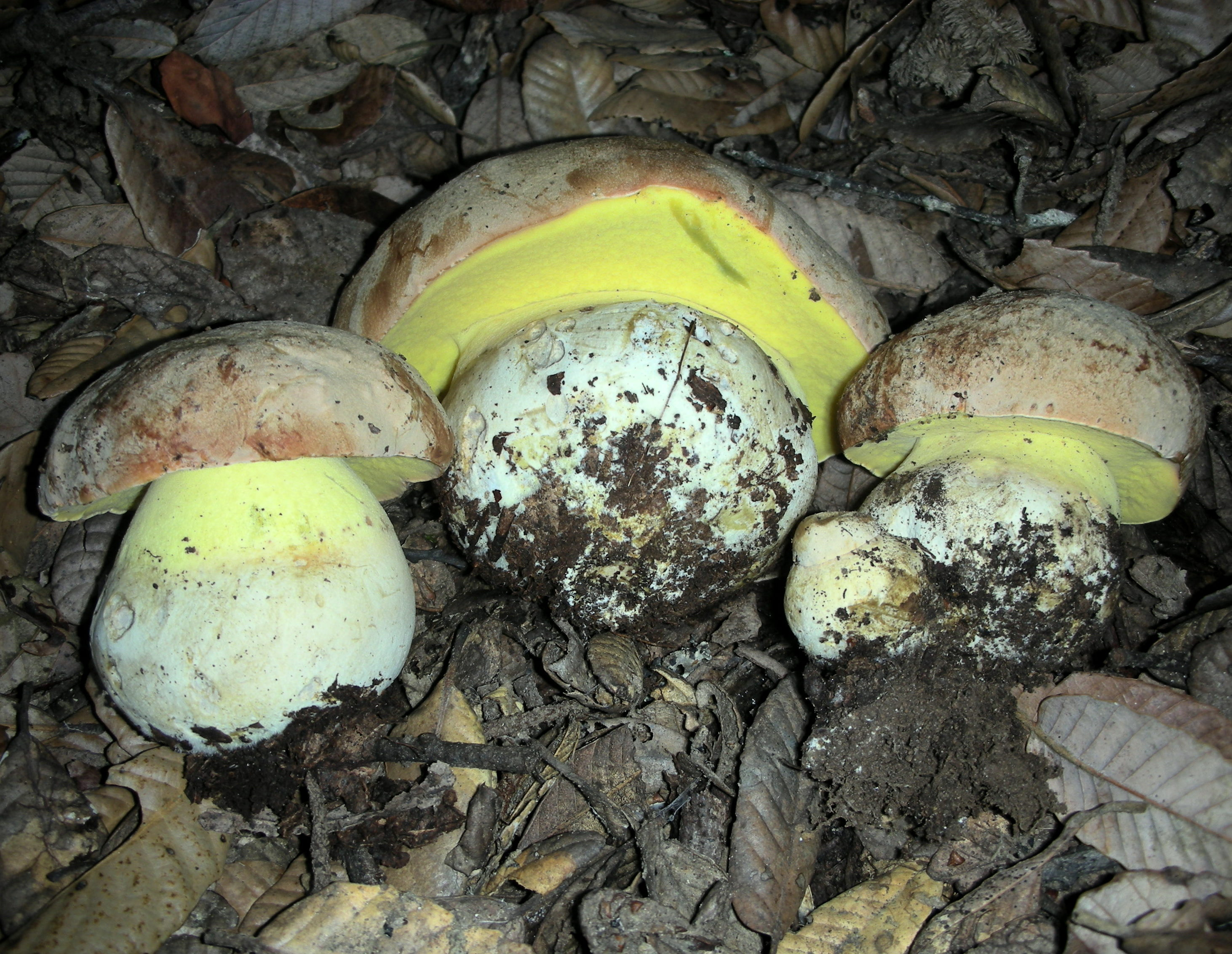

Scientific classification
- Domain: Eukaryota
- Kingdom: Fungi
- Division: Basidiomycota
- Class: Agaricomycetes
- Order: Boletales
- Family: Boletaceae
- Genus: Butyriboletus
- Species: B. persolidus

Binomial name
- Butyriboletus persolidus D.Arora & J.L.Frank (2014)

= Butyriboletus persolidus =

Species of fungus

Butyriboletus persolidus is a pored mushroom in the family Boletaceae. It was described as new to science in 2014.

The light brown cap is 6–14 centimetres (2 1/4–5 1/2 in) wide. The stipe is 5–9 cm (2–3 1/2 in) tall and 2.5–5 cm (1–2 in) thick. The flesh is yellow and can stain light blue; it has a mild taste. The spore print is brown. Outside of its genus, it can resemble Caloboletus species.

From October to December, it can be found on the West Coast growing under hardwood trees, especially oak and tanoak.

== See also ==
- List of North American boletes
