= Hydnomerulius =

Scientific classification
- Kingdom: Fungi
- Division: Basidiomycota
- Class: Agaricomycetes
- Order: Boletales
- Family: Paxillaceae
- Genus: Hydnomerulius; Jarosch & Besl (2001)

Type species
- Hydnomerulius pinastri (Fr.) Jarosch & Besl (2001)

Synonyms
- Hydnum pinastri Fr. (1814); Sistotrema pinastri (Fr.) Pers. (1825); Acia pinastri (Fr.) P.Karst. (1979); Odontia pinastri (Fr.) Quél. (1880); Merulius pinastri (Fr.) Burt (1917); Gyrophana pinastri (Fr.) Bourdot & Galzin (1923); Serpula pinastri (Fr.) W.B.Cooke (1957); Leucogyrophana pinastri (Fr.) Ginns & Weresub (1976)

Genus of fungi

Hydnomerulius pinastri is a fungal species of the monotypic genus Hydnomerulius within the Paxillaceae family. H. pinastri is a saprophyte whose nutritional mode creates a brown rot through H_{2}O_{2} decay of cellulose and hemi-cellulose. This species has not been thoroughly studied outside of taxonomic attempts to place it within the fungal tree. As such, its ecological role beyond as a wood decaying agent is unclear at this time. H. pinastri may be referred to colloquially as "spiny dry rot" or "spiny dry rot fungus".

== Taxonomy ==
H. pinastri is the sole member of the Hydnomerulius genus. Its family is located within the Boletales order of Agaricomycetes, in the Basidiomycotan taxa.

=== Re-Classification ===
Described as a member of the Leucogyrophana family in 1976, Hydnomerulius was later coined as a monospecific clade for the species by M. Jarosch and H. Besl in 2001. Placement within the Hydnomerulius genus was determined after sequencing of the 28S gene along with staining characteristics determined this species to be more closely related to members of the Paxillaceae family than other Leucogyrophana.

== Description ==
=== Fruiting Body ===
As H. pinastri prepares to sporulate, it begins developing a smooth hymenium tissue at the fungal surface. As the resupinate body develops, it first begins to take a yellowish colour and ripple on the surface, followed by development of short (1-2 mm) hydnoid basidiocarp. Hyphal pigmentation at this time further darkens the bodies into a yellowish brown. Rhizomorphs may be present attaching the hymenophore to blackish sclerotia.

=== Vegetative Structure ===
H. pinastri develop mats of densely packed monomitic yellow-brown hyphae within their substrate. These vegetative hyphae are generally clamped with thin walls and a thickness between 2-5 micrometers wide. The mat is described as a wooly substance completely encompassed in a gelatinous matrix. Subicular hyphae develop slightly thicker walls and are generally 6-10 micrometers wide. These cluster together to form hyphal strands which are notably darkish brown to black. Clamp structures are much more sparse within the subicular layer.
