= Butyriboletus sanicibus =

Scientific classification
- Domain: Eukaryota
- Kingdom: Fungi
- Division: Basidiomycota
- Class: Agaricomycetes
- Order: Boletales
- Family: Boletaceae
- Genus: Butyriboletus
- Species: B. sanicibus

Binomial name
- Butyriboletus sanicibus D.Arora & J.L.Frank (2014)

Species of fungus

Butyriboletus sanicibus is a pored mushroom in the genus Butyriboletus. Found in China where it grows in association with Yunnan pine (Pinus yunnanensis), it was described as a new species in 2014.
