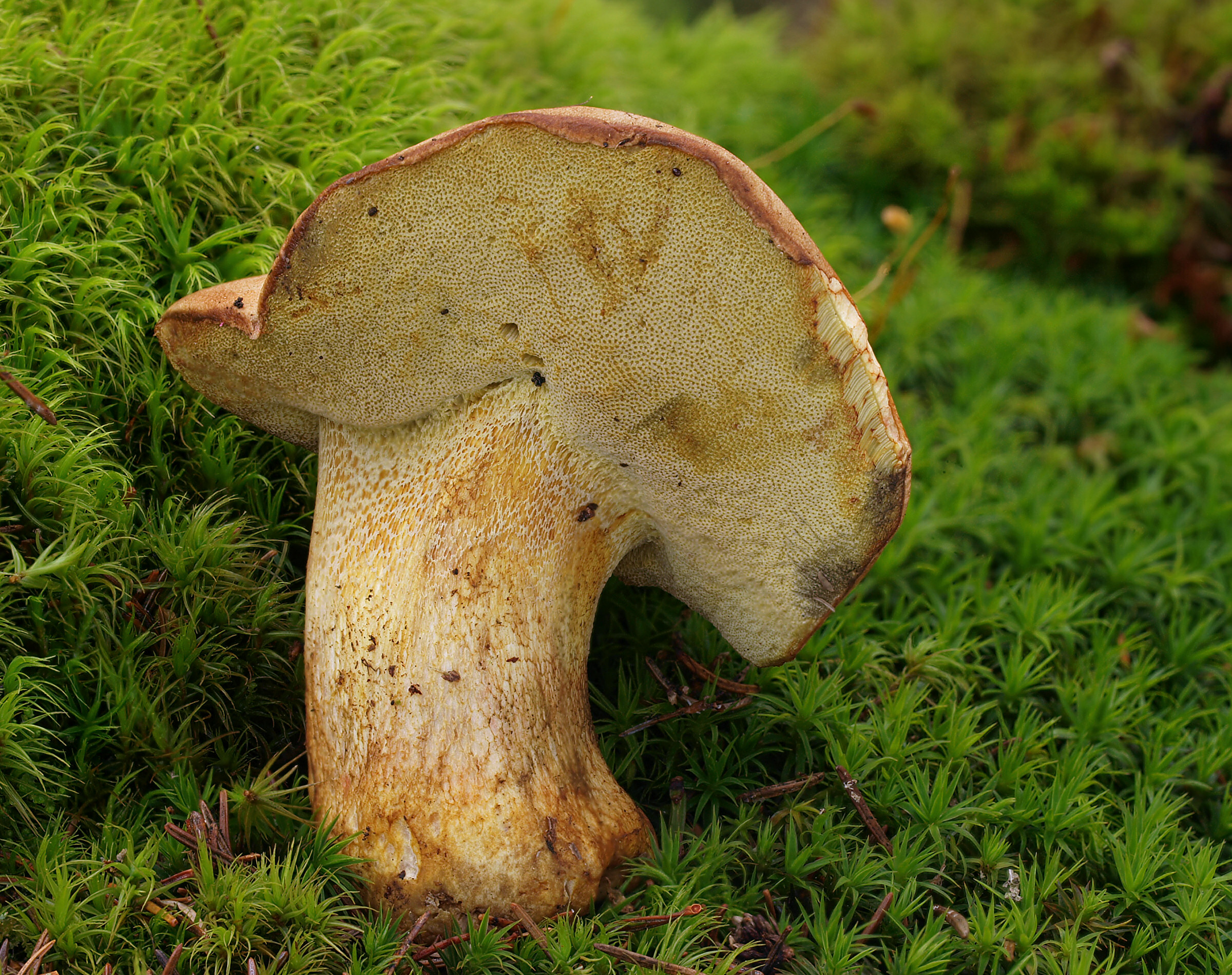

Scientific classification
- Kingdom: Fungi
- Division: Basidiomycota
- Class: Agaricomycetes
- Order: Boletales
- Family: Boletaceae
- Genus: Butyriboletus
- Species: B. subappendiculatus

Binomial name
- Butyriboletus subappendiculatus (Dermek, Lazebn. & J.Veselský) D.Arora & J.L.Frank (2014)

Synonyms
- Boletus subappendiculatus Dermek, Lazebn. & J.Veselský (1979)

= Butyriboletus subappendiculatus =

Species of bolete fungus

Butyriboletus subappendiculatus is a pored mushroom in the family Boletaceae. It was originally described as a species of Boletus in 1979 before being reclassified in the genus Butyriboletus in 2014. The fungus produces medium-sized fruiting bodies with brownish-orange to buff-coloured caps up to 8 cm across, lemon-yellow tubes and pores that do not bruise blue when damaged, and yellowish stipes covered with a fine network pattern. It fruits in upper-montane coniferous or mixed forests across Europe and into Turkey, primarily under Norway spruce or silver fir on neutral to calcareous soils at elevations of 1,200–1,700 metres.

== Taxonomy ==
This species was originally described as a species of Boletus in 1979, but later transferred to Butyriboletus in 2014.

== Description ==
Butyriboletus subappendiculatus produces a medium-sized basidiocarp with a cap (pileus) up to 8 cm across. The young cap is hemispherical, becoming convex to flat-convex and sometimes slightly depressed with age. Its surface is dry or, in older specimens, faintly viscid, smooth to finely fibrillose or cracked, and coloured from brownish orange or cinnamon to buff or grey buff. The cap flesh does not change colour when bruised, and the margin often retains fragments of the partial veil (appendiculate).

The tubes are up to 1 cm long and lemon yellow, maturing to a yellow with a faint olive tint; neither tubes nor pores bruise blue. The stipe measures up to 13 cm long and 5.5 cm thick, initially subspherical or ovoid before becoming club-shaped or cylindrical, often with a rooting base. It is pale yellowish-white to pastel yellow, occasionally discolouring to whitish or brownish, and may bear a zone of pale red to brownish-orange. A fine, concolorous reticulation covers much of the stipe, which likewise remains unchanging when handled. The flesh of the stipe is lemon yellow under the surface and fades to straw or whitish in deeper tissues; it shows no bluing on exposure. Odour and taste are mild and not distinctive.

Viewed under the microscope, the spores are smooth and oval, about 10–15 μm long and 3–4.5 μm wide (roughly two to four times as long as they are wide), and each usually contains one or more oil droplets. The basidia are four-spored and club-shaped (clavate), about 30–39.5 × 7–10 μm, and the cystidia measure 35.5–45 × 8–10.5 μm. The cap cuticle (pileipellis) forms a trichoderm of interwoven, septate, slightly encrusted hyphae with mostly cylindrical, rounded terminal cells. Spot-tests with ammonia (NH_{4}OH) and potassium hydroxide (KOH) solution yield yellow reactions, whereas iron(II) sulphate (FeSO_{4}) and Melzer's reagent (MR) produce no change.

== Habitat and distribution ==
Butyriboletus subappendiculatus fruits in upper-montane coniferous or mixed forests, most commonly under Norway spruce (Picea abies) or silver fir (Abies alba), on neutral to calcareous soils at elevations of 1,200–1,700 m. Fruiting occurs in midsummer, typically from July through August. In Bulgaria, it is known from the high-elevation woodlands of the Pirin and Rila mountains. More broadly, the species has been recorded wherever its coniferous hosts grow across Europe (Austria, Czech Republic, Germany, Spain, United Kingdom, Greece, France, Italy, Montenegro, Norway, Poland, Serbia, Slovenia and Slovakia) and extending into Turkey. It is considered endangered in the Czech Republic.
