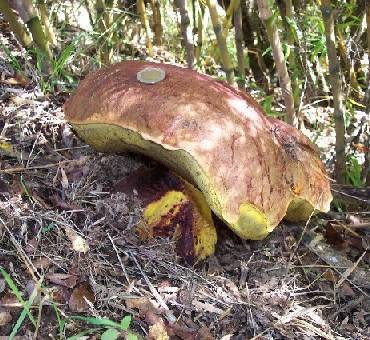

Conservation status
- Endangered (IUCN 3.1)

Scientific classification
- Kingdom: Fungi
- Division: Basidiomycota
- Class: Agaricomycetes
- Order: Boletales
- Family: Boletaceae
- Genus: Butyriboletus
- Species: B. loyo

Binomial name
- Butyriboletus loyo (Phillippi) Mikšík

Synonyms
- Boletus loyo Phillippi

= Butyriboletus loyo =

Species of fungus

Butyriboletus loyo is a species of bolete fungus in the family Boletaceae that is found in South America. It was described as new to science by Phillippi in Carlos Luigi Spegazzini's 1912 scientific documentation of collections in Argentina. The bolete is edible.
