= Meiorganum =

Scientific classification
- Kingdom: Fungi
- Division: Basidiomycota
- Class: Agaricomycetes
- Order: Boletales
- Family: Paxillaceae
- Genus: Meiorganum; R.Heim (1965)

Type species
- Meiorganum neocaledonicum R.Heim (1966)

Species
- M. neocaledonicum M. olivaceoflavidus

Genus of fungi

Meiorganum is a genus of fungi in the family Paxillaceae. The genus contains two species, distributed in Malaysia and New Caledonia.
