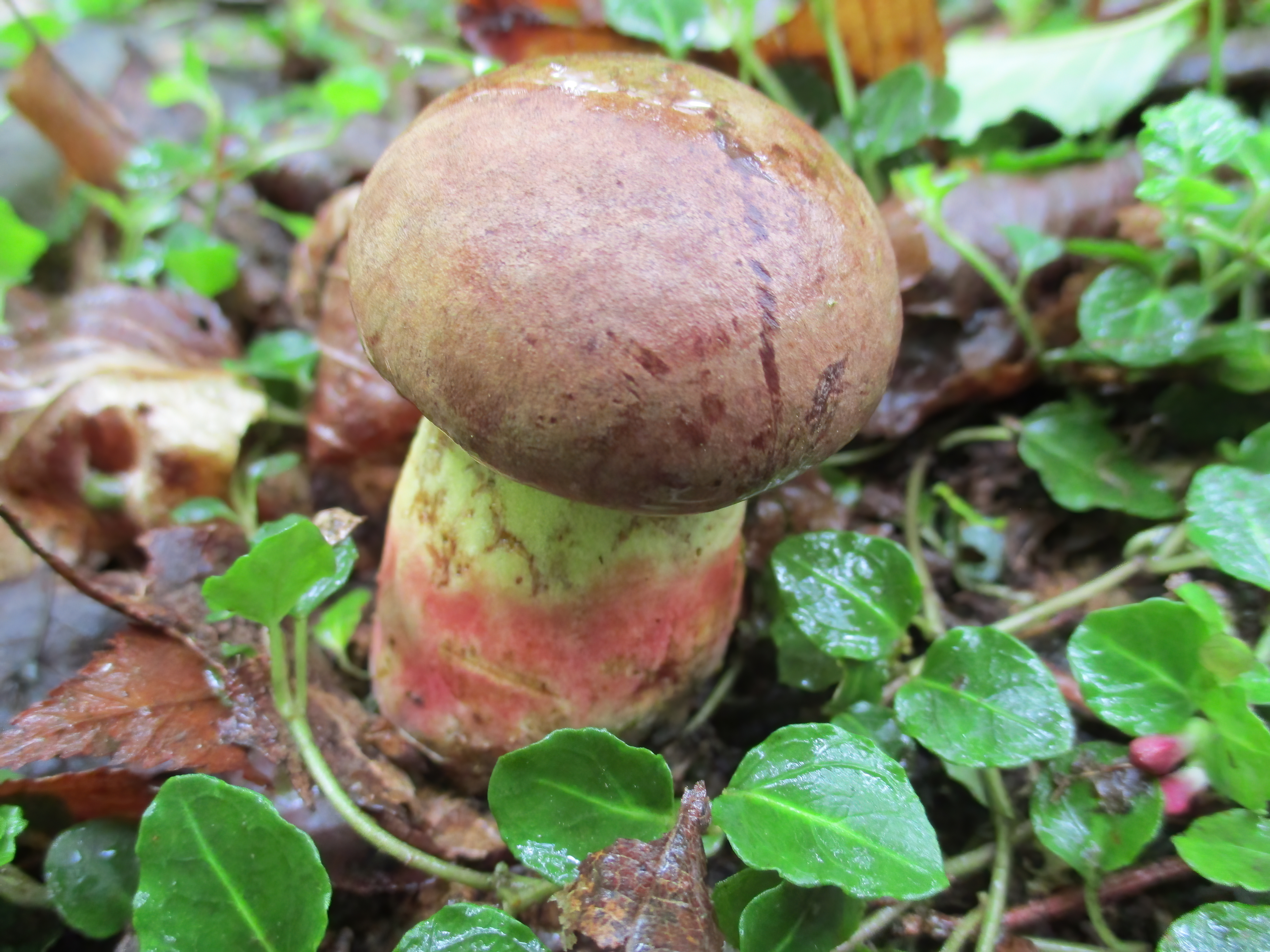

Scientific classification
- Domain: Eukaryota
- Kingdom: Fungi
- Division: Basidiomycota
- Class: Agaricomycetes
- Order: Boletales
- Family: Boletaceae
- Genus: Butyriboletus
- Species: B. brunneus

Binomial name
- Butyriboletus brunneus (Peck) D.Arora & J.L.Frank (2014)

Synonyms
- Boletus speciosus var. brunneus Peck (1890)

= Butyriboletus brunneus =

Species of fungus

Butyriboletus brunneus is a pored mushroom in the family Boletaceae. This North American species was originally described by Charles Horton Peck in 1890 as a variety of Boletus speciosus.

== See also ==
- List of North American boletes
