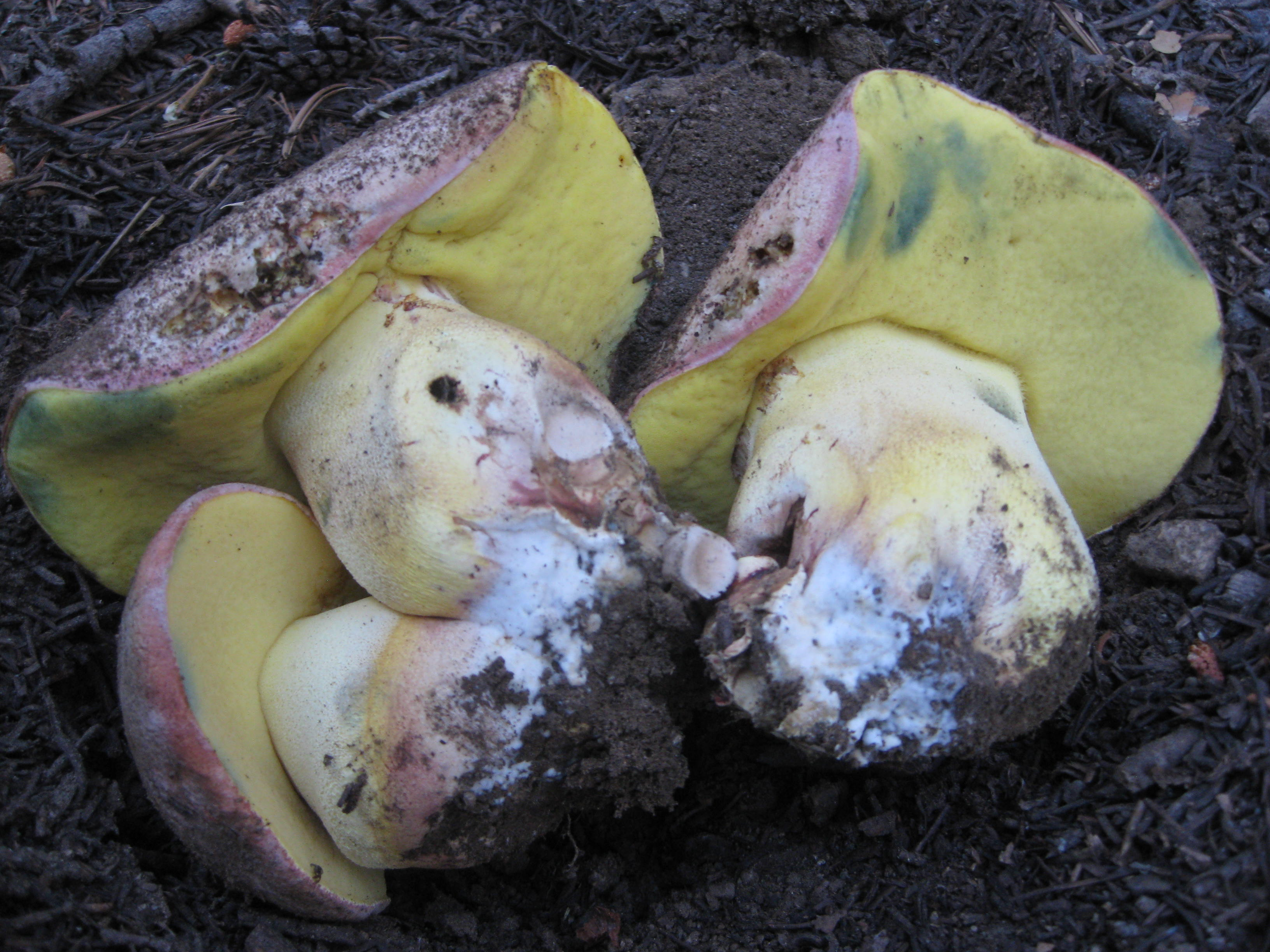

Scientific classification
- Domain: Eukaryota
- Kingdom: Fungi
- Division: Basidiomycota
- Class: Agaricomycetes
- Order: Boletales
- Family: Boletaceae
- Genus: Butyriboletus
- Species: B. abieticola

Binomial name
- Butyriboletus abieticola (Thiers) D.Arora & J.L.Frank (2014)

Synonyms
- Boletus abieticola Thiers (1975)

= Butyriboletus abieticola =

Species of fungus

Butyriboletus abieticola is a pored mushroom in the family Boletaceae. It was originally described in 1975 by mycologist Harry Delbert Thiers as a species of Boletus, but transferred in 2014 to the newly created genus Butyriboletus.

== See also ==
- List of North American boletes
