= Butyriboletus cepaeodoratus =

Scientific classification
- Domain: Eukaryota
- Kingdom: Fungi
- Division: Basidiomycota
- Class: Agaricomycetes
- Order: Boletales
- Family: Boletaceae
- Genus: Butyriboletus
- Species: B. cepaeodoratus

Binomial name
- Butyriboletus cepaeodoratus (Taneyama & Har.Takah.) Vizzini & Gelardi (2014)

Synonyms
- Boletus cepaeodoratus Taneyama & Har.Takah. (2013)

Species of fungus

Butyriboletus cepaeodoratus is a pored mushroom in the family Boletaceae. An Asian species, it was originally described in 2013 as a species of Boletus, but transferred to the newly created genus Butyriboletus the following year.
