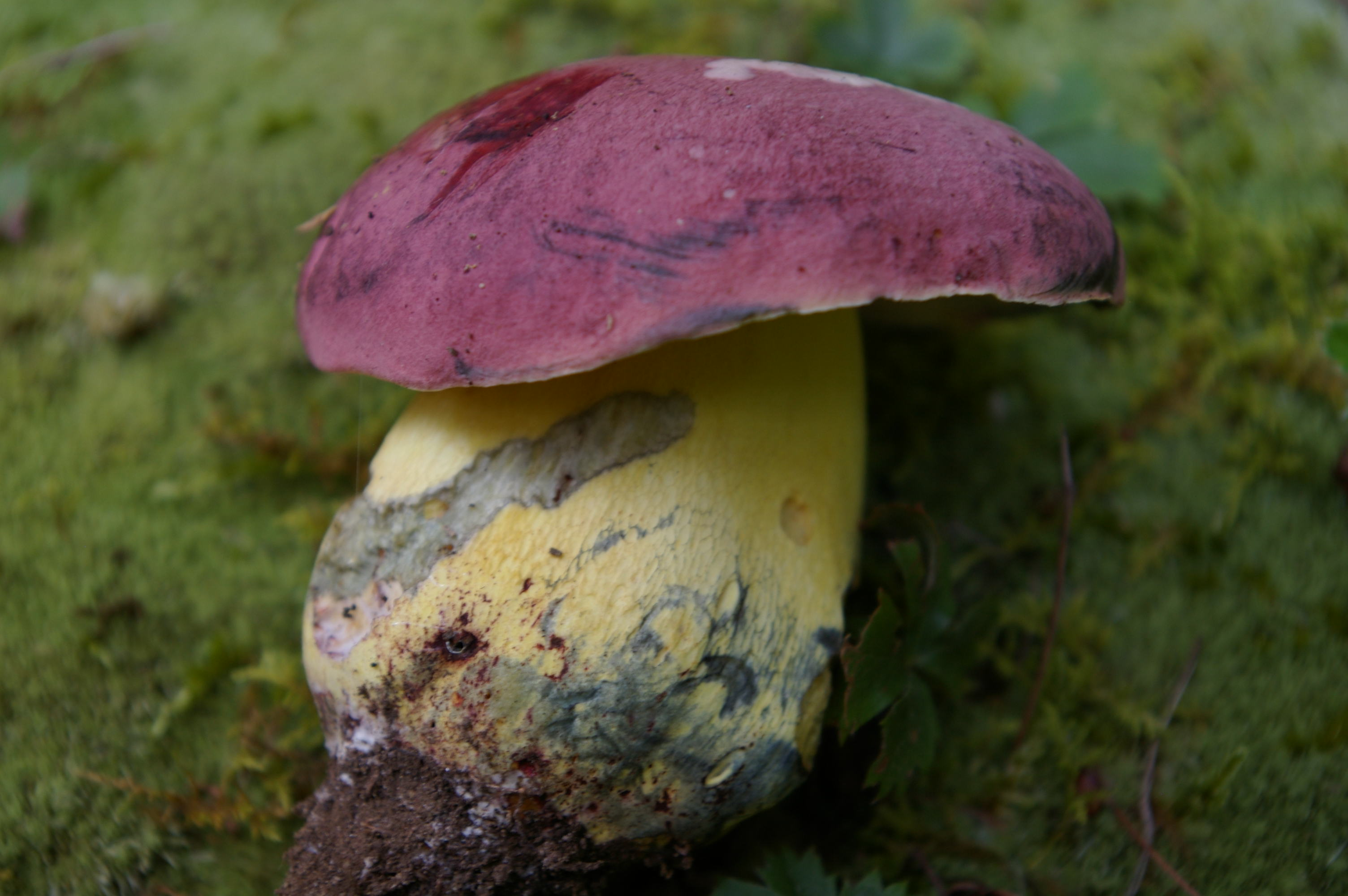

Scientific classification
- Domain: Eukaryota
- Kingdom: Fungi
- Division: Basidiomycota
- Class: Agaricomycetes
- Order: Boletales
- Family: Boletaceae
- Genus: Butyriboletus
- Species: B. roseopurpureus

Binomial name
- Butyriboletus roseopurpureus (Both, Bessette & Roody) Kuan Zhao, Gang Wu, Halling & Zhu L.Yang (2015)

Synonyms
- Boletus roseopurpureus Both, Bessette & Roody (2000)

= Butyriboletus roseopurpureus =

Species of fungus

Butyriboletus roseopurpureus is a species of fungus in the family Boletaceae. Found in eastern North America, it was officially described in 2000 as a species of Boletus, and transferred to the genus Butyriboletus in 2015.

== See also ==
- List of North American boletes
