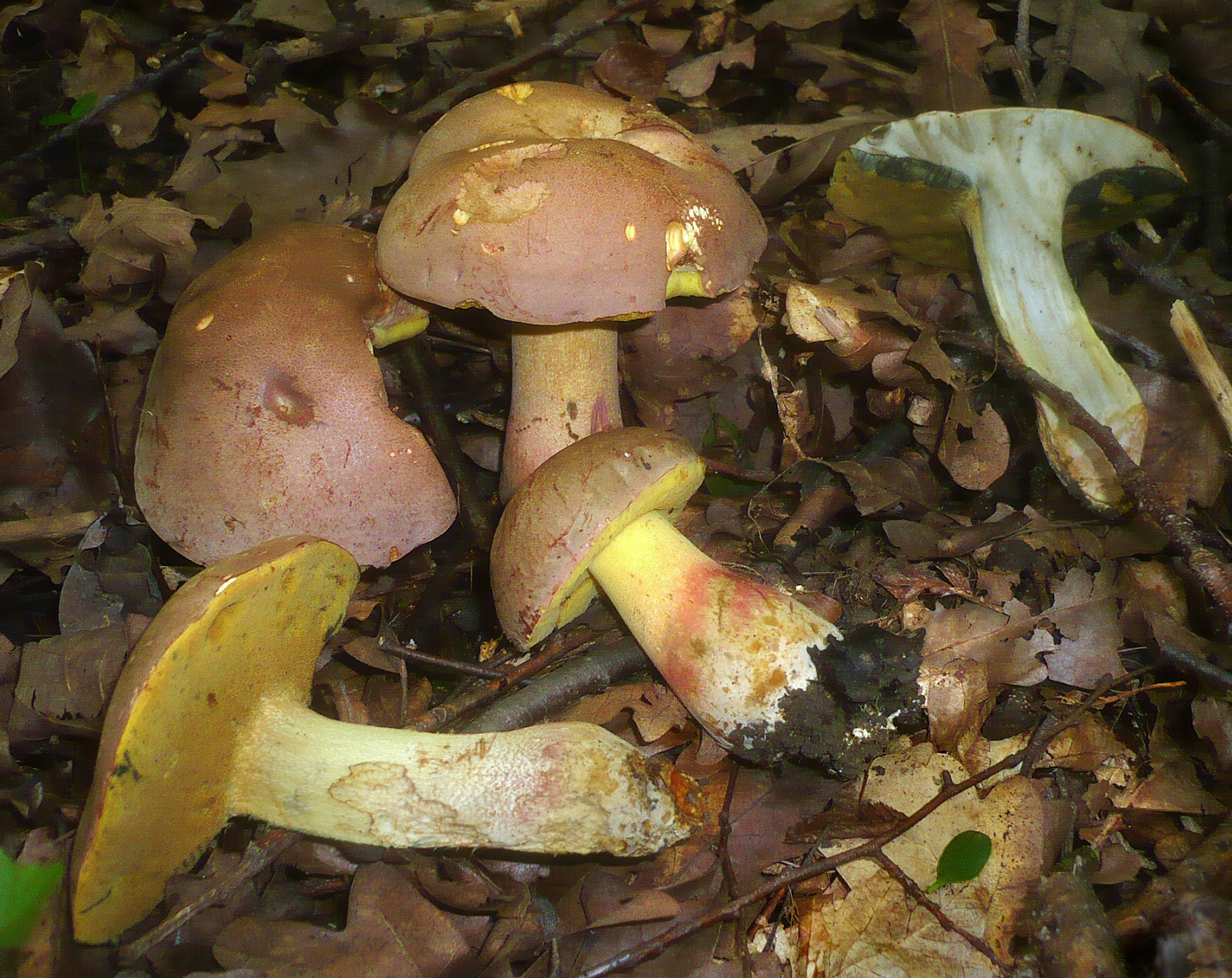

Scientific classification
- Kingdom: Fungi
- Division: Basidiomycota
- Class: Agaricomycetes
- Order: Boletales
- Family: Boletaceae
- Genus: Butyriboletus
- Species: B. fechtneri

Binomial name
- Butyriboletus fechtneri (Velen.) D.Arora & J.L.Frank (2014)

Synonyms
- Boletus fechtneri Velen. (1922)

= Butyriboletus fechtneri =

Species of fungus

Butyriboletus fechtneri is a basidiomycete fungus in the family Boletaceae. It was formerly regarded as a species of Boletus, but in 2014 was transferred to the newly erected genus Butyriboletus, after molecular data revealed that it is a member of the "Regius" clade (named after B. regius), quite distant from the core clade of B. edulis and closely allied species.

Butyriboletus fechtneri is native to Europe, where it forms ectomycorrhizal associations with various broad-leaved trees of the family Fagaceae, particularly oak (Quercus), beech (Fagus) and chestnut (Castanea). So far it has been molecularly confirmed from Austria, Bulgaria, Cyprus, Estonia, France, Spain and Sweden. It is considered an endangered species in the Czech Republic.

Recent molecular phylogenetic studies have shown regional populations of B. fechtneri to be highly variable genetically, suggesting they might be in the process of speciation.
