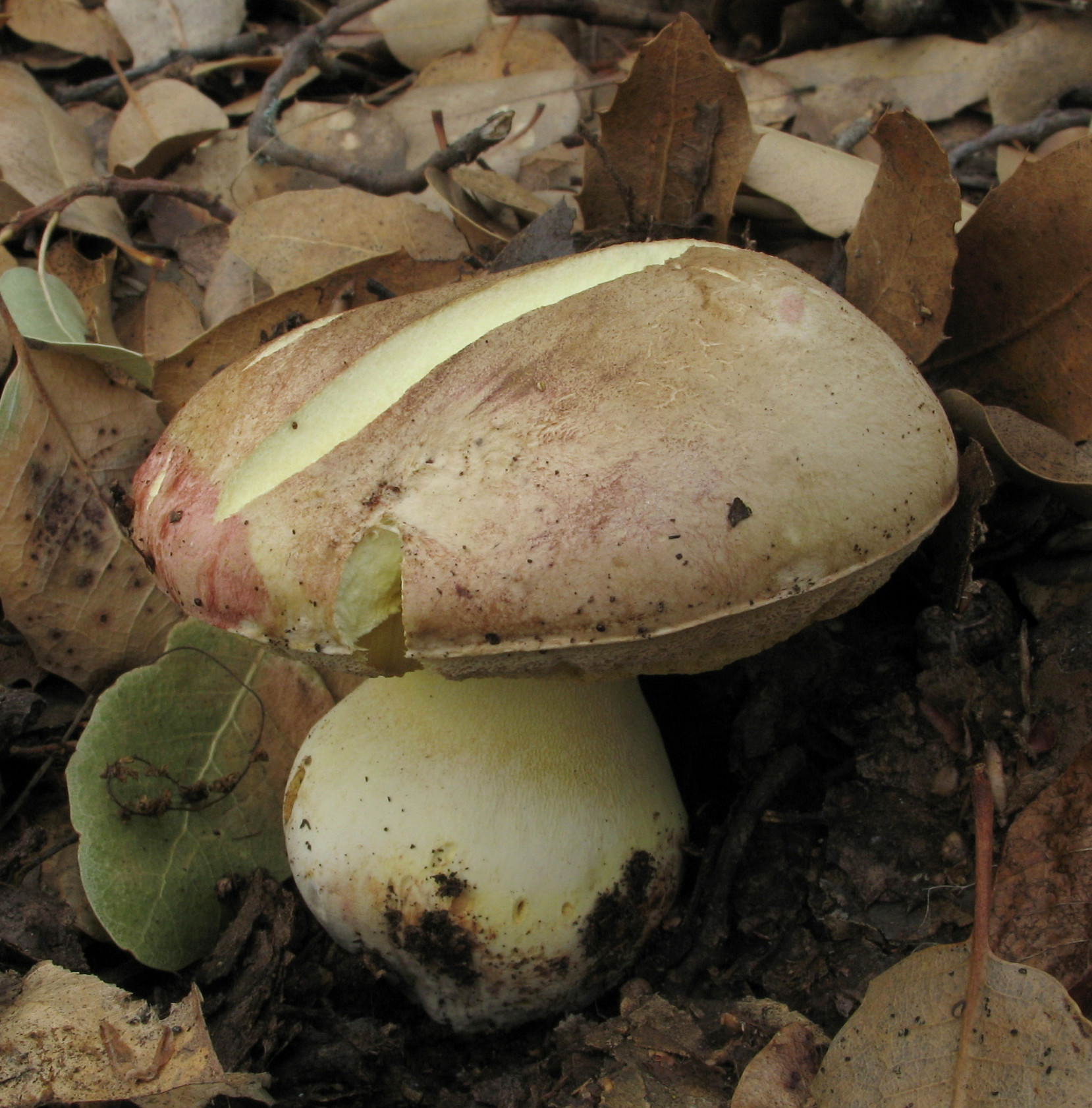

Scientific classification
- Domain: Eukaryota
- Kingdom: Fungi
- Division: Basidiomycota
- Class: Agaricomycetes
- Order: Boletales
- Family: Boletaceae
- Genus: Butyriboletus
- Species: B. querciregius

Binomial name
- Butyriboletus querciregius D.Arora & J.L.Frank (2014)

= Butyriboletus querciregius =

Species of fungus

Butyriboletus querciregius is a pored mushroom in the genus Butyriboletus. Found in California, where it grows in a mycorrhizal association with coast live oak (Quercus agrifolia), it was described as new to science in 2014.

== See also ==
- List of North American boletes
