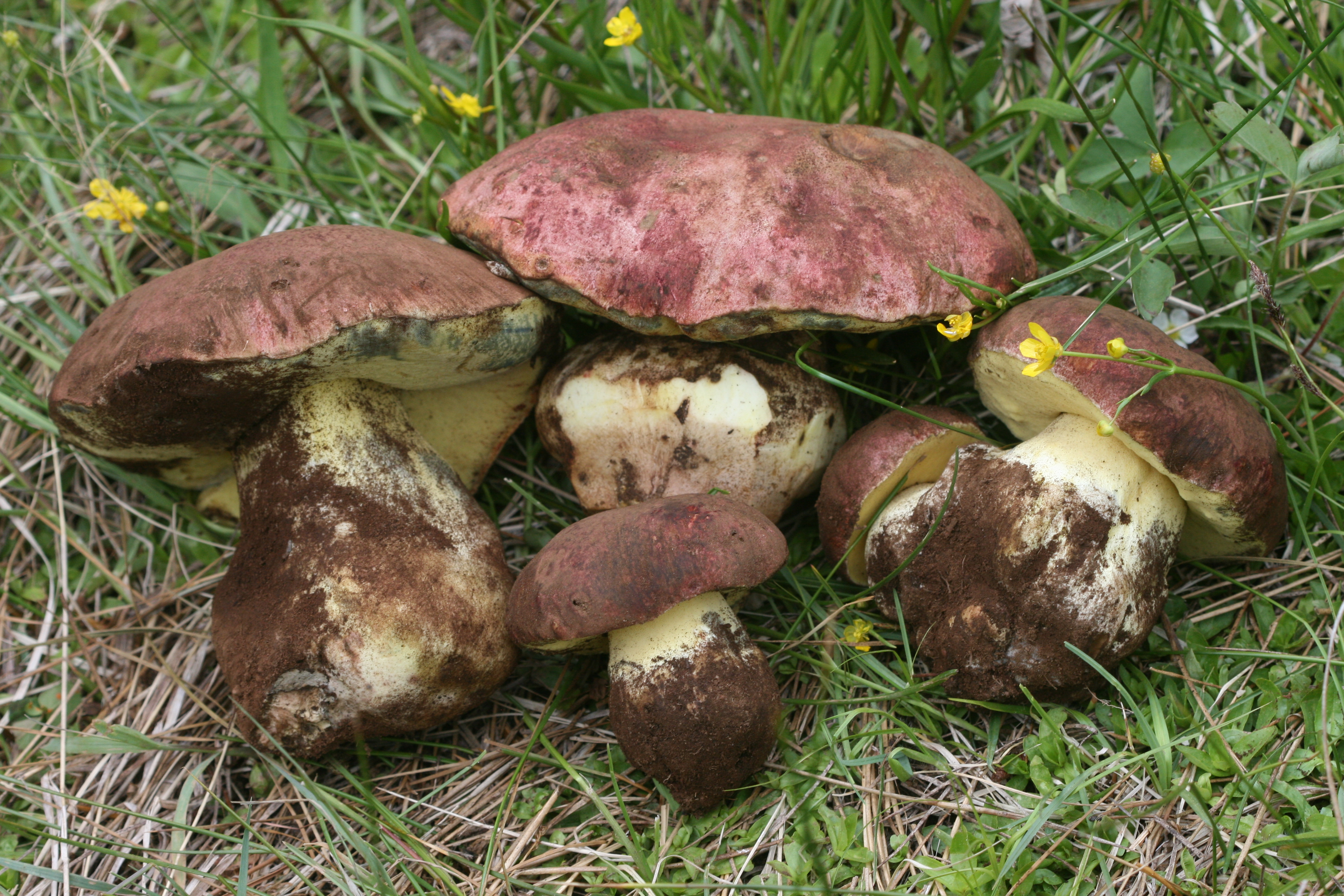

Scientific classification
- Domain: Eukaryota
- Kingdom: Fungi
- Division: Basidiomycota
- Class: Agaricomycetes
- Order: Boletales
- Family: Boletaceae
- Genus: Butyriboletus
- Species: B. primiregius

Binomial name
- Butyriboletus primiregius D.Arora & J.L.Frank (2014)

= Butyriboletus primiregius =

Species of fungus

Butyriboletus primiregius is a pored mushroom in the family Boletaceae. Found in California, where it grows in a mycorrhizal association with fir (genus Abies), it was described as new to science in 2014.

== See also ==
- List of North American boletes
