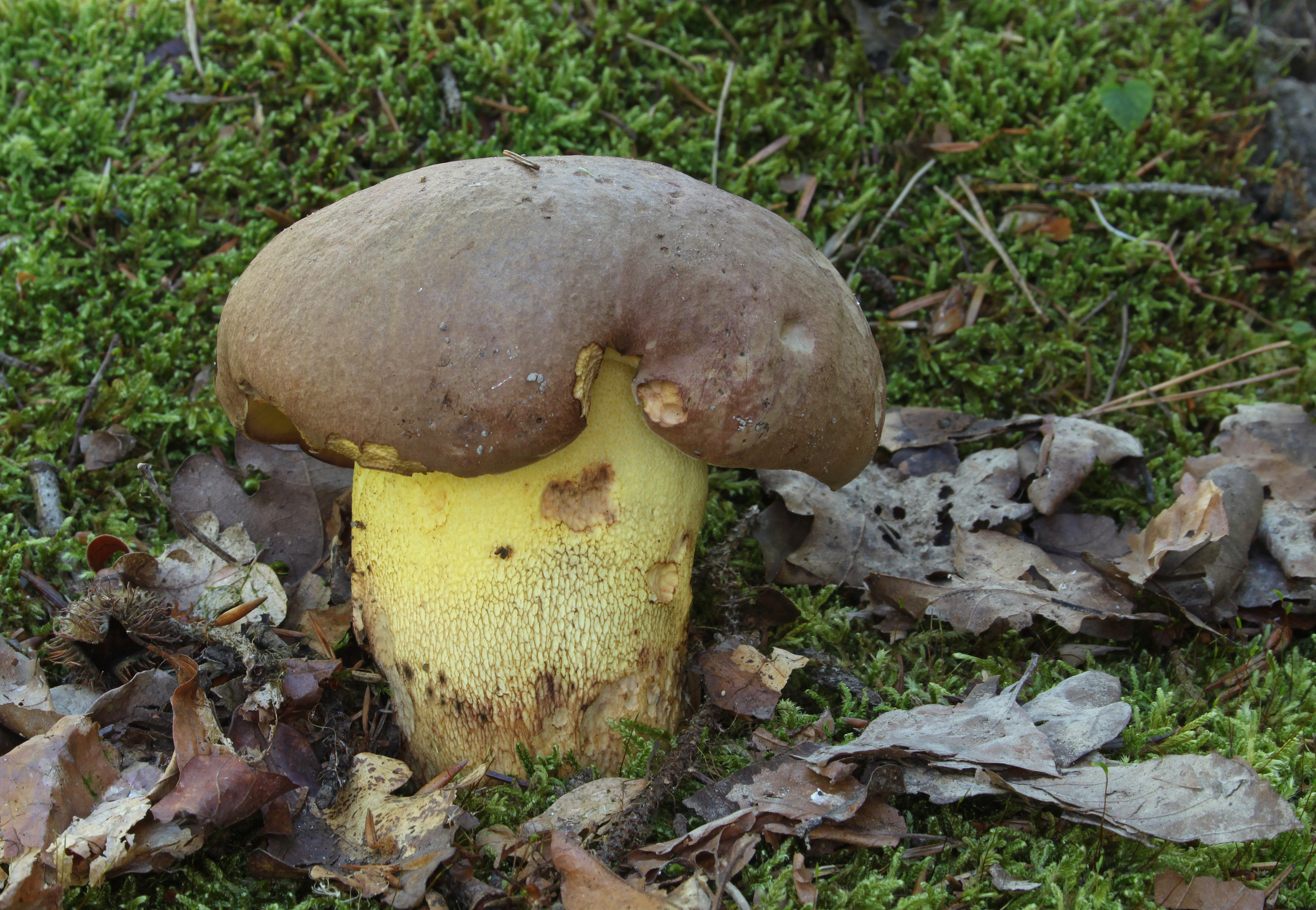
- Butyriboletus appendiculatus

Scientific classification
- Kingdom: Fungi
- Division: Basidiomycota
- Class: Agaricomycetes
- Order: Boletales
- Family: Boletaceae
- Genus: Butyriboletus; D.Arora & J.L.Frank (2014)

Type species
- Butyriboletus appendiculatus (Schaeffer) D.Arora & J.L.Frank (2014)

= Butyriboletus =

Genus of fungi

Butyriboletus is a genus of fungi in the family Boletaceae. The genus was circumscribed in 2014 by mycologists David Arora and Jonathan L. Frank to accommodate "butter bolete" species that were shown by molecular analysis to be phylogenetically distinct from Boletus. Butyriboletus contains 24 ectomycorrhizal species found in Asia, Europe, North America and north Africa.

The group had earlier been classified as the section Appendiculati within the large genus Boletus. They were given the common name "butter boletes" as the color of their stalk, flesh and pores was similar to that of butter. Genetic analysis published in 2013 shows that these species are part of a regius clade (named for B. regius), distinct from the core group of the type species B. edulis and relatives within the Boletineae. The narrowing of Boletus to this latter group meant that this group would need to be placed in a separate genus, with Boletus appendiculatus (now Butyriboletus appendiculatus) designated as the type species. The genus name itself is derived from the Latin butyrum "butter".

The butter boletes have red or brown caps, yellow pores and stipes that turn blue when cut or bruised in many species, and olive-brown spindle-shaped spores. Their flesh is usually mild tasting. Butyriboletus roseoflavus is a highly regarded edible mushroom sold in markets in southwestern and southeastern China, while two other species—B. yicibus and B. sanicibus—are eaten to a lesser degree in Yunnan Province.

== Species ==
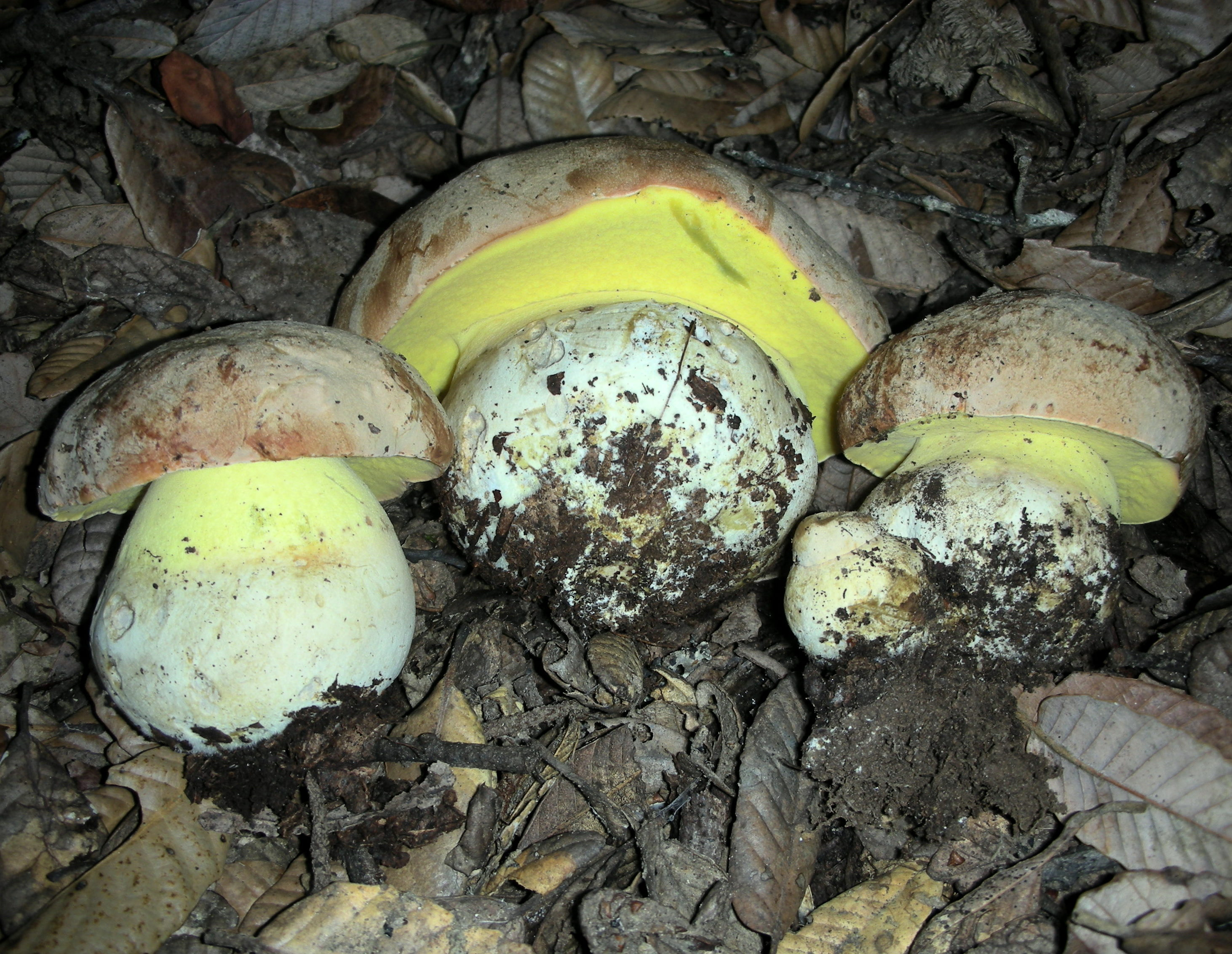
Butyriboletus persolidus

The following species are recognized, though more may yet be described from Japan, Mexico and China.

| Image | Name | Taxon Author | Year |
|---|---|---|---|
| | Butyriboletus abieticola | (Thiers) D. Arora & J.L. Frank | 2014 |
| | Butyriboletus appendiculatus | (Schaeff.) D. Arora & J.L. Frank | 2014 |
| | Butyriboletus autumniregius | D. Arora & J.L. Frank | 2014 |
| | Butyriboletus brunneus | (Peck) D. Arora & J.L. Frank | 2014 |
| | Butyriboletus cepaeodoratus | (Taneyama & Har. Takah.) Vizzini & Gelardi | 2014 |
| | Butyriboletus fechtneri | (Velen.) D. Arora & J.L. Frank | 2014 |
| | Butyriboletus fuscoroseus | (Smotl.) Vizzini & Gelardi | 2014 |
| | Butyriboletus hainanensis | N.K. Zeng, Zhi Q. Liang & Dong Y. An | 2016 |
| | Butyriboletus huangnianlaii | N.K. Zeng, H. Chai & Zhi Q. Liang | 2019 |
| | Butyriboletus loyo | (Phillippi) Mikšík | 2015 |
| | Butyriboletus parachinarensis | Naseer, Davoodian & Khalid | 2021 |
| | Butyriboletus peckii | (Frost) Kuan Zhao & Zhu L. Yang | 2015 |
| | Butyriboletus persolidus | D. Arora & J.L. Frank | 2014 |
| | Butyriboletus primiregius | D. Arora & J.L. Frank | 2014 |
| | Butyriboletus pseudoregius | (Heinr. Huber) D. Arora & J.L. Frank | 2014 |
| | Butyriboletus pseudospeciosus | Kuan Zhao & Zhu L. Yang | 2016 |
| | Butyriboletus pulchriceps | (Both, Bessette & R. Chapm.) Kuan Zhao & Zhu L. Yang | 2015 |
| | Butyriboletus querciregius | D. Arora & J.L. Frank | 2014 |
| | Butyriboletus regius | (Krombh.) D. Arora & J.L. Frank | 2014 |
| | Butyriboletus roseoflavus | (Hai B. Li & Hai L. Wei) D. Arora & J.L. Frank | 2014 |
| | Butyriboletus roseogriseus | (Šutara, M. Graca, M. Kolařík, Janda & Kříž) Vizzini & Gelardi | 2014 |
| | Butyriboletus roseopurpureus | (Both, Bessette & Roody) Kuan Zhao, G. Wu, Halling & Zhu L. Yang | 2015 |
| | Butyriboletus sanicibus | D. Arora & J.L. Frank | 2014 |
| | Butyriboletus subappendiculatus | (Dermek, Lazebn. & J. Veselský) D. Arora & J.L. Frank | 2014 |
| | Butyriboletus subsplendidus | (W.F. Chiu) Kuan Zhao, G. Wu & Zhu L. Yang | 2016 |
| | Butyriboletus taughannockensis | I. Safonov | 2017 |
| | Butyriboletus ventricosus | (Taneyama & Har. Takah.) Vizzini & Gelardi | 2014 |
| | Butyriboletus yicibus | D. Arora & J.L. Frank | 2014 |
