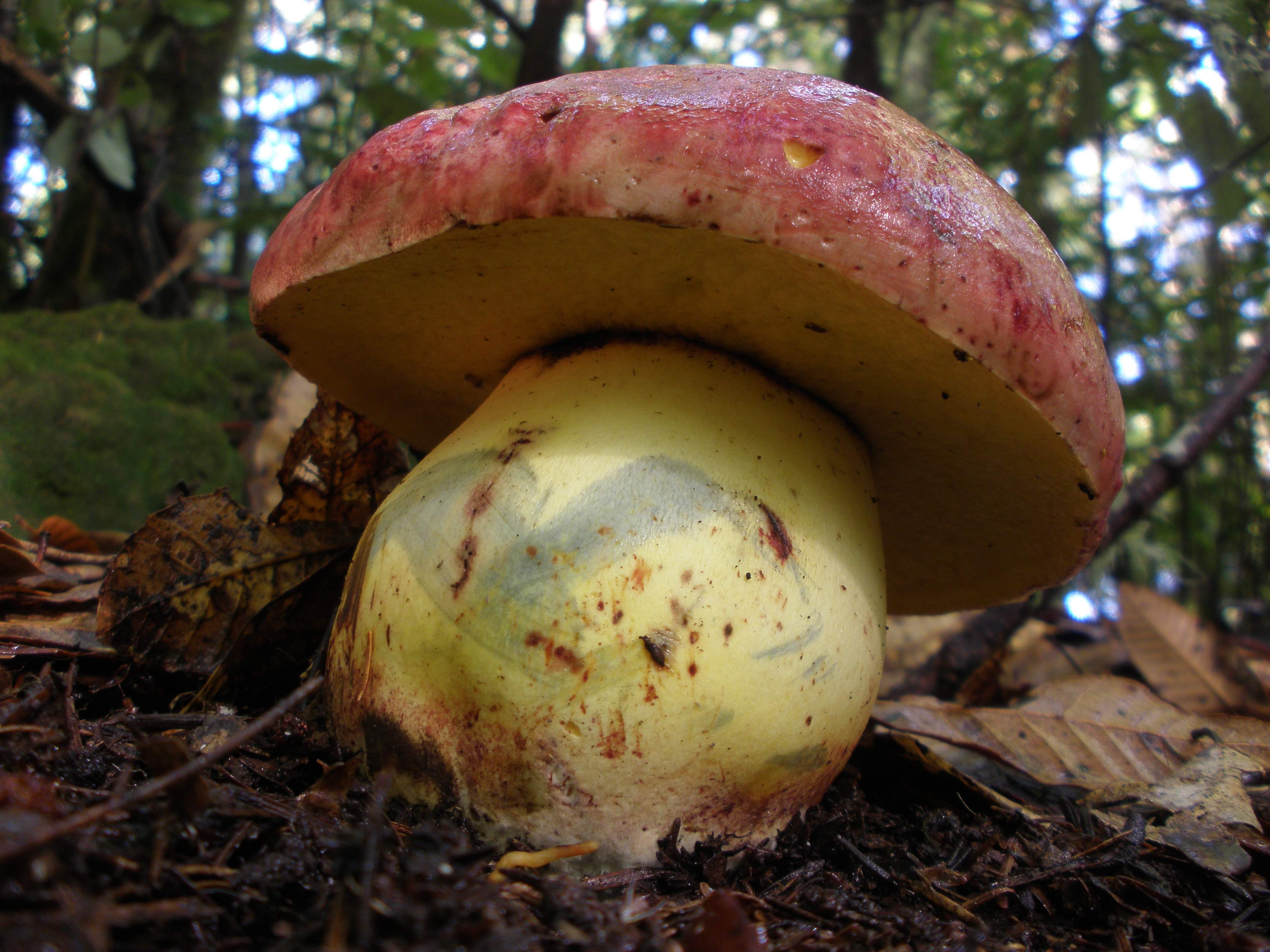

Scientific classification
- Domain: Eukaryota
- Kingdom: Fungi
- Division: Basidiomycota
- Class: Agaricomycetes
- Order: Boletales
- Family: Boletaceae
- Genus: Butyriboletus
- Species: B. autumniregius

Binomial name
- Butyriboletus autumniregius D.Arora & J.L.Frank (2014)

= Butyriboletus autumniregius =

Species of fungus

Butyriboletus autumniregius, also known as the rosy autumn butter bolete, is a pored mushroom in the family Boletaceae. It is found in California and southern Oregon, where it fruits under Douglas fir and redwood.

== See also ==
- List of North American boletes
