= Austrogaster =

Scientific classification
- Kingdom: Fungi
- Division: Basidiomycota
- Class: Agaricomycetes
- Order: Boletales
- Family: Paxillaceae
- Genus: Austrogaster; Singer (1962)

Type species
- Austrogaster marthae Singer (1962)

Species
- A. baeospermum A. marthae A. novae-zelandiae

Genus of fungi

Austrogaster is a genus of fungi in the family Paxillaceae. The genus contains three species found in temperate South America, and New Zealand. The genus was circumscribed by Rolf Singer in 1962.
