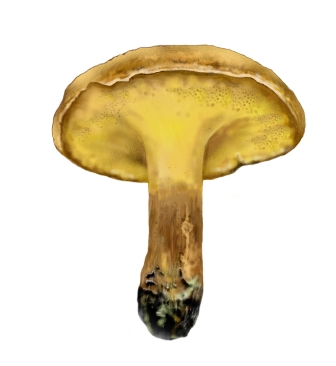
- Gyrodon lividus

Scientific classification
- Kingdom: Fungi
- Division: Basidiomycota
- Class: Agaricomycetes
- Order: Boletales
- Family: Paxillaceae
- Genus: Gyrodon; Opat. (1836)

Type species
- Gyrodon sistotremoides Opat. (1836)

Synonyms
- Anastomaria Rafinesque (1820); Uloporus Quél. (1886); Campbellia Cooke & Massee (1890); Rodwaya Syd. & P.Syd. (1901); Plicaturella Murrill (1910); Gilbertiella R.Heim (1965); Gilbertina R.Heim (1966); Pseudogyrodon Heinem. & Rammeloo (1983)

= Gyrodon =

Genus of fungi

Gyrodon is a genus of pored mushroom bearing close affinity to the genus Paxillus. Recent molecular research has confirmed this relationship of the two genera as sister taxa, together diverging as one of the most basal lineages in the Boletineae, and sister to the Boletaceae.

Gyrodon was circumscribed by German botanist Wilhelm Opatowski in 1836.

== Species ==
As of September 2015, Index Fungorum lists 13 species of Gyrodon.

- Gyrodon adisianus — Brazil
- Gyrodon africanus
- Gyrodon bohemicus
- Gyrodon crassipes — Ethiopia
- Gyrodon cupreus
- Gyrodon housei
- Gyrodon intermedius — Africa, Madagascar
- Gyrodon lividus — Type species, Europe
- Gyrodon minutus — Asia
- Gyrodon miretipes — Burundi
- Gyrodon ripicola
- Gyrodon smotlachae
- Gyrodon rubellus
- Gyrodon tennesseensis — USA

== See also ==
- Boletinellus merulioides
