= Francova Lhota =

- Municipality
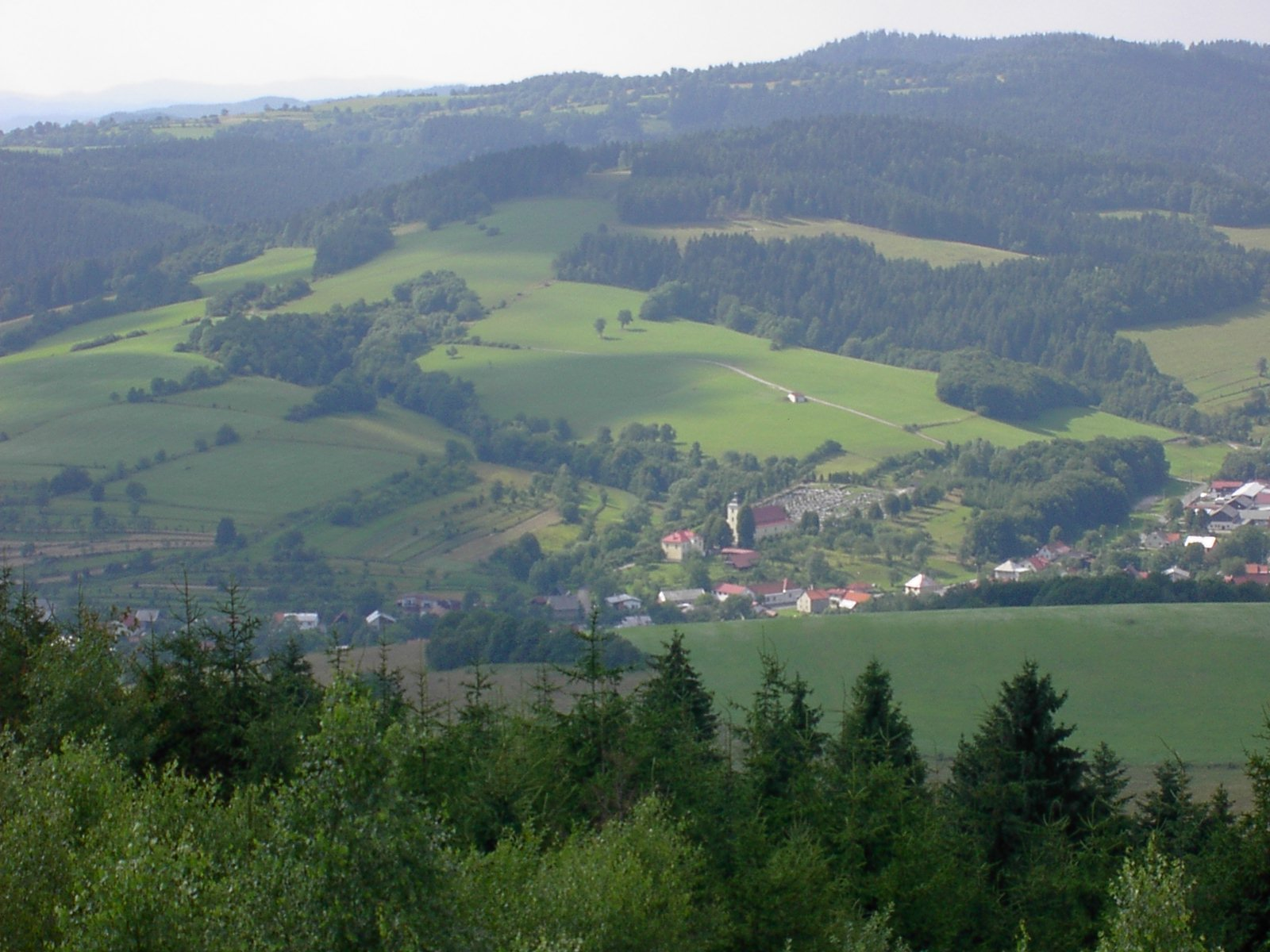
- View of Francova Lhota

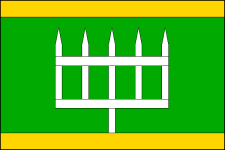
- Flag Coat of arms

- Location in the Czech Republic
- Coordinates: 49°12′6″N 18°6′42″E
- Country: Czech Republic
- Region: Zlín
- District: Vsetín
- First mentioned: 1500

Area
  - Total: 22.88 km^{2} (8.83 sq mi)
- Elevation: 490 m (1,610 ft)

Population (2026-01-01)
  - Total: 1,463
  - Density: 63.94/km^{2} (165.6/sq mi)
- Time zone: UTC+1 (CET)
  - Summer (DST): UTC+2 (CEST)
- Postal codes: 756 12, 756 14
- Website: francovalhota.cz

Francova Lhota (German: Franzenschlag) is a municipality and village in Vsetín District in the Zlín Region of the Czech Republic. It has about 1,500 inhabitants. It lies on the border with Slovakia.

== Administrative division ==
Francova Lhota consists of two municipal parts (in brackets population according to the 2021 census):

- Francova Lhota (1,350)
- Pulčín (72)

== Demographics ==
Historical population
Year	Pop.	±%
1869	1,363	—
1880	1,395	+2.3%
1890	1,443	+3.4%
1900	1,504	+4.2%
1910	1,519	+1.0%
1921	1,620	+6.6%
1930	1,593	−1.7%
1950	1,345	−15.6%
1961	1,668	+24.0%
1970	1,666	−0.1%
1980	1,578	−5.3%
1991	1,632	+3.4%
2001	1,635	+0.2%
2011	1,560	−4.6%
2021	1,422	−8.8%
Source: Censuses

== Notable people ==
- Štěpán Trochta (1905–1974), Roman Catholic prelate
