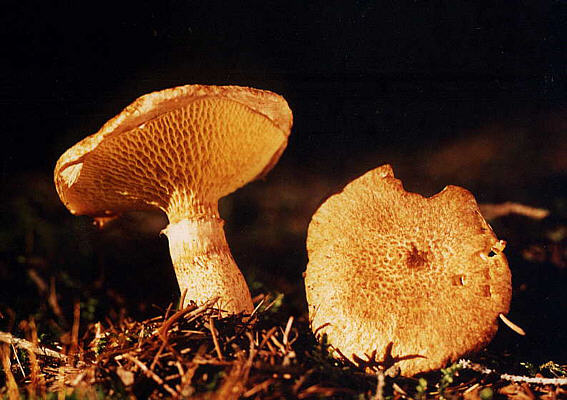
- Boletinus cavipes yellow variety

Scientific classification
- Kingdom: Fungi
- Division: Basidiomycota
- Class: Agaricomycetes
- Order: Boletales
- Family: Suillaceae
- Genus: Boletinus; Kalchbr.

= Boletinus =

Genus of fungi

Boletinus is a genus of fungi belonging to the family Suillaceae.

The genus was first described by Károly Kalchbrenner in 1867.

The genus has cosmopolitan distribution.

Species:

- Boletinus cavipes Kalchbr.
