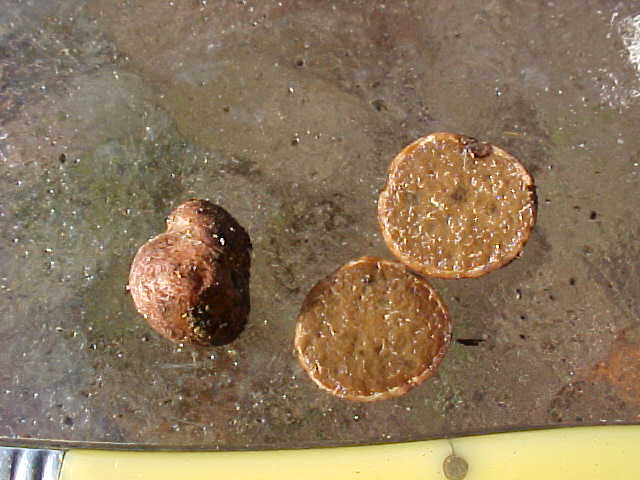
- Alpova diplophloeus

Scientific classification
- Kingdom: Fungi
- Division: Basidiomycota
- Class: Agaricomycetes
- Order: Boletales
- Family: Paxillaceae
- Genus: Alpova; C.W.Dodge (1931)

Type species
- Alpova cinnamomeus C.W.Dodge (1931)

= Alpova =

Genus of fungi

Alpova is a genus of fungi in the family Paxillaceae. It contains about 20 species of ectomycorrhizal false-truffles that collectively have a widespread distribution, especially in northern temperate areas. The genus was circumscribed by Carroll William Dodge in 1931.

== Species ==
- Alpova alpestris
- Alpova austroalnicola
- Alpova cinnamomeus
- Alpova clelandii
- Alpova cinnamomeus
- Alpova concolor
- Alpova corsicus
- Alpova diplophloeus
- Alpova klikae
- Alpova komoviana
- Alpova microsporus
- Alpova mollis
- Alpova nauseosus
- Alpova olivaceoniger
- Alpova olivaceotinctus
- Alpova pachyphloeus
- Alpova piceus
- Alpova pseudostipitatus
- Alpova rubescens
- Alpova shanxiensis
- Alpova superdubius
- Alpova trappei
- Alpova yangchengensis
