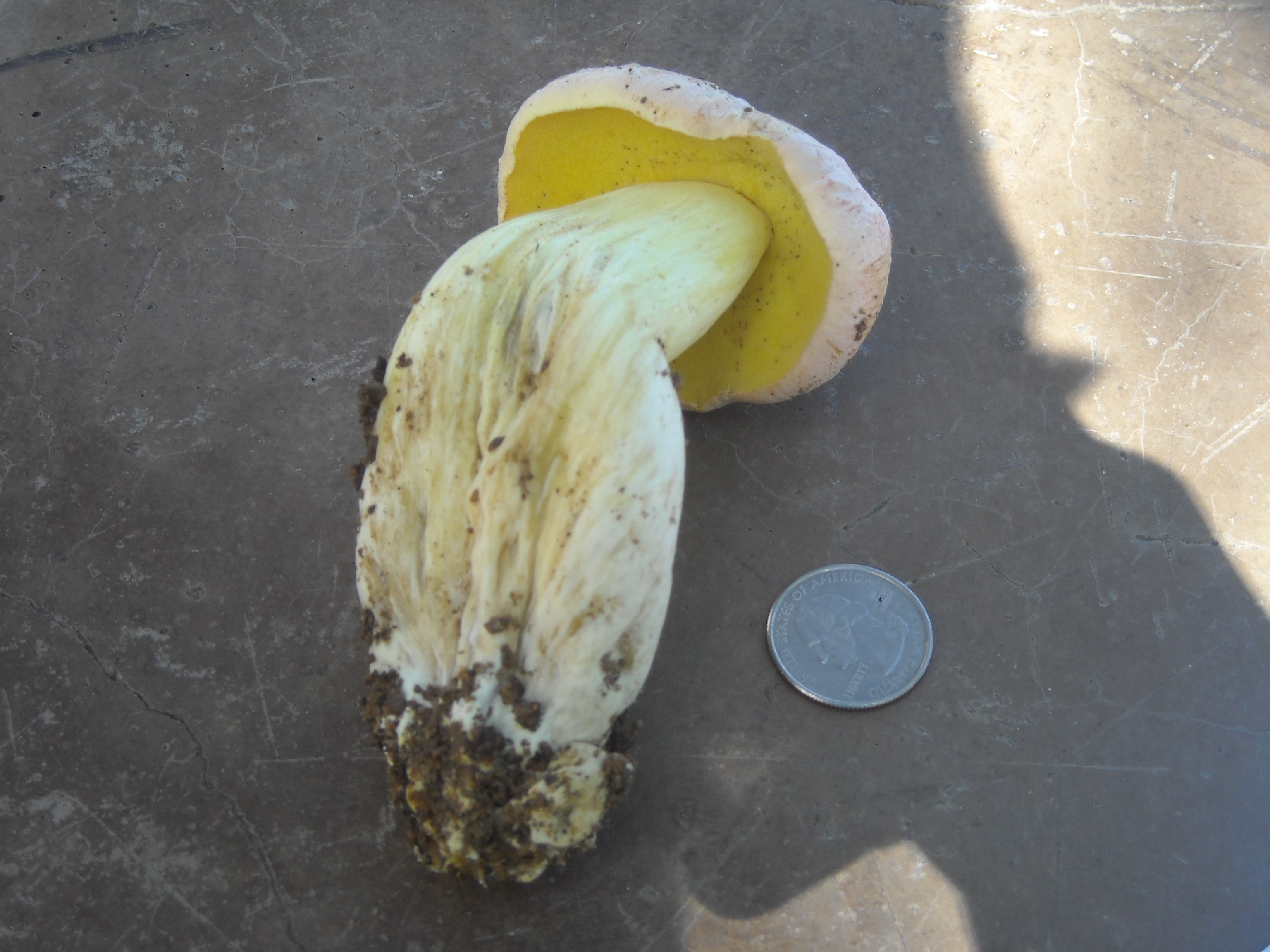

Scientific classification
- Domain: Eukaryota
- Kingdom: Fungi
- Division: Basidiomycota
- Class: Agaricomycetes
- Order: Boletales
- Family: Boletaceae
- Genus: Butyriboletus
- Species: B. pulchriceps

Binomial name
- Butyriboletus pulchriceps (Both, Bessette & R.Chapm.) Kuan Zhao & Zhu L.Yang (2015)

Synonyms
- Boletus pulchriceps Both, Bessette & R.Chapm. (2000)

= Butyriboletus pulchriceps =

Species of fungus

Butyriboletus pulchriceps is a fungus of the family Boletaceae native to North America. It was first formally described in 2000, as a member of the genus Boletus, and transferred to Butyriboletus in 2015.

== See also ==
- List of North American boletes
