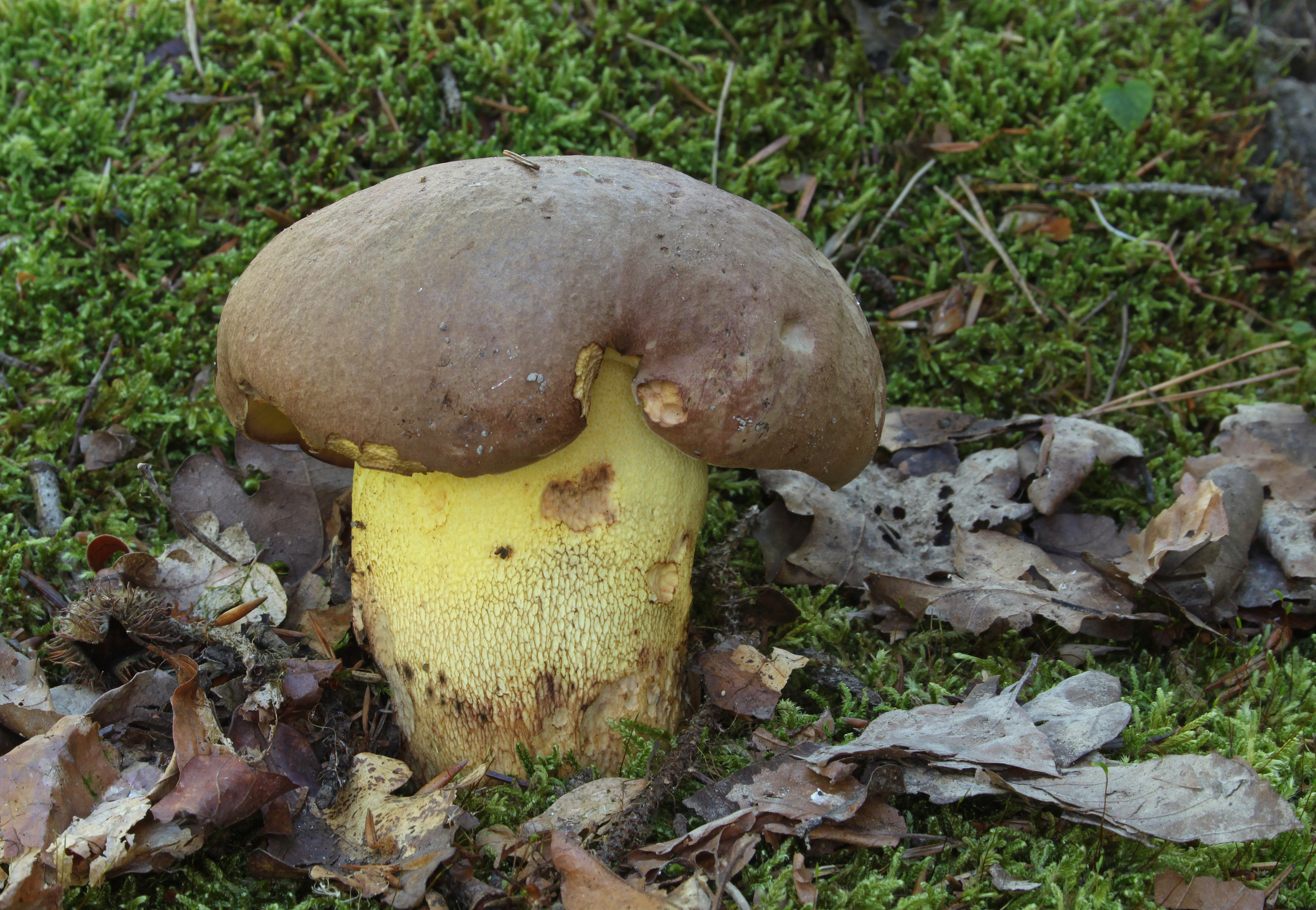

Scientific classification
- Kingdom: Fungi
- Division: Basidiomycota
- Class: Agaricomycetes
- Order: Boletales
- Family: Boletaceae
- Genus: Butyriboletus
- Species: B. appendiculatus

Binomial name
- Butyriboletus appendiculatus (Schaeff.) D.Arora & J.L. Frank (2014)

Synonyms
- Boletus appendiculatus Schaeff. (1774)

= Butyriboletus appendiculatus =

Species of fungus

Butyriboletus appendiculatus Mycological characteristics
- Pores on hymenium
- Cap is convex
- Hymenium is adnate
- Stipe is bare
- Spore print is olive-brown
- Ecology is mycorrhizal
- Edibility is choice

Butyriboletus appendiculatus is an edible pored mushroom that grows under oaks and other broad leaved trees such as beech. It is commonly known as the butter bolete. It often grows in large colonies beneath the oak trees, and is frequently found cohabiting with old oaks in ancient woodland. It is relatively rare in Britain. Its stipe and pores are often bright yellow (hence its name of butter bolete) and its flesh stains bright blue when cut or bruised.

== Taxonomy ==
The species was first described scientifically by German polymath Jacob Christian Schäffer in 1774 as Boletus appendiculatus. American Charles Horton Peck later used the name in 1896 for a species he found in Washington, but the name was illegitimate because Schäffer's earlier usage has priority. Until 2014, it was classified in the genus Boletus. Molecular phylogenetic analysis demonstrated that it and other members of Boletus section Appendiculati were phylogenetically distinct from Boletus, and the genus Butyriboletus was created to contain them.

The specific epithet appendiculatus means "with a small appendage".

== Description ==
The fruit bodies of Butyriboletus appendiculatus have convex to flattened, brown to yellowish brown caps measuring 6–20 cm (2.4–7.9 in) in diameter. They have a dry to slightly sticky surface texture that may develop cracks with age. The mushroom has very firm yellowish flesh that may slowly change blue when cut or bruised. The pores on the cap undersurface are butter yellow, and may also bruise blue, although this is less likely in young specimens. The stipe is 5–15 cm (2–6 in) long by 2–6 cm (0.8–2.4 in) thick at the top near the attachment to the cap, and ranges from thicker at the base to equal throughout, to tapered at the bottom. It is also yellow, sometimes developing brownish to reddish stains, and may have fine reticulations near the top. The spore print is dark olive-brown. Individual spores are ellipsoidal to spindle-shaped, smooth, and measure 12–15 by 3.5–5 μm.

=== Similar species ===
The European species Butyriboletus subappendiculatus is quite similar to B. appendiculatus in microscopic characters. It can be distinguished in the field by the lack of a bruising color reaction, more pallid cap colors, and growth under conifers. Also similar are Butyriboletus regius and Boletus edulis.

== Distribution and habitat ==
Butyriboletus appendiculatus is found in Europe and North America. Fruit bodies grow singly, scattered, or in groups under hardwood trees. In North America, it is more common in the Pacific Northwest region, where it often associates with live oak and tanoak.

== Edibility ==
The bolete is edible and considered choice by several sources, although certain individuals may have an allergic reaction to it. The earthy flavor of the mushrooms make them suitable for soups, sauces and stews. Cooked portions will often turn blue, then gray, then return to their original yellow color.

== See also ==
- List of Boletus species
- List of North American boletes
