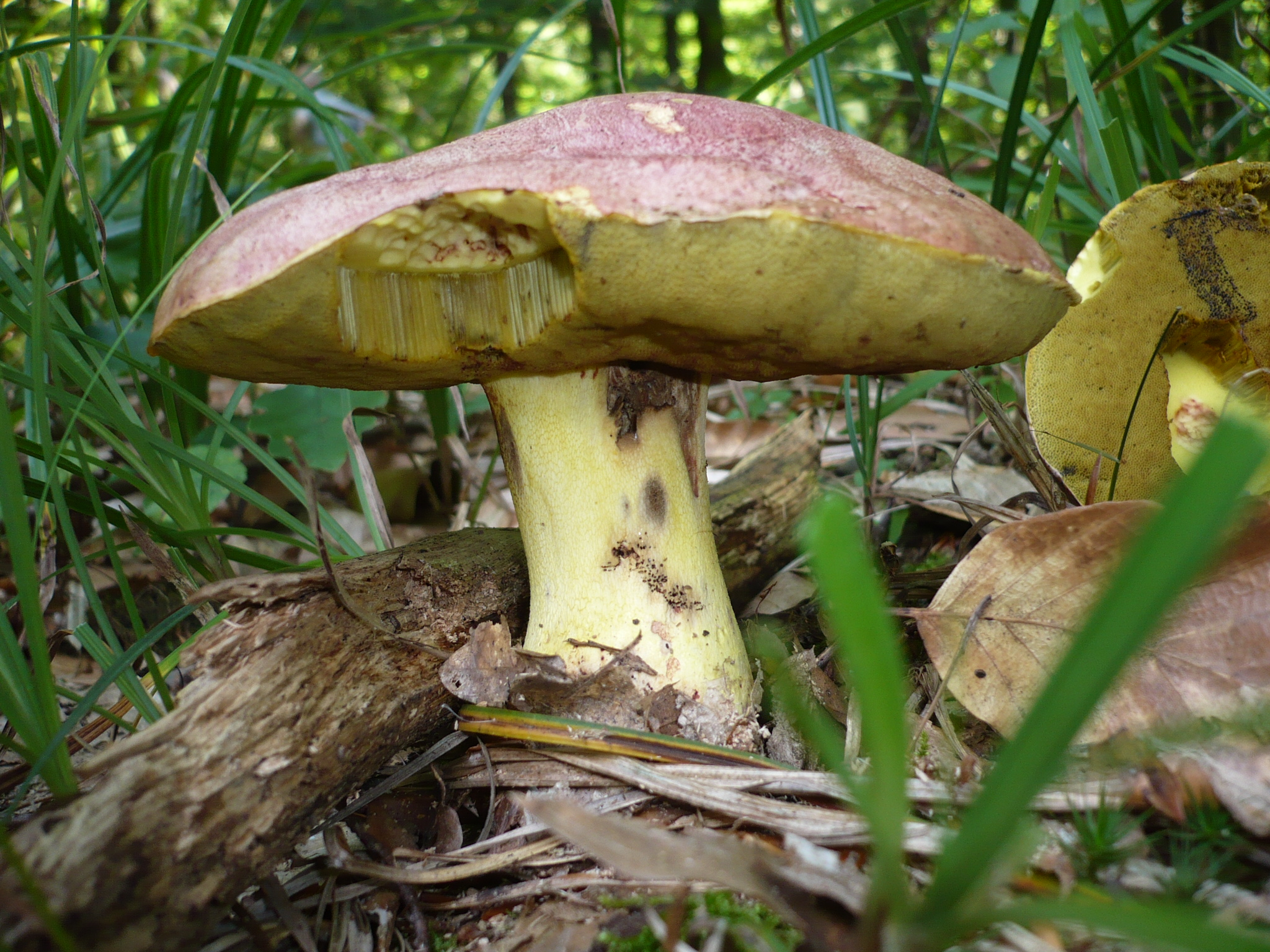
- Butyriboletus regius in Austria

Scientific classification
- Domain: Eukaryota
- Kingdom: Fungi
- Division: Basidiomycota
- Class: Agaricomycetes
- Order: Boletales
- Family: Boletaceae
- Genus: Butyriboletus
- Species: B. regius

Binomial name
- Butyriboletus regius (Krombh.) D.Arora & J.L.Frank (2014)

Synonyms
- Boletus regius Krombh. (1832); Boletus appendiculatus var. regius Konr.; Boletus subtomentosus ssp. cerasinus Martin

= Butyriboletus regius =

Species of fungus

Butyriboletus regius Mycological characteristics
- Pores on hymenium
- Cap is convex
- Hymenium is adnexed
- Stipe is bare
- Spore print is olive-brown
- Ecology is mycorrhizal
- Edibility is choice

Butyriboletus regius (formerly Boletus regius), commonly known as the royal bolete or red-capped butter bolete, is a basidiomycete species of fungus in the genus Butyriboletus. It has a pink cap, yellow flesh, and a reticulate pattern on the stem.

The mushroom is found in North America, Europe, and China. North America specimens stain blue when exposed to air, but European specimens do not, or only stain weakly. Both are edible and considered choice.

== Taxonomy ==
The species was first described and illustrated by Julius Vincenz von Krombholz in 1832. Common names for the mushroom include the red-capped butter bolete and the royal bolete.

Butyriboletus regius was formerly classified as a member of the section Appendiculati of the genus Boletus. Molecular analysis demonstrated that this and related "butter bolete" species, including Boletus appendiculatus, are phylogenetically distinct from Boletus, and the new genus Butyriboletus was created to contain them.

Harry D. Thiers described a similar mushroom from California as B. regius, though it is not the same species.

== Description ==
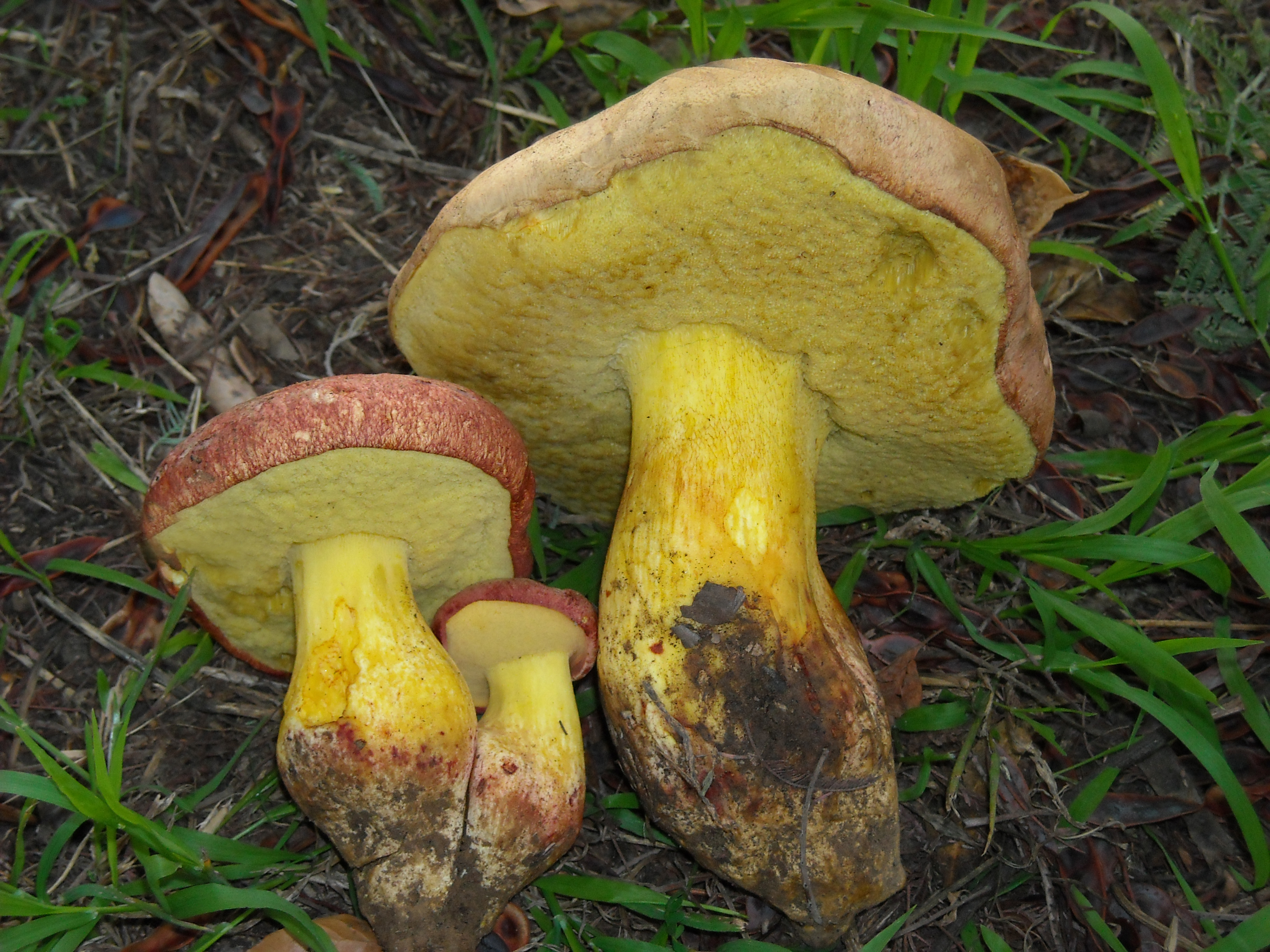
Boletus regius sensu Thiers, collected in California

The caps are convex or flat, reaching a diameter of 6–20 cm (2 1/4–7 3/4 in) wide. The cap surface is pink to red, occasionally with hints of yellow or brown, more so around the margin. Initially velvety to slightly tomentose (hairy) when young, these minute hairs tend to slough off with age, and the cap develops wrinkles and pits. The cap flesh is yellow, usually slowly and erratically bruising blue in North American specimens. In Europe, it does not stain when exposed to air or stains weakly.

The pores on the underside of the cap are angular and measure about 1–2 per millimetre. The color of the pore surface is bright yellow to start, but eventually darkens somewhat, and will stain blue with damage. The depth of the tubes comprising the pores extends to 0.8–2.5 cm (1/4–1 in).

The stem measures 5–14 cm (2–5 1/2 in) long and 2.5–6 cm (1–2 1/4 in) thick, typically with a thick, bulbous base. It is solid (i.e., not hollow), and a bright yellow color, often with reddish tones, particularly near the base of the stem. The stem surface can be covered with fine yellow reticulations either throughout its length, or just on the upper portion. The spore print is olive-brown. The smooth, hyaline (translucent) spores are roughly elliptical to somewhat fusoid (wider in the middle and tapering toward the ends) to more or less cylindrical, and have dimensions of 12–17 by 4–5 μm.

Chemical tests can be used to help identify B. regius in the field. The cap cuticle will stain a pale purple color if FeSO_{4} is applied; this same test will turn the flesh grayish.

== Habitat and distribution ==
Butyriboletus regius is an ectomycorrhizal species with a broad host range, associating with oak and conifers, especially fir. The fruit bodies grow singly, scattered, or grouped together. In North America, they usually appear from August to November, although they also appear between May and June. The North American distribution includes the Pacific Northwest states of California, Oregon, and Washington, where its frequency of occurrence ranges from "rare to locally abundant". It is rare in Europe, appearing on the Regional Red List of several countries and being considered endangered in the Czech Republic. The species has also been recorded from China.

== Uses ==
Both European and California species are considered choice edibles, but the latter can be maggot-infested.

== See also ==
- List of North American boletes
