= Silver fir =

Silver fir is a common name for multiple trees and may refer to:

- Abies alba, native to Europe
- Abies amabilis, native to western North America
- Abies pindrow, native to Asia
