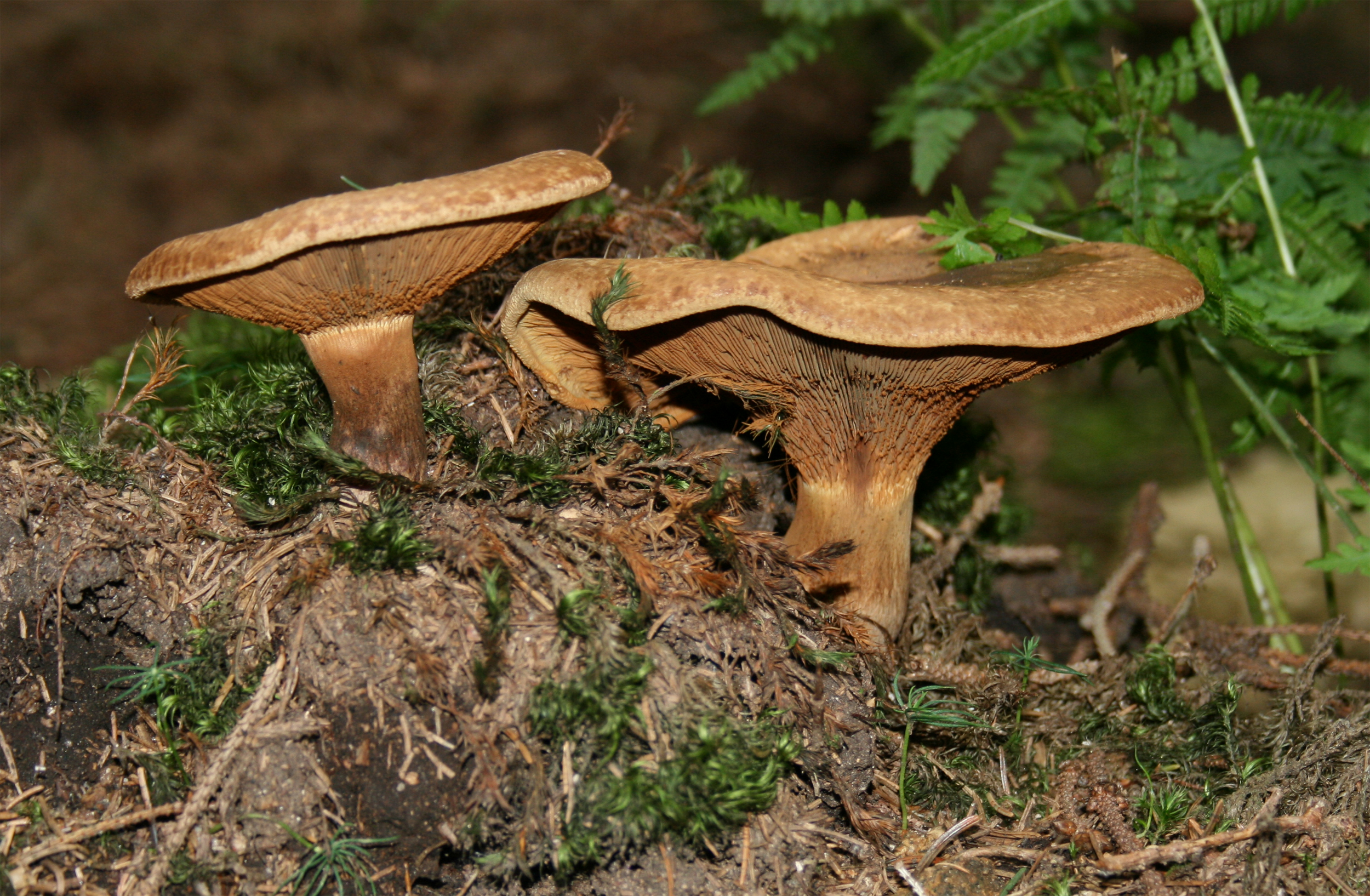
- Paxillus involutus

Scientific classification
- Kingdom: Fungi
- Division: Basidiomycota
- Class: Agaricomycetes
- Order: Boletales
- Family: Paxillaceae; Lotsy (1907)

Type species
- Paxillus Fr. (1835)

Genera
- Alpova; Austrogaster; Gyrodon; Hydnomerulius; Meiorganum; Melanogaster; Paragyrodon; Paxillus

Synonyms
- Gyrodontaceae (Singer) Heinem. (1951)

= Paxillaceae =

Family of fungi

The Paxillaceae are a family of mushroom-forming fungi bearing close affinity to the boletes. Collectively, the family contains nine genera and 78 species. The type genus is Paxillus, containing fungi with decurrent gills, and Gyrodon, which has members with decurrent pores, among others. French mycologist René Maire had erected the family in 1902, placing it between the agarics and boletes and recognizing the groups' similarities with the latter group. Maire's usage of the name was later deemed to be invalid, and the genus authority is attributed to Johannes Paulus Lotsy. Molecular research confirms the relations of Gyrodon, with the decurrent-pored mushroom G. lividus, Paragyrodon, with the type species P. sphaerosporus, and Paxillus as sister groups, together lying near the base of a phylogenetic tree from which the genus Boletus arises. The name Gyrodontaceae, published by Belgian botanist Paul Heinemann in 1951, is considered synonymous with Paxillaceae.
