= Hallucinogenic bolete mushroom =

Type of psychoactive fungus

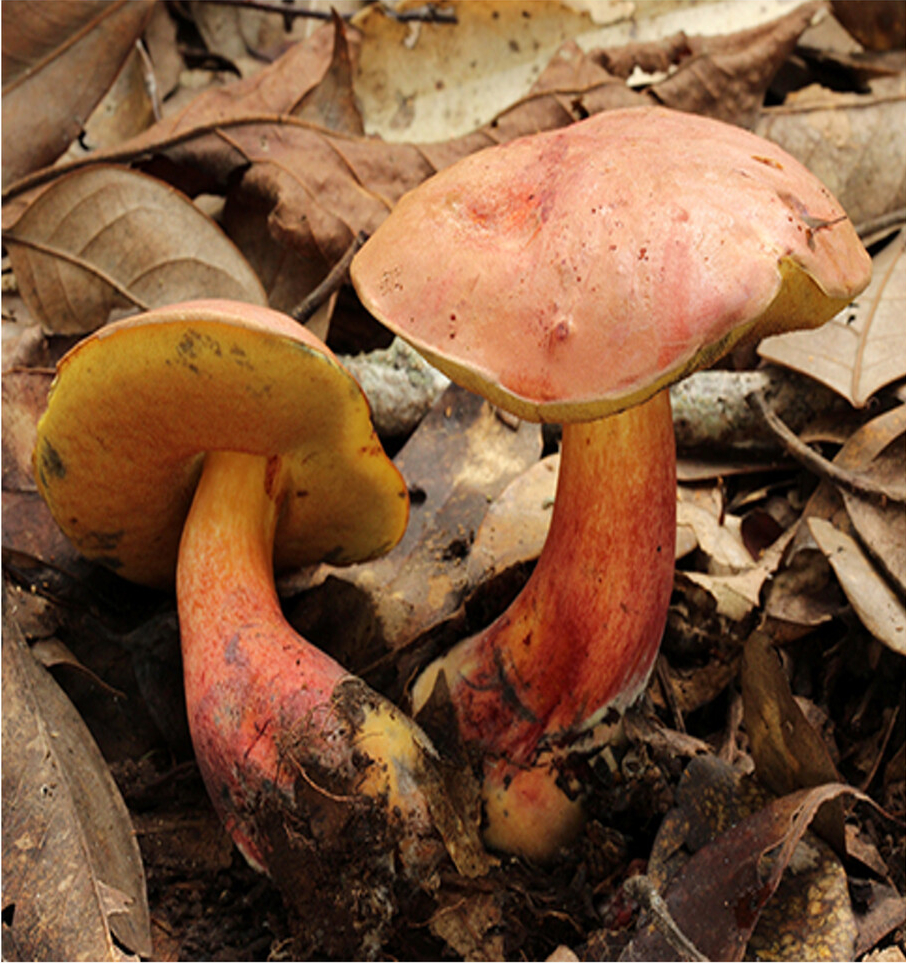
Lanmaoa asiatica (above), is the species that has been the most implicated as a hallucinogenic bolete mushroom.

Hallucinogenic bolete mushrooms, often referred to in English as xiao ren ren mushrooms (derived from Chinese: 小人人; pinyin: Xiǎorénrén; lit. 'little people'), are bolete mushrooms that are otherwise considered delicacies but produce hallucinogenic effects and gastrointestinal upset if eaten raw or undercooked. They have been reported in China, the Philippines, and Papua New Guinea.

The exact species of the mushrooms, their active constituents, and their mechanism of action have all yet to be fully clarified. However, among the most frequently implicated species is Lanmaoa asiatica, a species first described in 2015. Intoxication with these types of mushrooms is said to make people see the "xiao ren ren" (which are known to science as "Lilliputian hallucinations"). Lilliputian hallucinations are a unique type of hallucination and are not necessarily consistent with the hallucinogenic effects of known psychoactive mushrooms.

Other much more well-known hallucinogenic mushrooms include psilocybin-containing mushrooms (which contain the serotonin 5-HT_{2A} receptor agonist psilocybin) and Amanita muscaria mushrooms (which contain the GABA_{A} receptor agonist muscimol).

Lanmaoa asiatica is being studied by the American scientists Colin Domnauer and Bryn Dentinger who currently are performing animal studies of mushroom extracts while also working towards identifying the active constituents. Further research progress has been made in mid-2026.

== Taxonomy ==
The taxonomic assignment of hallucinogenic bolete mushrooms has undergone major revisions as some Asian species were originally mistaken as other (mainly European) species until a closer examination was done. For example, the most frequently implicated species known as Lanmaoa asiatica was not described until 2015 when the genus Lanmaoa was created; before then it was treated as Boletus clade 49 in Wu et al., 2014.

A mushroom locally known as xiaomei niuganjun (Chinese: 小美牛肝菌) was generally thought to be Boletus speciosus until 2013, when it was demonstrated to be a new species known as Butyriboletus roseoflavus.

== Instances ==
=== Papua New Guinea ===
It was first reported by a missionary in 1936 that some bolete mushrooms consumed by natives in Papua New Guinea caused "madness". Subsequently, this phenomenon was described in more detail by anthropologist Marie Reay in the late 1950s, who reported that the mushrooms caused Lilliputian hallucinations. Then, in the mid-1960s, mycologists Gordon Wasson and Roger Heim surveyed 400 mushrooms in the area, described six species claimed to cause "mushroom madness", and sent one purportedly hallucinogenic species, Boletus manicus, to medicinal chemist Albert Hofmann for chemical analysis. Boletus manicus was found by Hofmann to contain trace amounts of three unidentified indole alkaloids. However, the quantities were too low to allow for identification, and the project was thus abandoned. In any case, the detected indolic compounds would need to be extremely potent, on par with lysergic acid diethylamide, to account for the claimed hallucinogenic effects of Boletus manicus. The hypothesis that these indolic compounds are indeed highly potent hallucinogens has been treated both seriously, for instance by Heim, and critiqued and discounted, for instance by ethnobotanist Jonathan Ott. Heim, who notably discovered Boletus manicus, reported that his own consumption of tiny amounts of the raw mushroom led to no other effects besides strange dreams.

Heim, Wasson, and Reay ultimately concluded in the 1960s that, due to their inability to identify active constituents and due to the lack of consistency in reported effects, the claims of "mushroom madness" were really just "social catharsis" and ritualistically and theatrically "acting out", rather than a pharmacological effect. On the other hand, Giorgio Samorini, a contemporary psychedelic researcher, has theorized that this conclusion may have been premature and that the mushrooms may indeed be psychoactive. In a 2006 survey of the village by Roland Treu and Win Adamson, it was found that much of the local knowledge of the mushrooms had been lost and the last known incidence of the mushrooms being consumed and producing hallucinogenic effects was in the mid-1980s. Only a few people with direct experience with the mushrooms remained alive. One man asserted that the mushrooms did indeed cause him to experience Lilliputian hallucinations.

Hallucinogenic bolete researchers Bryn Dentinger and Colin Domnauer traveled to Papua New Guinea in December 2025 in search of the mushrooms of Wasson and Heim's records, but they were unable to find them.

=== Yunnan, China ===
Certain blue-staining edible boletes in the Yunnan province of China are said to be hallucinogenic mushrooms. This was first reported in 1991, was observed by mycologist David Arora by 1997, and was more thoroughly reported by Arora in 2008. However, the Chinese Daoist Ge Hong wrote in Baopuzi (The Master Who Embraces Simplicity) around 300 CE that eating a certain wild mushroom raw would result in unique hallucinations and attainment of transcendence, suggesting that Lanmaoa asiatica may have been used in traditional Chinese medicine for at least one thousand years. The mushrooms are said to become non-hallucinogenic with proper cooking, which presumably destroys their active constituents, and are commonly consumed in well-cooked form as food in the province. There have been cases of unintended hallucinogenic mushroom poisonings when the mushrooms are accidentally undercooked. However, it has been hypothesized that some level of cooking may be required for the mushrooms to become hallucinogenic. The mushrooms are said to make people see the "xiao ren ren" and these hallucinations are said to be reminiscent of Lilliputian hallucinations. Aside from the "xiao ren ren" hallucinations, hallucinogenic bolete mushrooms are also reported to make people see walls moving and shifting in geometrical patterns, and to cause bizarre object transformations (e.g shoelaces turning into butterflies that fly away), the active compounds can also make everything appear very beautiful, and can also produce extreme gastrointestinal distress.

The exact bolete species that produce hallucinogenic effects are not entirely clear, at least as of 2008, due to difficulty in identification, due to many of the different species closely resembling one another on account of convergent evolution, and related to the fact that the people in the region are known to eat hundreds of different mushroom species. As a result, it is unclear whether it is one species or multiple that may be causing the hallucinations. In any case, popular edible species in the province include Butyriboletus roseoflavus, Lanmaoa asiatica, Sutorius magnificus, and Rubroboletus sinicus. The active constituents of the mushrooms likewise have not yet been identified. The phenomenon of hallucinogenic bolete mushroom intoxication in China is well-known and frequently covered in local and national media in the country.

The earliest report, published in 1991 by a Yunnan hospital, described 300 cases of xiaomei niuganjun (Note: Originally translated as Boletus speciosus, more likely Butyriboletus roseoflavus.) poisonings, with effects starting 6 to 24 hours after consumption, lasting days to months, and including both open-eye and closed-eye Lilliputian hallucinations of people and animals. Other effects in more serious cases included psychosis- or schizophrenia-like symptoms, auditory hallucinations, pareidolia, disturbed thinking, aberrant behavior, personality disintegration, and stupor. Most cases resolved within a few days, some within 10 to 30 days, in a subset of cases after more than a month, and in a few cases within half a year. There were no deaths or relapses. In those with stupor, electroencephalogram (EEG) found LSD-like changes. The antipsychotic chlorpromazine was reportedly effective in managing symptoms. The same researchers administered extracts of the mushrooms to animals, including to dogs and to a rhesus monkey, and found that they produced abnormal behavior that started after 5 to 12 hours and lasted up to 2 days. Stupor was observed in the monkey similarly to human poisonings.

A news article in 2014 reported that a Yunnan woman was purposely and repeatedly consuming hallucinogenic bolete mushrooms so that she could have hallucinations of and thereby see her deceased daughter. A case series of mushrooms identified as xiaomei niuganjun causing visual and auditory hallucinations in two women was published in the Chinese literature by a Beijing hospital in 2014. The symptoms onset after 6 to 12 hours, resulted in the women going to the hospital after 12 hours, and lasted for up to 5 days. Similarly, in 2016, a case report was published of hallucinogenic mushroom poisoning in a Hong Kong woman who had consumed a bolete that had been purchased in the Yunnan province. Her symptoms included dizziness, malaise, and visual hallucinations. They onset 10 hours after consumption and resolved after 48 hours. The mushroom was identified as Tylopilus nigerrimus (reclassified as Retiboletus nigerrimus) and is generally considered inedible. This was the first report of hallucinogenic effects with this mushroom species in the English-language literature.

Larger series of mushroom poisonings, including hallucinations, have also been reported in 2022, 2023, and 2024. In the 2024 series, of 81 patients, symptoms onset after 12 to 24 hours, notably longer than other hallucinogenic mushrooms, were often accompanied by other symptoms such as nausea (54%), vomiting (44%), fatigue (49%), dizziness (36%), diarrhea (15%), and abdominal pain (7.4%), resolved within 1 to 5 days in almost all cases (93%), and no deaths or abnormalities in vitals or blood tests were observed. Lanmaoa asiatica is one of the more frequently implicated bolete mushrooms in producing hallucinogenic effects.

Colin Domnauer and Bryn Dentinger have been studying hallucinogenic bolete mushrooms in the 2020s. Dentinger is said to be one of the world's leading experts on bolete mushrooms. In 2023, it was reported that Domnauer had recently visited Yunnan to collect samples of hallucinogenic bolete mushrooms. Also in 2023, Domnauer and Dentinger published a conference abstract in which they sampled and assessed 12 of the 13 currently accepted species of Lanmaoa mushrooms towards investigations of the psychoactive Yunnan mushrooms. Chinese researchers are also studying the mushroom poisonings.

United States Treasury Secretary Janet Yellen, unbeknownst to her at the time, ate inactivated hallucinogenic bolete mushrooms at a restaurant while visiting China in 2023, and this was widely covered in the media when it occurred.

=== Cordillera, Philippines ===
In 2024, Colin Domnauer published that he had traveled not only to southern China but also to the northern Philippines in his studies of the hallucinogenic Lanmaoa asiatica mushroom. This was in Sagada in the Philippine Cordilleras, to investigate blue-staining boletes, known as "Sedesdem", that were said to be regularly eaten and would irregularly cause people to see the "Ansisit" or "little people" (the Lilliputian hallucinations).

=== Other instances ===
Other Lanmaoa species closely related to Lanmaoa asiatica, such as Lanmaoa pallidorosea, Lanmaoa carminipes, and Lanmaoa flavorubra, exist in North America. Lanmaoa pallidorosea is the most closely related known species to Lanmaoa asiatica. However, there are no reliable reports of intoxication anywhere outside of China, the Philippines, and Papua New Guinea. In any case, Lanmaoa mushrooms are though to not commonly be eaten in North America due to a fear of blue-staining boletes in this part of the world, and so possible hallucinogenic effects of such mushrooms may have been missed. Subsequently, Domnauer has disclosed that L. pallidorosea is somewhat commonly cooked and eaten in the United States, yet there have been no reports of intoxication. Nonetheless, it remains possible that L. pallidorosea may have simply never have been consumed raw by humans.

== Chemistry ==
Boletus curtisii is known to contain β-carboline-1-propanoic acid. Imleria badia and Xerocomellus chrysenteron, which are also bolete mushrooms, have been reported to produce variable amounts of compounds like tyramine and tryptamine. Various natural products have been isolated from Lanmaoa asiatica and research is still ongoing.

It has been hypothesized that hallucinogenic bolete mushrooms might have picked up genes producing hallucinogenic compounds from known hallucinogenic mushrooms like Psilocybe cubensis and Amanita muscaria via horizontal gene transfer events. However, a genetic analysis of the Lanmaoa genus published in 2023 found no evidence of this, suggesting that a novel class of hallucinogens may be present.

Dennis McKenna has suggested that the effects of hallucinogenic bolete mushrooms might be consistent with an unidentified tropane alkaloid. However, according to Colin Domnauer, the effects of Lanmaoa are distinct from those of any other known psychoactive drug.

The plasma metabolic profiles of people experiencing hallucinogenic Lanmaoa asiatica poisoning were studied in 2025.

Domnauer and Dentinger are studying the effects of Lanmaoa asiatica in animals and have found aqueous extracts to produce similar behavioral effects in mice as in humans, for instance hyperactivity followed by a long stupor. They are also working towards identifying the active constituents of L. asiatica. These researchers are preparing findings for publication as of 2026.

Domnauer himself has proposed that the active component of L. asiatica is one or more thermolabile proteins.

== See also ==
- Hallucinogenic mushroom
- Hallucinogenic plants in Chinese herbals
- List of hallucinogens
- Yunnan sudden death syndrome
