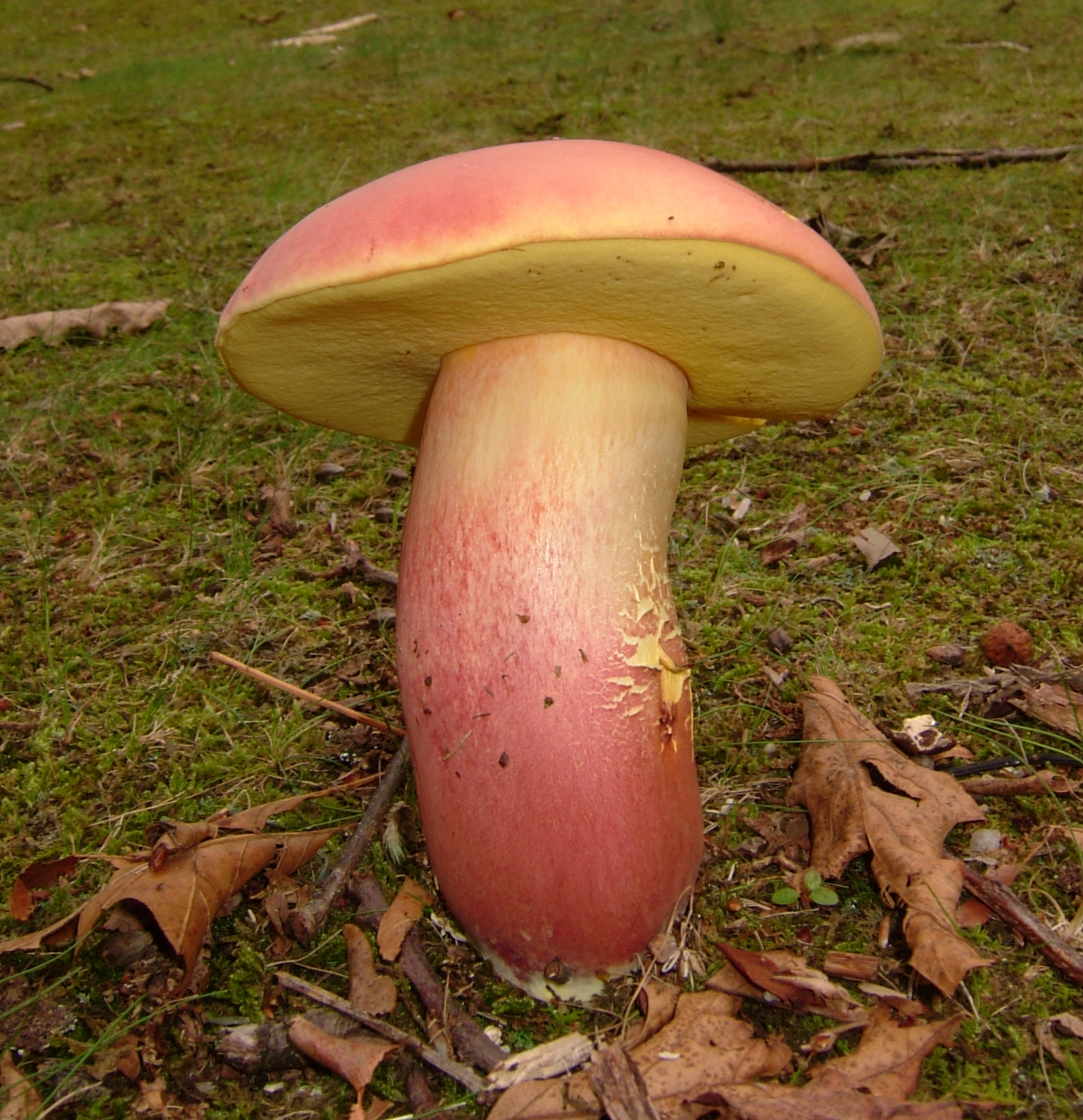

Scientific classification
- Kingdom: Fungi
- Division: Basidiomycota
- Class: Agaricomycetes
- Order: Boletales
- Family: Boletaceae
- Genus: Lanmaoa
- Species: L. pallidorosea

Binomial name
- Lanmaoa pallidorosea (Both) Raspé & Vadthanarat (2019)

= Lanmaoa pallidorosea =

Species of fungus

Lanmaoa pallidorosea, formerly known as Boletus pallidoroseus, is a fungus of the genus Lanmaoa native to North America. It was described scientifically by Ernst Both in 1998. The species was transferred from Boletus to Lanmaoa in 2019. Lanmaoa pallidorosea is the most closely related known species to Lanmaoa asiatica. Lanmaoa asiatica is found in East and Southeast Asia such as in China and the Philippines and is known to produce Lilliputian hallucinations when eaten raw or undercooked. According to mycologist Colin Domnauer, who is studying Lanmaoa asiatica, Lanmaoa pallidorosea is commonly consumed cooked without any negative effects.

== See also ==
- List of North American boletes
