= Thermoresponsive polymers in chromatography =

Thermoresponsive polymers can be used as stationary phase in liquid chromatography. Here, the polarity of the stationary phase can be varied by temperature changes, altering the power of separation without changing the column or solvent composition. Thermally related benefits of gas chromatography can now be applied to classes of compounds that are restricted to liquid chromatography due to their thermolability. In place of solvent gradient elution, thermoresponsive polymers allow the use of temperature gradients under purely aqueous isocratic conditions. The versatility of the system is controlled not only through changing temperature, but through the addition of modifying moieties that allow for a choice of enhanced hydrophobic interaction, or by introducing the prospect of electrostatic interaction. These developments have already introduced major improvements to the fields of hydrophobic interaction chromatography, size exclusion chromatography, ion exchange chromatography, and affinity chromatography separations as well as pseudo-solid phase extractions ("pseudo" because of phase transitions).

== Hydrophobic interaction chromatography ==
=== Gel permeation chromatography ===
The research that appeared to spark an onslaught of modified applications was a gel permeation chromatography technique of fixing poly(isopropyl acrylate) (PIPA) strands to glass beads and separating a mixture of dextrans, which was developed by Gewehr et al. They found that between the temperatures of 25–32 °C, the elution time of dextrans at different molecular weights exhibited a dependence on the temperature. Dextrans of the highest molecular weight eluted first since the PIPA chains exhibit hydrophilicity at temperatures below the LCST. As the temperature of the elution increased, when the chains behave in a more hydrophobic manner, the elution times increased for each of the analytes for the given range. The trend generally applies over the entire temperature range, but there is a flattening of the curve before 25 °C and after 32 °C (the approximate LCST for this experiment). Above the LCST, the PIPA acts as a typical nonpolar stationary phase that would be used in reverse-phased chromatography. There are also instances of the elution times increasing below 15 °C, which most likely can be attributed to the lower temperatures’ effects on mass transfer playing a more significant role on retention than the stationary phase behavior. This study showed that the resolution could essentially be tuned by adjusting the operating temperature. The scope of this study was limited to isothermal conditions and attaching polymer chains to glass beads. The results, however, were satisfying enough to inspire other investigations and modifications to create a more versatile stationary phase for the advancement of chromatography.

=== Enhancing hydrophobic interaction ===
Okano’s group expanded on their success by using different modifiers to enhance hydrophobicity through the attachment of butyl methacrylate (BMA), a hydrophobic comonomer. For simplification the resultant polymer has been labeled as IBc (isopropylacrylamide butyl methacrylate copolymer). The polymers were synthesized using radical telomerization with varying BMA content. Where pure PNIPAAm was unable to resolve hydrophobic steroids at any temperature, IBc-grafted silica stationary phases were able to resolve steroid peaks with increasingly retarded retention times in correlation to both increased BMA content and increased temperature. They went on to develop a method to separate phenylthiohydantoin(PTH)-amino acids using their IBc stationary phase with a stronger emphasis of implementing environmentally friendly conditions using a purely aqueous phase in HPLC. Another group separated catechins using PNIPAAm.

=== Modifying the LCST for improved experimental parameters ===
Since the separation of biological molecules such as proteins would be better served by isocratic elution with an aqueous solvent, resolution of HPLC analysis should be tweaked in the area of stationary phases to elute such analytes that may be sensitive to organic solvents. Kanazawa et al. recognized the possibility of changing the LCST parameter through the addition of different moieties. Kanazawa’s group investigated the reversible changes of PNIPAAm once modifying it with a carboxyl end. It was suggested that the modification leads to faster changes in conformation due to the restrictions introduced by the carboxyl group. They attached the carboxyl-terminated PNIPAAm chains to (aminopropyl)silica and used it as packing material for HPLC analysis of steroids. The separation took place under isocratic conditions using pure water as the mobile phase, and controlled the temperature using a water bath. They were able to shift the LCST from 32 °C to 20 °C by making the solution 1M in NaCl concentration. Of the 5 steroids and benzene, only testosterone could be resolved from the other peaks below the LCST (5 °C, LCST=20 °C in 1M NaCl). Above the LCST (25 °C, LCST=20 °C in 1M NaCl), all of the peaks are well resolved, and there is an increasing trend of retention time versus temperature up to 50 °C.

== Size exclusion chromatography ==
Prior to these studies, HPLC analyses were tuned by modifying the mobile and stationary phases only. Gradient elution for HPLC merely meant changing the ratio of solvents to improve column efficiency, and this requires the use of sophisticated solvent pumping mechanisms along with extra steps and precautions in the chromatographic analysis. Enlightened by the prospect of using temperature gradient elutions for HPLC analyses, Hosoya et al. sought to make surface modification of HPLC stationary phases more accessible. Their study utilizes graft-type copolymerization of PNIPAAm onto macroporous polymeric materials. The in-situ preparation compared the use of cyclohexanol and toluene as porogens in the preparation of the modified polystyrene seeds. Reverse-phased size-exclusion chromatography (SEC) revealed pore size and pore size distribution of the particles and its dependence on temperature. Cyclohexanol acted as a successful porogen showing a dependent relationship of pore size to temperature. The use of toluene as a porogen gave results that were similar to unmodified macroporous particles. This indicates that PNIPAAm can be successfully grafted onto the surface and within the pores of macroporous materials. The application of this preparatory technique gives rise to tunable pore sizes. Temperature gradient elutions can be used to improve column efficiency through the changing of pore size in SEC. The mechanism of the change in pore size is simple, the pores are smaller under LCST due to the elongated chains of PNIPAAm within the pores, as temperature increases to and above LCST, the chains retract into a globular formation increasing the pore size.

== Ion-exchange chromatography ==
Modification had also been extended past hydrophobic and hydrophilic attachments, charged compounds have also been introduced to TRPs. Kobayashi et al. had previously performed successful modifications to separate bioactive ionic compounds, and continued on that success to improve separation efficiency of bioactive compounds. Common methods of separating angiotensin peptides had involved reverse-phased high-performance liquid chromatography (RP-HPLC) and cation-exchange chromatography. RP-HPLC requires the use of organic solvents, which is not favored and current trends are moving away from that. Hydrophobic interaction chromatography requires high concentration salt elutions and eluent cleaning to remove the salt. To address the shortcomings of the previous methods, Kobayashi’s group grafted acrylic acid (anionic acrylate under neutral conditions) and tert-butylacrylamide (hydrophobic) monomers onto PNIPAAm, resulting in PNIPAAm-co-AAc-co-tBAAm (IAtB) onto silica beads as a stationary phase medium. The reason for incorporating both ionic and hydrophobic compounds is multifaceted. The ionic compound improves interactivity with the ionic species, but raises the LCST significantly. The hydrophobic addition counteracts against the raise in LCST and lowers it to a more standard value, but also interacts with the hydrophobic surfaces of biological compounds. This resulted in successful and resolved elution of angiotensin peptides. Additionally, they were able to tune the retention factor for the analytes through isocratic temperature gradient elution. Ideal elutions occurred at 35 °C, but decreasing the temperature to 10 °C or raising it to 50 °C caused faster elutions either way. This is a strong indication that electrostatic and hydrophobic interactions can be similarly affected by changes in temperature. The major advantages from applying these success of this study include stationary phase versatility and maintaining bioactivity of the analytes.

Ayano et al. modified PNIPAAm with cationic N,N-dimethylaminopropylacrylamide (DMAPAAm) and hydrophobic BMA and grafted it onto silica beads to form IDB. They used pH changes to adjust the LCST. The effect of pH on the LCST is as follows, from a plateau value between pH 4.5 and pH 6.0, the LCST decreased up to pH 9 and below pH 4.5. This can be interpreted as requiring slightly basic or moderately acidic conditions, as the 4.5–6.0 pH region holds a maximum value of the LCST, an unfavorable condition. They used these properties to separate several non-steroidal anti-inflammatory drugs (NSAIDs). The analysis of acidic drugs (salicylic acid: BA; SA; MS; and As) was performed below pH 4.5. MS is hydrophobic only its retention time was affected by an increase in temperature on the column without a terminally modified anion-exchanger (IB column). However, with an anion-exchanger present, dissociated acidic drugs were retained longer at temperatures below LCST, and shorter at temperatures above LCST. When the IBD column compared to recently established PNIPAAm columns, electrostatic forces show remarkably higher retention ability of charged compounds than its hydrophilic predecessor. A single stationary phase can accomplish pharmaceutical separations based on hydrophobic interactions, hydrophilic interactions, and electrostatic interactions merely by adjusting the temperature (while adjusting pH to tweak the LCST).

== Affinity chromatography ==
Selective enzyme and antibody separation can be achieved with the use of specific end groups that conjugate with the specific compounds. This results in a formation of a polymer-enzyme conjugate which can be reversibly precipitated and dissolved by changing the temperature. Chen and Hoffman used N-Hydroxysuccinimide (NHS) ester functional end group on NIPAAm to conjugate selectively with β-D-glucosidase. They found that the conjugated enzyme could be repeatedly precipitated and dissolved in solution and still maintain sufficient enzymatic activity.

In a study that was published in 1998, Hoshino et al. prepared a TRP with a maltose ligand, evaluated it with concanavalin A (Con A), and attempted to separate and purify α-glucosidase, a thermolabile compound. Since the goal is to selectively isolate a thermolabile enzyme, a TRP with a small LCST value is desired. To fit this condition, the selected TRP was poly(N-acryloylpiperidine)-cysteamine (pAP), which has an LCST of 4 °C. The terminally bound maltose moiety maintains affinity for both analytes, thus the modified TRP, pAPM, met critical conditions of external temperature requirements and affinity for both target analytes. The solubility properties changed from 4 °C (soluble) to 8 °C (insoluble). Several reagents were tested for the recovery of Con A by desorption which had higher binding affinities to Con A than maltose. These reagents were α-D-glucopyranoside, D-mannose, methyl α-D-mannopyranoside, and glucose. α-D-mannopyranoside was the most effective for desorbing Con A from pAPM at virtually 100% after 1 hour. As a control, pAPM was used to bind Con A from a crude extract, which found the pickup of several impurities but still managed to recover 80% of Con A. This exemplifies the need for selective moieties, maltose not residing among them. Finally, the application of pAPM was tested by attempting to separate α-glucosidase from yeast extract under low temperature conditions. In conclusion, the pAPM was found to recover 68% of α-glucosidase activity tested against, maltose being the selected desorption reagent.

Another interesting development for AC was involved with antibody separation using another TRP-ligand combination. Anastase-Ravion et al. attached a dextran derivative to the classic PNIPAAm to result in a poly(NIPAAm)-DD, and used this stationary phase to separate polyclonal antibodies from subcutaneous rabbit serum. From the study, the dextran derivative of choice was carboxymethyl dextran benzylamide sulfonate/sulfate, and when bound to the TRP was labeled poly(NIPAAm)-CMDBS. The LCST for the poly(NIPAAm)-CMDBS was raised from 32 °C to 33 °C. To test the success of the affinity binding, the antibodies were eluted with glycine buffer (adjusted to pH 2.6 with HCl).

Promising results were obtained in 2003 in a study that merged the newer developments in affinity chromatography with microfluidic devices. Upon the development of microfluidic technology, coupling it with affinity chromatography meant modifying channel surfaces, packing coated beads, or packing with coated porous material, neither of which allow for replenishing the columns. This produces limitations that prevent the packing material from being changed or the column being regenerated. The approach they took to address those challenges meant incorporating TRP particles as a reversibly immobilized stationary phase. What separates this development from other AC methods is that the beads on which the modified TRP are attached can reversibly adhere to the inner surfaces of the microfluidic channels. The formulation of the smart bead matrix is a little complex, but in general PNIPAAm is modified two times, first with NHS, then with polyethylene glycol-biotin (PEG-b) resulting in PEG-b/pNIPAAm beads. The inner surface of the microfluidic channels is composed of polyethylene terephthalate, to which the PEG-b/pNIPAAm beads reversibly bind above the LCST. When the sample solution is passed through the channels, the target analyte binds to the biotin ligand. The temperature can then be brought below the LCST to dissociate and become removed from the inner channels. This allows for a system adept to being reloaded with stationary phase under mild conditions. They successfully separated and eluted Streptavidin. Further application of these procedures allow for portable AC columns which can be packed on site and used for local or clinical analytical separations of complex biological fluids.
