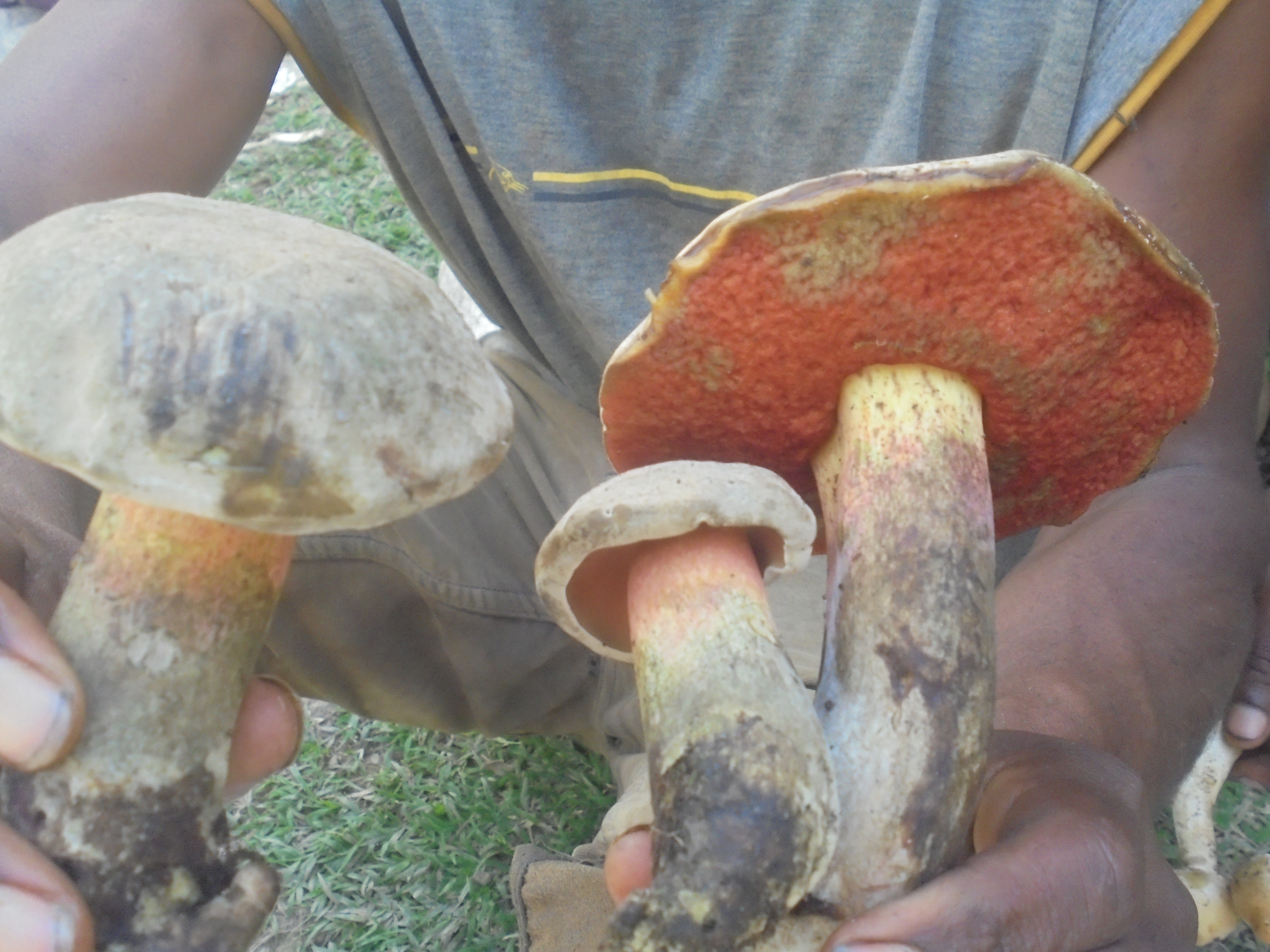

Scientific classification
- Kingdom: Fungi
- Division: Basidiomycota
- Class: Agaricomycetes
- Order: Boletales
- Family: Boletaceae
- Genus: Boletus
- Species: B. manicus

Binomial name
- Boletus manicus R. Heim

= Boletus manicus =

Species of fungus

Boletus manicus
- Mycological characteristics
- Pores on hymenium
- Cap is convex
- Hymenium is adnate
- Stipe is bare
- Ecology is mycorrhizal
- Edibility is unknown or psychoactive

Boletus manicus is a species of fungus in the family Boletaceae of mushrooms. Found in the Wahgi valley region of Papua New Guinea, it was first described by French mycologist Roger Heim in 1963. Heim was interested in this mushroom largely because it resembles the Devil's Bolete (Rubroboletus satanas). In the Wahgi language it is called gegwantsyi ngimbl. The word ngimbl means pain, which metaphorically describes the intense bitter taste of this mushroom.

It has been reported that B. manicus may be a hallucinogenic mushroom. However, this claim is rather controversial. B. manicus is known to contain trace amounts of three unidentified indole alkaloids. These were detected by famous medicinal chemist Albert Hofmann, but the quantities were too low to allow for proper identification. The natural products from this mushroom would need to be extremely potent, on par with Hoffmann's LSD-25, to account for the proposed effects of B. manicus. The hypothesis that these indolic compounds are indeed highly potent hallucinogens has been treated both seriously, for instance by Heim, and discounted, for instance by Jonathan Ott. Other bolete species besides B. manicus have also been reported to be hallucinogenic mushrooms, such as the famous Lanmaoa asiatica of Yunnan, China.

== See also ==
- Hallucinogenic bolete mushroom
- List of Boletus species
