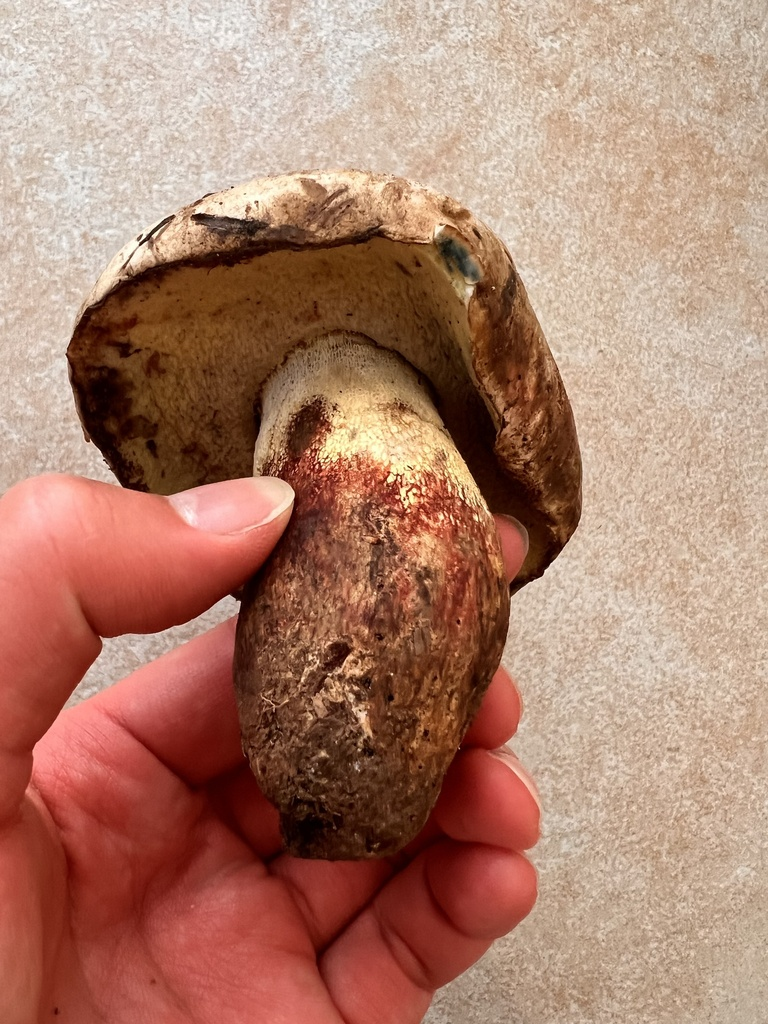
- Butyriboletus roseoflavus collected from Yunnan's Tianbishan Chengjiao Leisure Park.

Scientific classification
- Kingdom: Fungi
- Division: Basidiomycota
- Class: Agaricomycetes
- Order: Boletales
- Family: Boletaceae
- Genus: Butyriboletus
- Species: B. roseoflavus

Binomial name
- Butyriboletus roseoflavus (M.Zang & Hai B.Li) D.Arora & J.L.Frank (2014)

Synonyms
- Boletus roseoflavus M.Zang & Hai B.Li (2013)

= Butyriboletus roseoflavus =

Species of fungus

Butyriboletus roseoflavus
- Mycological characteristics
- Pores on hymenium
- Cap is convex
- Hymenium is adnate
- Stipe is bare
- Spore print is olive-brown
- Ecology is mycorrhizal
- Edibility is unknown

Butyriboletus roseoflavus is a species of fungus in the genus Butyriboletus that is found in Asia. It was originally described in 2013 as a species of Boletus, but was transferred the following year to the newly created genus Butyriboletus.

It is known as xiaomei niuganjun (Chinese: 小美牛肝菌; lit. 'little pretty bolete') or huamei niuganjun (Chinese: 华美牛肝菌; lit. 'fancy pretty bolete') in Yunnan and huandian niuganjun (Chinese: 黄靛牛肝菌; lit. 'yellow-cyan bolete') in Zhejiang.

Edibility is unknown, but a mushroom identified as xiaomei niuganjun is implicated in a 2014 poisoning leading to delirium and lilliputian hallucinations.

== See also ==
- Hallucinogenic bolete mushroom
