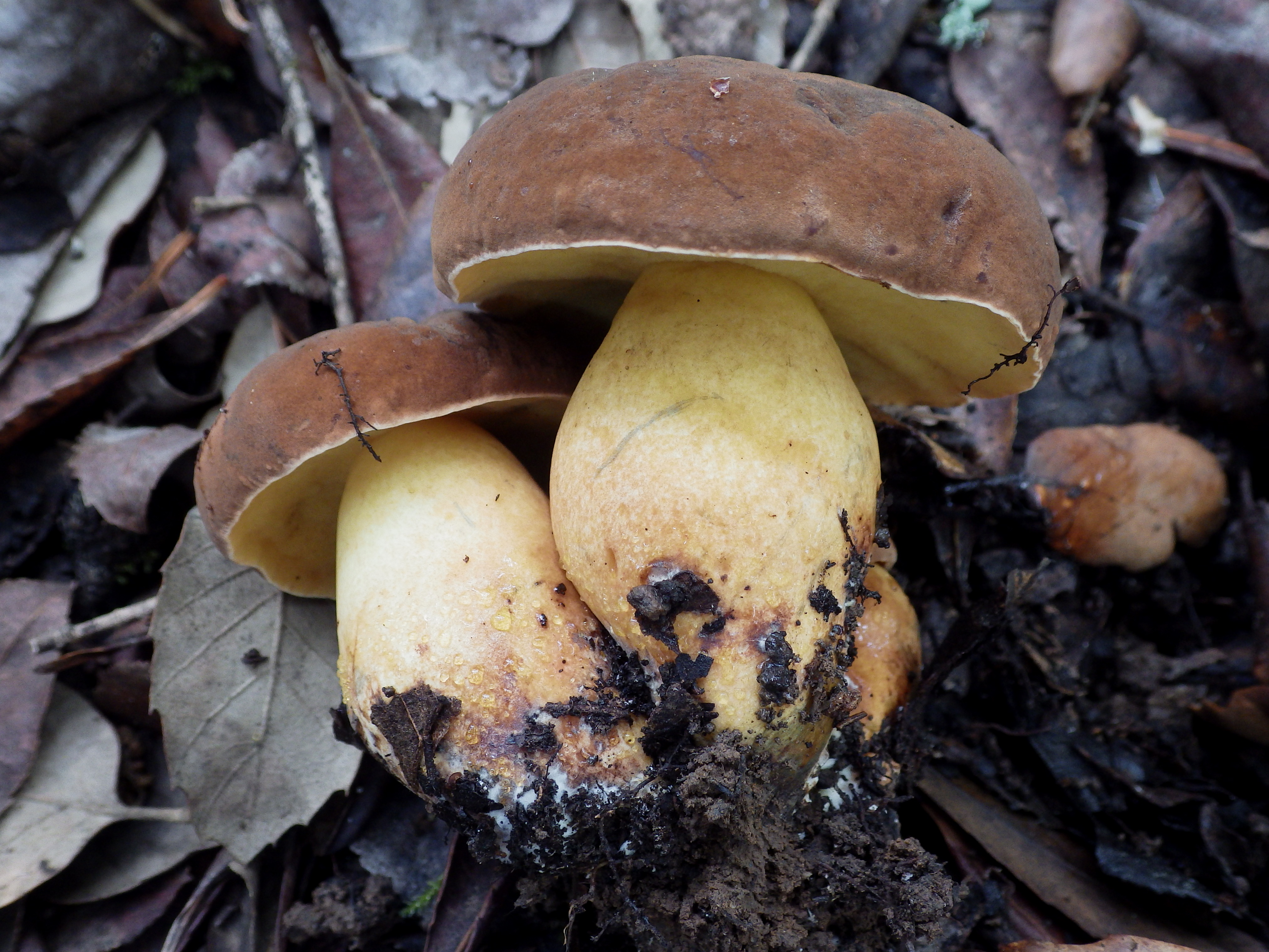

Scientific classification
- Kingdom: Fungi
- Division: Basidiomycota
- Class: Agaricomycetes
- Order: Boletales
- Family: Boletaceae
- Genus: Lanmaoa
- Species: L. fragrans

Binomial name
- Lanmaoa fragrans Vittad. (1835)

Synonyms
- Boletus fragrans Vittad. (1835); Versipellis fragrans (Vittad.) Quél. (1886); Suillus fragrans (Vittad.) Kuntze (1898); Tubiporus fragrans (Vittad.) Ricken (1918); Leccinum fragrans (Vittad.) Šutara (1989)

= Lanmaoa fragrans =

Species of fungus

Lanmaoa fragrans is a rare species of bolete fungus in the family Boletaceae found in Europe. It has a brownish convex cap measuring 5–12 cm (2.0–4.7 in) in diameter that initially has a velvety texture before becoming smooth. The spindle-shaped stipe measures 7–9 cm (2.8–3.5 in) long by 3–5 cm (1.2–2.0 in) wide. It is yellow at the top and flushed with red in the lower portions, terminating with black at the very base. The yellow flesh is tinged with red under the cap cuticle. It bruises blue only after several hours of exposure to air. The pores on the cap underside are lemon-yellow to chrome-yellow and display a faint blue bruising reaction. Spores are elliptical and measure 9–14 by 4.5–6.5 μm; in mass they produce an olive-green spore print.

Lanmaoa fragrans is most often reported from southern Europe, where it grows in a mycorrhizal association with oaks. It is edible, with a pleasant taste and aroma. Although Lanmaoa fragrans has been occasionally reported from North America, this version has a different mycorrhizal associate (conifers) and it is not known if it is the same as the European species. Originally described in 1835 by Italian mycologist Carlo Vittadini as a species of Boletus, the fungus was transferred to Lanmaoa in 2015 by Alfredo Vizzini.
