= Streptomyces piniterrae =

Scientific classification
- Domain: Bacteria
- Kingdom: Bacillati
- Phylum: Actinomycetota
- Class: Actinomycetia
- Order: Streptomycetales
- Family: Streptomycetaceae
- Genus: Streptomyces
- Species: S. piniterrae

Binomial name
- Streptomyces piniterrae Zhuang et al. 2020

Type strain
- jys28

Species of bacterium

Streptomyces piniterrae is a bacterium species from the genus of Streptomyces which has been isolated from rhizosphereic soil of the tree Pinus yunnanensis. Streptomyces piniterrae produces heliquinomycin and 9'-methoxy-heliquinomycin.

== See also ==
- List of Streptomyces species
