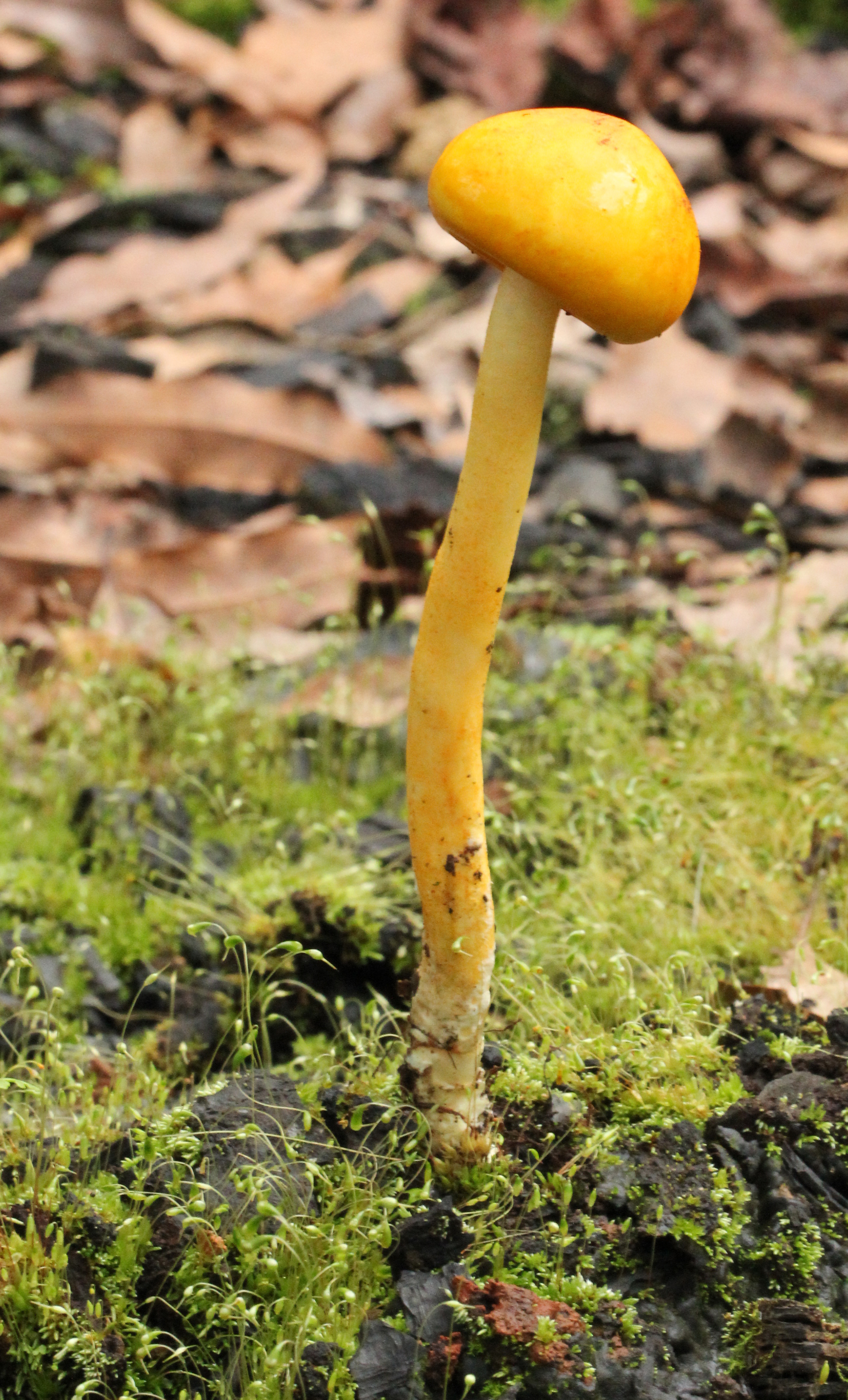

Scientific classification
- Kingdom: Fungi
- Division: Basidiomycota
- Class: Agaricomycetes
- Order: Boletales
- Family: Boletaceae
- Genus: Boletus
- Species: B. curtisii

Binomial name
- Boletus curtisii Berk. (1853)

Synonyms
- Ceriomyces curtisii (Berk.) Murrill (1909); Pulveroboletus curtisii (Berk.) Singer (1947)

= Boletus curtisii =

Species of fungus

Boletus curtisii
- Mycological characteristics
- Pores on hymenium
- Cap is convex
- Hymenium is adnate
- Stipe is bare
- Spore print is olive-brown
- Ecology is mycorrhizal
- Edibility is edible

Boletus curtisii is a species of fungus in the family Boletaceae. Once classified as a species of Pulveroboletus, the yellow color of B. curtisii is a result of pigments chemically distinct from those responsible for the yellow coloring of Pulveroboletus.

It produces small- to medium-sized fruit bodies (mushrooms) with a convex cap up to 9.5 cm (3.7 in) wide atop a slender stem that can reach a length of 12 cm (4.7 in). In young specimens, the cap and stem are bright golden yellow, although the color dulls to brownish when old. Both the stem and cap are slimy or sticky when young. On the underside of the cap are small circular to angular pores.

The mushroom is found in eastern and southern North America, where it grows in a mycorrhizal association with hardwood and conifer trees. It is edible, but not appealing.

== Taxonomy ==
The species was first described scientifically by English mycologist Miles Joseph Berkeley in 1853. The specific epithet curtisii honors Moses Ashley Curtis, who collected the type material from South Carolina.

American mycologist William Murrill called it Ceriomyces curtisii in 1909, but Ceriomyces (as defined by Murrill in 1909) has since been subsumed into Boletus. In his 1947 monograph on boletes of Florida, Rolf Singer transferred the species to the genus Pulveroboletus, and made it the type of his newly described section Cartilaginei, which featured species with a glutinous or sticky stem, and a leather-colored to brownish hymenophore. Species in Pulveroboletus are characterized by the presence of pigments based on the chemical structure of pulvinic acid, a yellow-orange compound found in some species of Boletales. The pigments responsible for the color of B. curtisii are, however, entirely different from the pulvinic acid compounds found in Pulveroboletus species, which invalidates the chemotaxonomical rational for generic placement in Pulveroboletus. Otto Kuntze once placed the species in Suillus, but it lacks the partial veil and glandular dots associated with that genus. William Chambers Coker and Alma Beers considered Charles Horton Peck's Boletus inflexus (described from New York in 1895) as well as Henry Curtis Beardslee's 1915 B. carolinensis to be the same species as B. curtisii. Coker and Beer's suggested synonymy, however, is not recognized by the taxonomical authorities MycoBank or Index Fungorum.

Wally Snell once considered Boletus carolinensis to be the same species as B. curtisii. He claimed that the former species was then considered distinct from the latter by virtue of an even, instead of reticulate (netlike) stem, although they were otherwise quite similar in appearance and spore size and shape. Snell explained that although neither the English nor the Latin text of Berkeley's original description mentioned a reticulated stem, a later (1872) description by Berkeley characterized the stem as reticulato. Snell thought that this might have been an error in transcription, or an error in the species account, as herbarium specimens that he had examined lacked this feature. He changed his mind a couple of years later, when he found a small amount of reticulation in material collected by Peck.

== Description ==
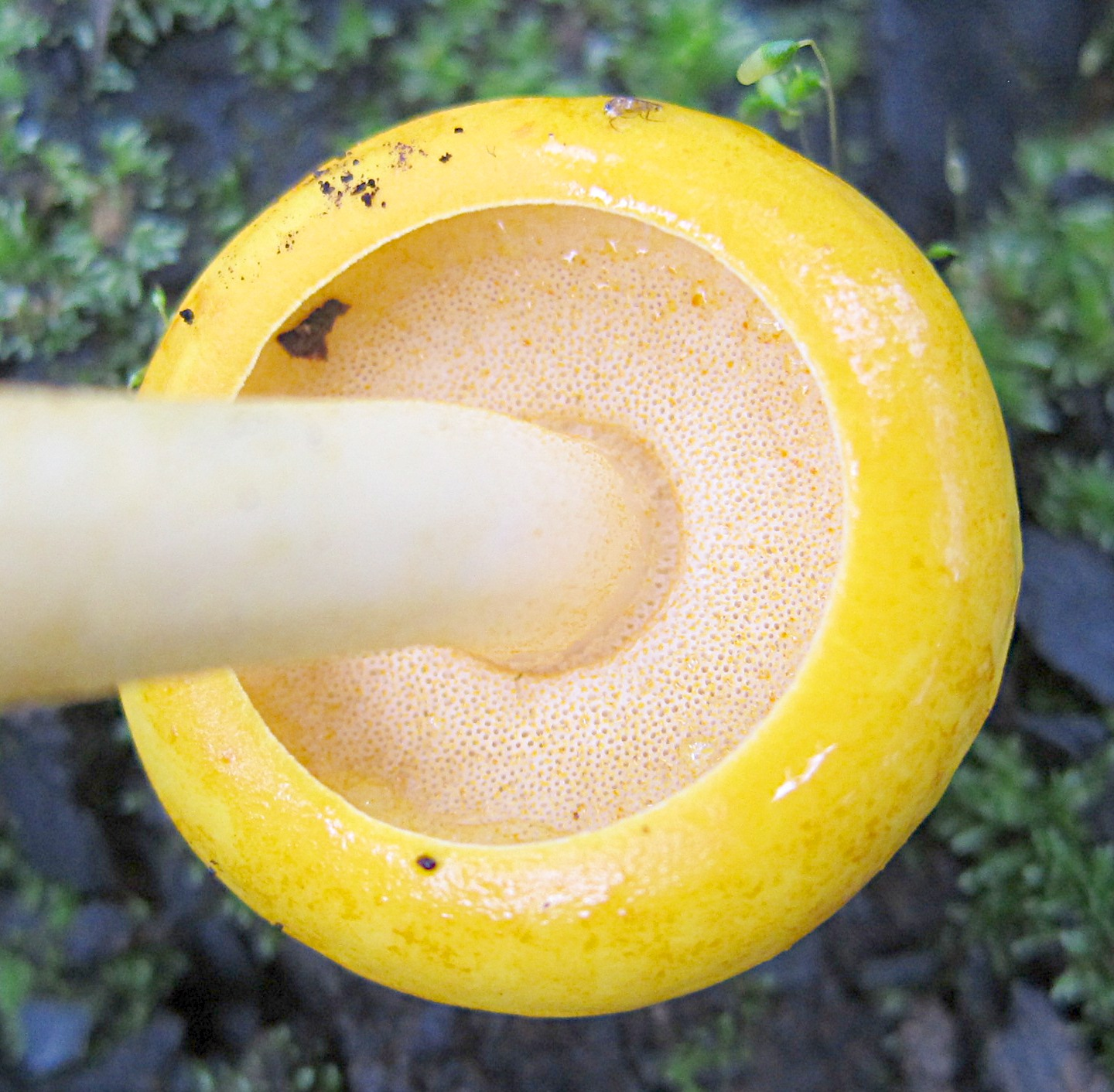
View of the cap underside, showing the inrolled margin, small white pores, and droplets of golden yellow liquid.

The cap is 3–9.5 cm (1.2–3.7 in) wide, and initially obtuse to convex in shape before becoming broadly convex to nearly flat when mature. The cap margin has a narrow band of sterile tissue that in young fruit bodies is curved inwards. The cap surface is somewhat sticky when fresh, smooth, and bright yellow to orange-yellow, sometimes with brownish tints or whitish areas in age. The whitish flesh does not change color when exposed to air, and has no distinctive odor or taste. On the underside of the cap, the pore surface is initially whitish to buff or pale yellow, but becomes duller and darker at maturity, often depressed near the stem in age. Unlike some other boletes, B. curtisii does not turn blue when bruised or injured. The pores are circular to angular, and there are 2–3 per mm; the tubes are 6–12 mm deep. Young fruit bodies usually have droplets of golden yellow liquid on the pore surface (sometimes abundantly so), although this is rarely observed in older specimens.

The stem is 5–12 cm (2.0–4.7 in) long, 0.6–1.3 cm (0.2–0.5 in) thick, and roughly equal in width throughout. Its surface is sticky and glutinous when fresh, somewhat scurfy near the apex (covered with loose scales) but smooth below. It is pale yellow to yellow down to the base, which is sheathed with a cottony white mycelium. The stem can be either solid or hollow. The mushroom lacks a partial veil and a ring. The spore print is olive-brown to reddish-brown.

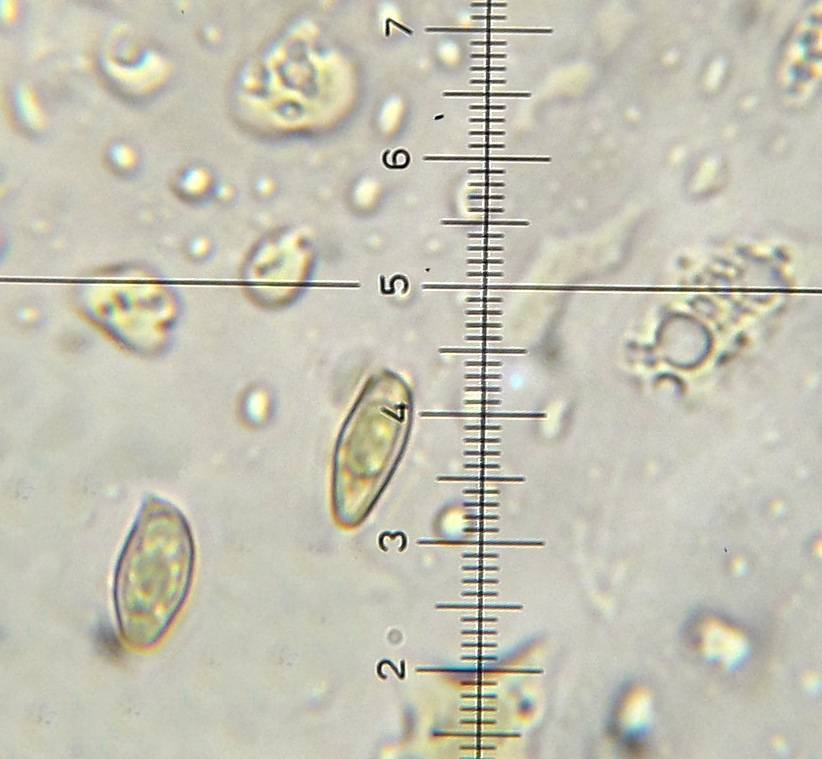
The smooth, yellowish spores have an ellipsoid to somewhat ventricose shape. 1000x magnification; divisions are 1 μm

The spores are 9.5–17 by 4–6 μm, ellipsoid to somewhat ventricose (inflated on one side), smooth, and yellowish. The basidia (spore-bearing cells) are four-spored, measuring 25–32 by 6–10.8 μm. The cystidia lining the inside of the tubes are shaped like setae (i.e., thick-walled and thornlike) and have dimensions of 43–86 by 6.5–11 μm. All hyphae lack clamp connections.

=== Similar species ===
Retiboletus retipes is somewhat similar in appearance, but is distinguished by a more orange to orange-yellow color, a lack of sliminess, and a distinctly reticulated stalk.

== Habitat and distribution ==
The fruit bodies of B. curtisii grow singly, scattered, or in small groups on the ground in coniferous or mixed woods, often with pines. Fruit bodies generally appear from August to November. The geographical distribution of the fungus is limited to eastern and southern North America. In the United States, it occurs from New England south to Florida, and west to Texas. The species was newly reported from Mexico in 2001.

== Uses ==
The mushroom is edible, but not appealing.

The fruit bodies of B. curtisii contain a unique series of derivatives of the molecule canthin-6-one. Before this discovery, canthin-6-one alkaloids were only known from higher plants. Among the canthin-6-one derivatives are the pigments that give the mushroom its bright yellow color, including two optically active sulfoxides named curtisin and 9-deoxycurtisin. Spraying a fruit body with methanol causes the pigments to dissolve and makes the color wash away—a phenomenon unknown in other bolete mushrooms. Additionally, spraying fruit bodies with acetone results in a green-yellow fluorescence visible in daylight.

== See also ==
- List of Boletus species
- List of North American boletes
