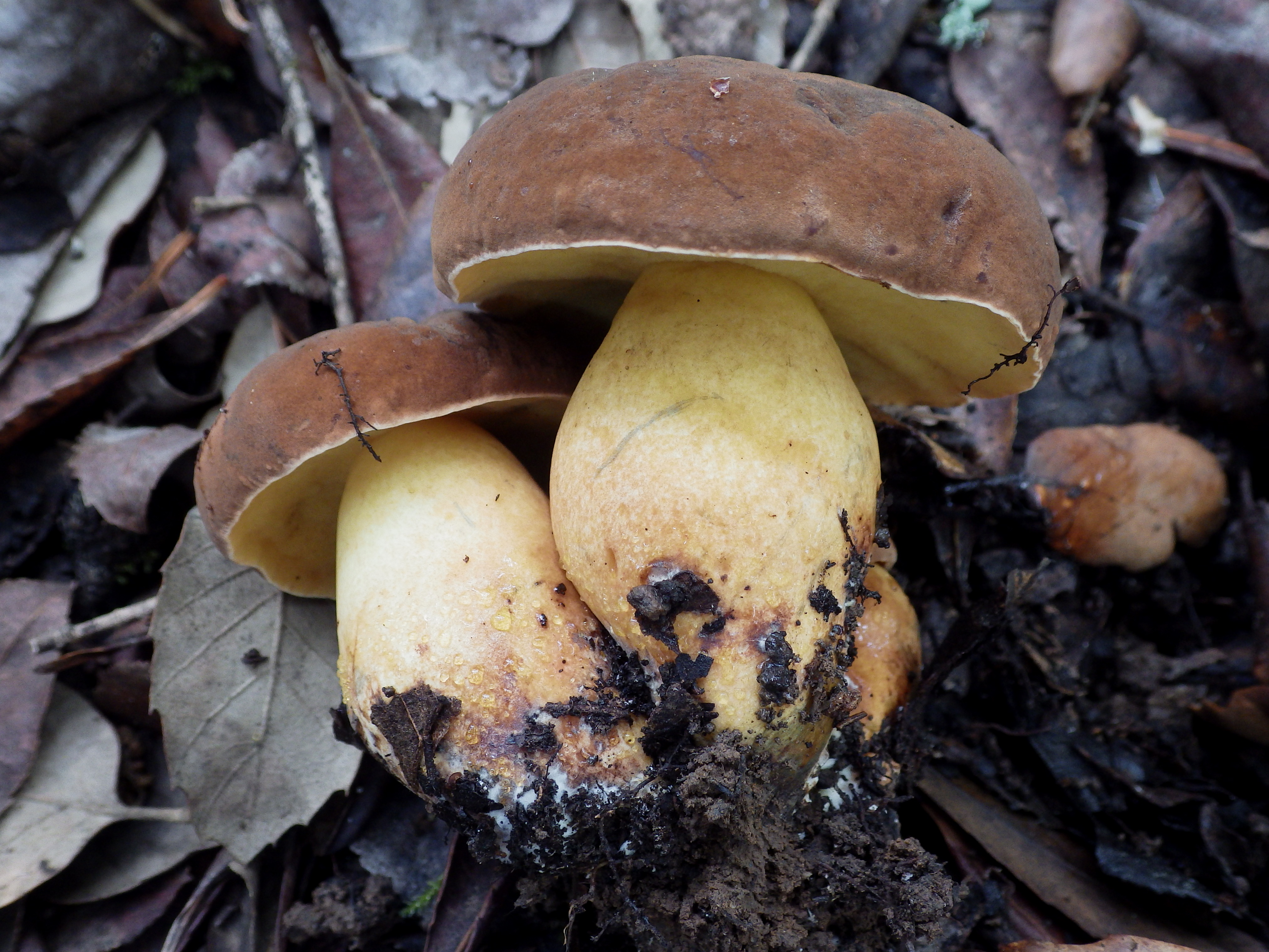
- Lanmaoa fragrans

Scientific classification
- Kingdom: Fungi
- Division: Basidiomycota
- Class: Agaricomycetes
- Order: Boletales
- Family: Boletaceae
- Genus: Lanmaoa; N.K.Zeng & Zhu L.Yang (2015)

Type species
- Lanmaoa asiatica G.Wu & Zhu L.Yang (2015)

Species
- See text

= Lanmaoa =

Genus of fungi

Lanmaoa is a fungal genus in the family Boletaceae. It was circumscribed by Chinese mycologists Nian-Kai Zeng and Zhu L. Yang in 2015 to contain several species formerly classified in the genus Boletus (L. carminipes, L. flavorubra, L. pseudosensibilis), as well as the newly described L. angustispora and L. asiatica. The erection of this genus follows recent molecular studies that outlined a new phylogenetic framework for the family Boletaceae. Zeng and Yang named the genus after Chinese naturalist Lan Mao (1397-1476).

== Species ==
Image	Name	Year	Distribution
	L. angustispora G. Wu & Zhu L. Yang	2015	China
	L. asiatica G. Wu & Zhu L. Yang	2015	China and The Philippines
	L. borealis Alan E. Bessette,	2016	United States
	L. carminipes (A.H.Sm. & Thiers) G.Wu, Halling & Zhu L.Yang	2015	United States
	L. flavorubra (Halling & M. Mata) G. Wu, Halling & Zhu L. Yang	2015	Costa Rica
	L. fragrans (Vittad.) Vizzini, Gelardi & Simonini	2015	Europe
	L. macrocarpa N.K. Zeng, H. Chai & S. Jiang	2019	China
	L. pallidorosea (Both) Raspé & Vadthanarat	2019	United States
	L. pseudosensibilis (A.H. Sm. & Thiers) G. Wu, Halling & Zhu L. Yang	2015	United States
	L. roseocrispans Bessette, A.R. Bessette, Nuhn & Halling	2015	United States
	L. rubriceps N.K. Zeng & Hui Chai	2018	China
	L. sublurida (Murrill) A. Farid & A.R. Franck	2021	United States

== See also ==
- Hallucinogenic bolete mushroom
