= Peduncular hallucinosis =

Neurological disorder

- Other names: Lhermitte's peduncular hallucinosis
- Specialty: Neurology, Psychiatry
- Symptoms: Visual hallucinations typically occurring in dark environments, sleep disturbances
- Causes: Vascular and infectious midbrain, pontine and thalamic lesions, local subarachnoid hemorrhage, compression by tumors, basilar migraine, basilar vascular hypoplasia, following regional surgical or angiographic interventions

Peduncular hallucinosis (PH) is a rare neurological disorder that causes vivid visual hallucinations that typically occur in dark environments and last for several minutes. Unlike some other kinds of hallucinations, the hallucinations that patients with PH experience are very realistic, and often involve people and environments that are familiar to the affected individuals. Because the content of the hallucinations is never exceptionally bizarre, patients can rarely distinguish between the hallucinations and reality.

In 1922, the French neurologist Jean Lhermitte documented the case of a patient who was experiencing visual hallucinations that were suggestive of localized damage to the midbrain and pons. After other similar case studies were published, this syndrome was labeled "peduncular hallucinosis".

The accumulation of additional cases by Lhermitte and by others influenced academic medical debate about hallucinations and about behavioral neurology. Lhermitte provided a full account of his work in this area in his book "Les hallucinations: clinique et physiopathologie", which was published in Paris in 1951 by Doin publishing. Contemporary researchers, with access to new technologies in medical brain imaging, have confirmed the brain localization of these unusual hallucinations.

== Signs and symptoms ==
The hallucinations are normally colorful, vivid images that occur during wakefulness, predominantly at night. Lilliputian hallucinations, hallucinations in which people or animals appear smaller than they would be in real life, are common in cases of peduncular hallucinosis. Most patients exhibit abnormal sleep patterns characterized by insomnia and daytime drowsiness. Peduncular hallucinosis has been described as a "release phenomenon" due to damage to the ascending reticular activating system, which is supported by the sleep disturbance characteristic of this syndrome. Patients can experience agitation and delusion and mistake their hallucinations for reality.

== Cause ==
Peduncular hallucinosis is attributed to a range of various pathologies such as vascular and infectious midbrain, pontine and thalamic lesions, local subarachnoid hemorrhage, compression by tumors, basilar migraine, basilar vascular hypoplasia, and following regional surgical or angiographic interventions. These pathologies are mainly near the base of the brain and the hallucinations have gone away in patients that had their pathology corrected such as the removal of a tumor. The most commonly reported hallucinations are animals, people of any age, scary or deformed faces and heads, landscapes, or people walking in a line.

=== Lesions ===
The lesions that disturb brainstem reticular formation or thalamic targets seem to be the source behind peduncular hallucinosis. For example, lesions affecting the dorsal raphe system can lead to hallucinations by preventing ascending inhibition to the dorsal lateral geniculate nucleus (LGN). This inhibition may hyper-excite the LGN, inducing visual hallucinations. Lesions of the retina and areas proximal to it can remove or alter the inputs coming in from the external environment to the visual system. Peduncular hallucinosis therefore might emanate from disturbances in distal portions of the visual system. Lesions in the frontal and temporal lobes can also lead to complex visual hallucinations because the lobes connect to the visual system via the lateral geniculate nucleus and medial pulvinar. In addition, visual processing and salience can be disrupted by thalamic lesions which affect important structures such as the pulvinar.

The effect lesions on the brainstem have on the ascending reticular activating system (ARAS) has also been hypothesized. It was proposed that since the ARAS plays a role in consciousness and waking, the lesions of the brainstem common to peduncular hallucinosis may "disrupt ARAS impulses from the brainstem reticular formation" and, as a consequence, lead to the sleep disturbances characteristic of peduncular hallucinosis. The use of drugs such as olanzapine may help treat sleep disturbances as it has been found to "improve sleep continuity, sleep quality, and [to] increase slow wave sleep."

=== Correlation between other diseases ===
People diagnosed with Parkinson's disease, narcolepsy, delirium tremens, Lewy body dementia, and temporal lobe epilepsy are more prone to complex visual hallucinations such as peduncular hallucinosis. Peduncular hallucinosis is more common in patients with a long duration of Parkinson's disease and also with a long treatment history, depression, and cognitive impairment. Paranoid delusions are common in these patients even though the hallucinations can occur during clear sensorium.

=== Differences from other visual hallucinations ===
Other visual hallucinations tend to stem from psychological disorders. Whereas a person with a psychological disorder thinks their hallucinations are real, people with peduncular hallucinosis normally know that the visual hallucinations they see are not real. Peduncular hallucinations are independent of seizures, unlike some other visual hallucinations.

== Treatment ==
Treatment of any kind of complex visual hallucination requires an understanding of the different pathologies in order to correctly diagnose and treat. Sometimes improvement will occur spontaneously and pharmacotherapy is not necessary. While there is not a lot of evidence of effective pharmacological treatment, antipsychotics and anticonvulsants have been used in some cases to control hallucinations. Since peduncular hallucinosis occurs due to an excess of serotonin, modern antipsychotics are used to block both dopamine and serotonin receptors, preventing the overstimulation of the lateral geniculate nucleus (LGN). Carbamazepine increases GABA, which prevents the LGN from firing, thereby increasing the inhibition of the LGN. Regular antipsychotics as well as antidepressants can also be helpful in reducing or eliminating peduncular hallucinosis.

More invasive treatments include corrective surgery such as cataract surgery, laser photocoagulation of the retina, and use of optical correcting devices. Tumor removal can also help to relieve compression in the brain, which can decrease or eliminate peduncular hallucinosis. Some hallucinations may be due to underlying cardiovascular disease, so in these cases the appropriate treatment includes control of hypertension and diabetes. As described, the type of treatment varies widely depending on the causation behind the complex visual hallucinations.

== History ==
The first documented case of peduncular hallucinosis was by French neurologist and neuropsychiatrist Jean Lhermitte, which described a 72-year-old woman's visual hallucinations. The hallucinations occurred during normal conscious state and the patient's neurological signs were associated with those characteristic of an infarct to the midbrain and pons. Von Bogaert, Lhermitte’s colleague, named this type of hallucination "peduncular", in reference to the cerebral peduncles, as well as to the midbrain and its surroundings. In 1925, Von Bogaert was the first to describe the pathophysiology of peduncular hallucinosis through an autopsy of a patient. His autopsy revealed the infarction of many areas of the brain including the inferolateral red nucleus, superior colliculus, periaqueductal gray, third nerve nucleus, superior cerebellar peduncle, substantia nigra, and pulvinar. Later in 1932, Lhermitte, Levy, and Trelles discovered an association between peduncular hallucinosis and "pigmentary degeneration of the periaqueductal gray and the degeneration of the occulomotor nucleus." Posterior thalamic lesions were also found to be linked to peduncular hallucinosis by De Morsier. More recently, magnetic resonance imaging (MRI) has been used to localize lesions in the brain characteristic of peduncular hallucinosis. In 1987, the first case of peduncular hallucinosis was reported in which MRI was used to locate a midbrain lesion.
