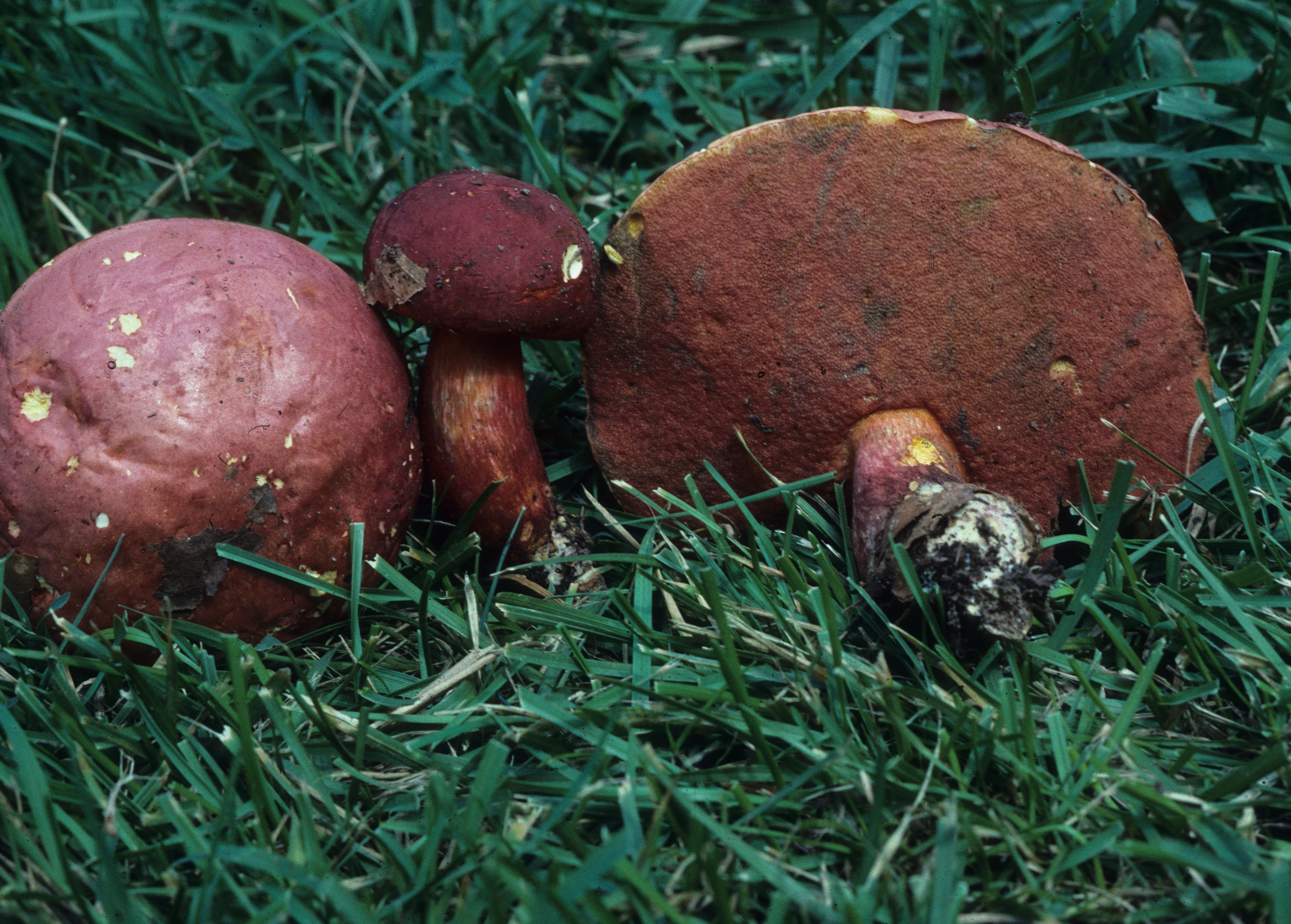

Scientific classification
- Domain: Eukaryota
- Kingdom: Fungi
- Division: Basidiomycota
- Class: Agaricomycetes
- Order: Boletales
- Family: Boletaceae
- Genus: Lanmaoa
- Species: L. borealis

Binomial name
- Lanmaoa borealis (A.H. Sm. & Thiers) A.E. Bessette, M.E. Nuhn & R.E. Halling

= Lanmaoa borealis =

Species of fungus

Lanmaoa borealis is a species of fungus that is commonly found in Michigan.

== Description ==
It has a yellow or pale yellow stipe that is blue on the top and at the base it is reddish-brown.
