= Fungal tubes =

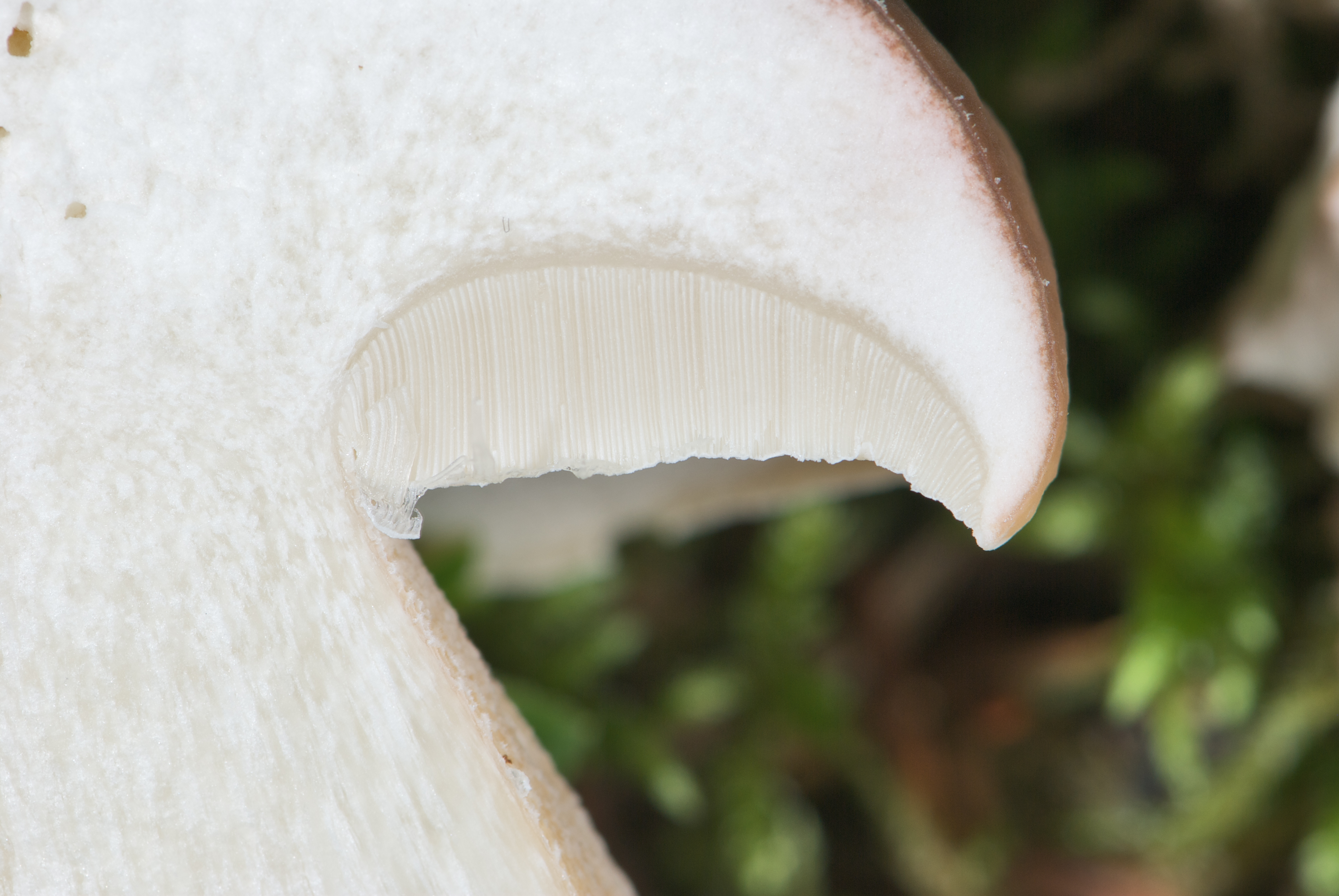
Tubes on cross-section of Boletus edulis

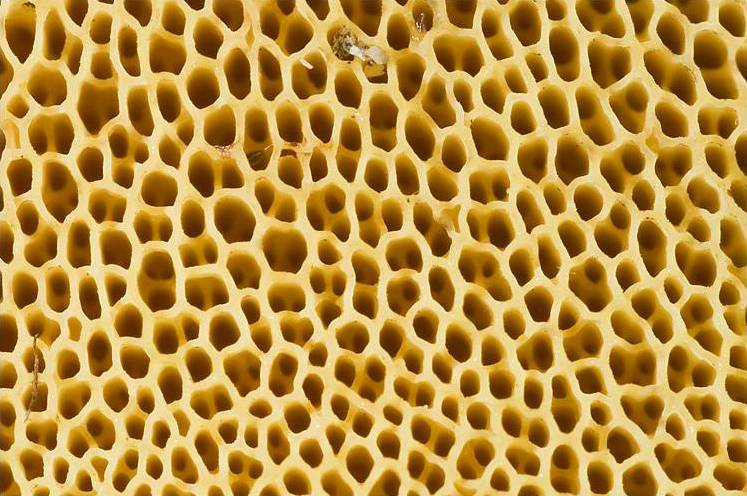
Pores of the bolete mushroom Suillus bovinus

Fungal tubes (pores) are a type of mushroom hymenium structure, distinguishing bolete mushrooms from e.g. lamellar mushrooms.
