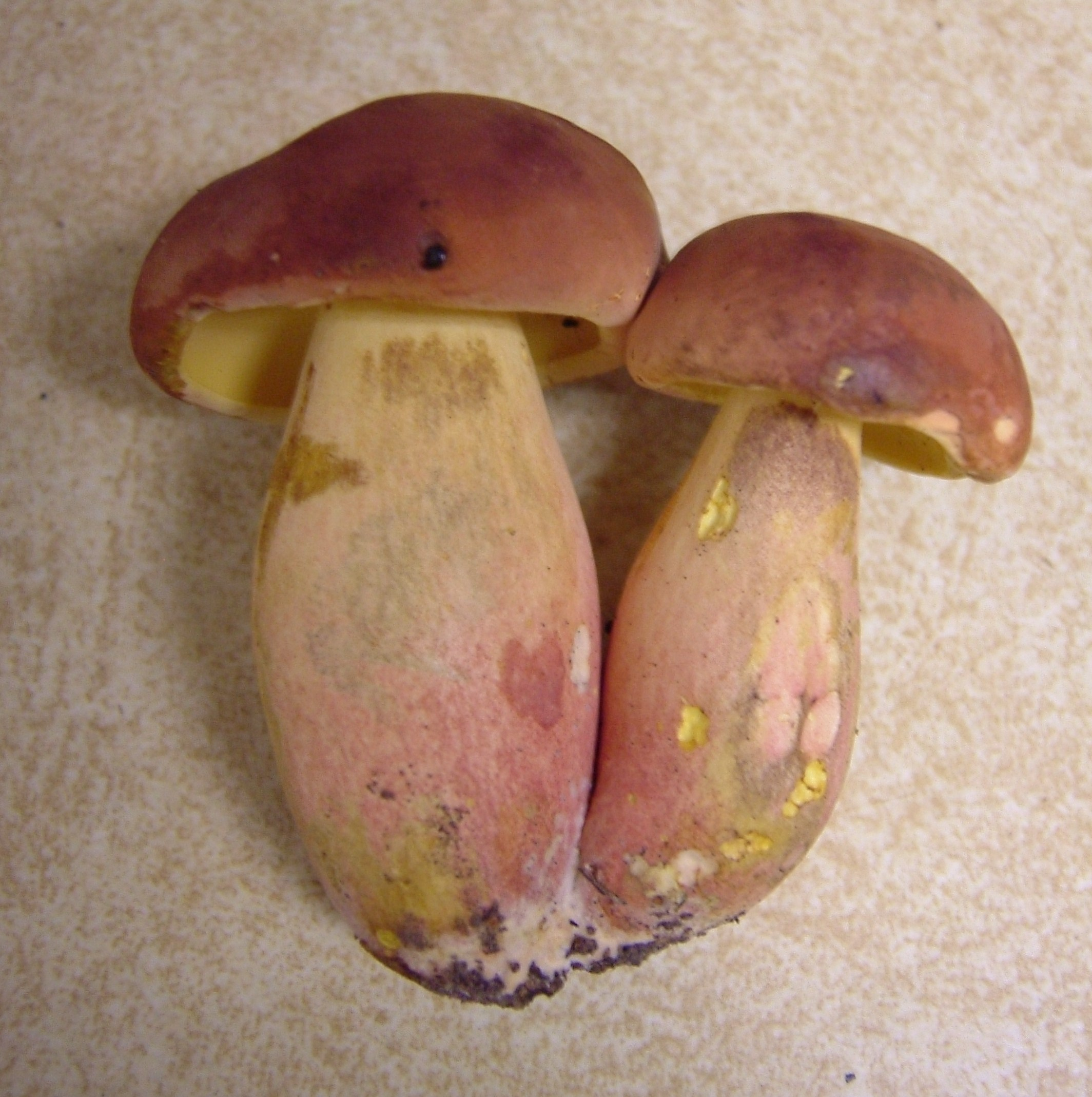

Scientific classification
- Kingdom: Fungi
- Division: Basidiomycota
- Class: Agaricomycetes
- Order: Boletales
- Family: Boletaceae
- Genus: Lanmaoa
- Species: L. pseudosensibilis

Binomial name
- Lanmaoa pseudosensibilis (A.H.Sm. & Thiers) G.Wu, Halling & Zhu L.Yang (2015)

Synonyms
- Boletus pseudosensibilis A.H.Sm. & Thiers (1971)

= Lanmaoa pseudosensibilis =

Species of fungus

Lanmaoa pseudosensibilis is a fungus of the family Boletaceae. First described officially in 1971 by mycologists Alexander H. Smith and Harry Delbert Thiers, it was transferred to the newly circumscribed genus Lanmaoa in 2015.

The yellowish to peachy cap is 4–15 centimetres (1 1/2–6 in) wide. The stem is 5–10 cm (2–4 in) tall and 1–2.5 cm (1/2–1 in). The flesh is yellow and can stain blue.

From July to September, it can be found in eastern North America under hardwood trees, mostly oak.

It is edible if thoroughly boiled or cooked.

== See also ==
- List of North American boletes
