= Thermolabile protecting groups =

Thermolabile Protecting Groups (TPGs) are applied in chemical synthesis when mild deprotection conditions are required. Their removal merely consists of increasing temperature, which leads to deprotection of the protected sensitive part of a molecule.

The deprotection mechanism has been proven only for several Thermolabile Protecting Groups (TPGs). Most of these groups are removed on the basis of intramolecular cyclization depending either on nucleophilicity or configuration. TPGs are characterized by a different half-life after increasing temperature by 70 °C. The shortest deprotection time with high stability in lower temperatures has been found for 2-pyridyl TPGs that are applied to protect a hydroxyl group, carboxylic acid or a phosphate esters. For these groups stabilization systems have been developed depending on the protected part of a molecule: for a phosphate centre it is the "click-clack" approach, and for a hydroxyl group – the "chemical switch" concept.

TPGs are applied as an element that increases the specificity of starters in PCR; they may also be used in microarray construction.
