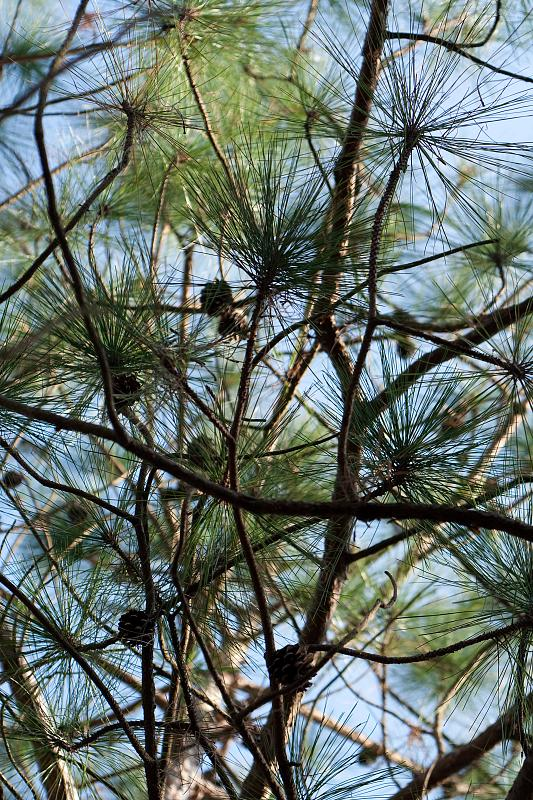

Conservation status
- Least Concern (IUCN 3.1)

Scientific classification
- Kingdom: Plantae
- Clade: Tracheophytes
- Clade: Gymnosperms
- Division: Pinophyta
- Class: Pinopsida
- Order: Pinales
- Family: Pinaceae
- Genus: Pinus
- Subgenus: P. subg. Pinus
- Section: P. sect. Pinus
- Subsection: P. subsect. Pinus
- Species: P. yunnanensis

Binomial name
- Pinus yunnanensis Franch.

= Pinus yunnanensis =

Species of conifer

Pinus yunnanensis, the Yunnan pine, is a species of conifer in the family Pinaceae. A pine, It is found in the Chinese provinces of Yunnan, Sichuan, Guizhou, and Guangxi.

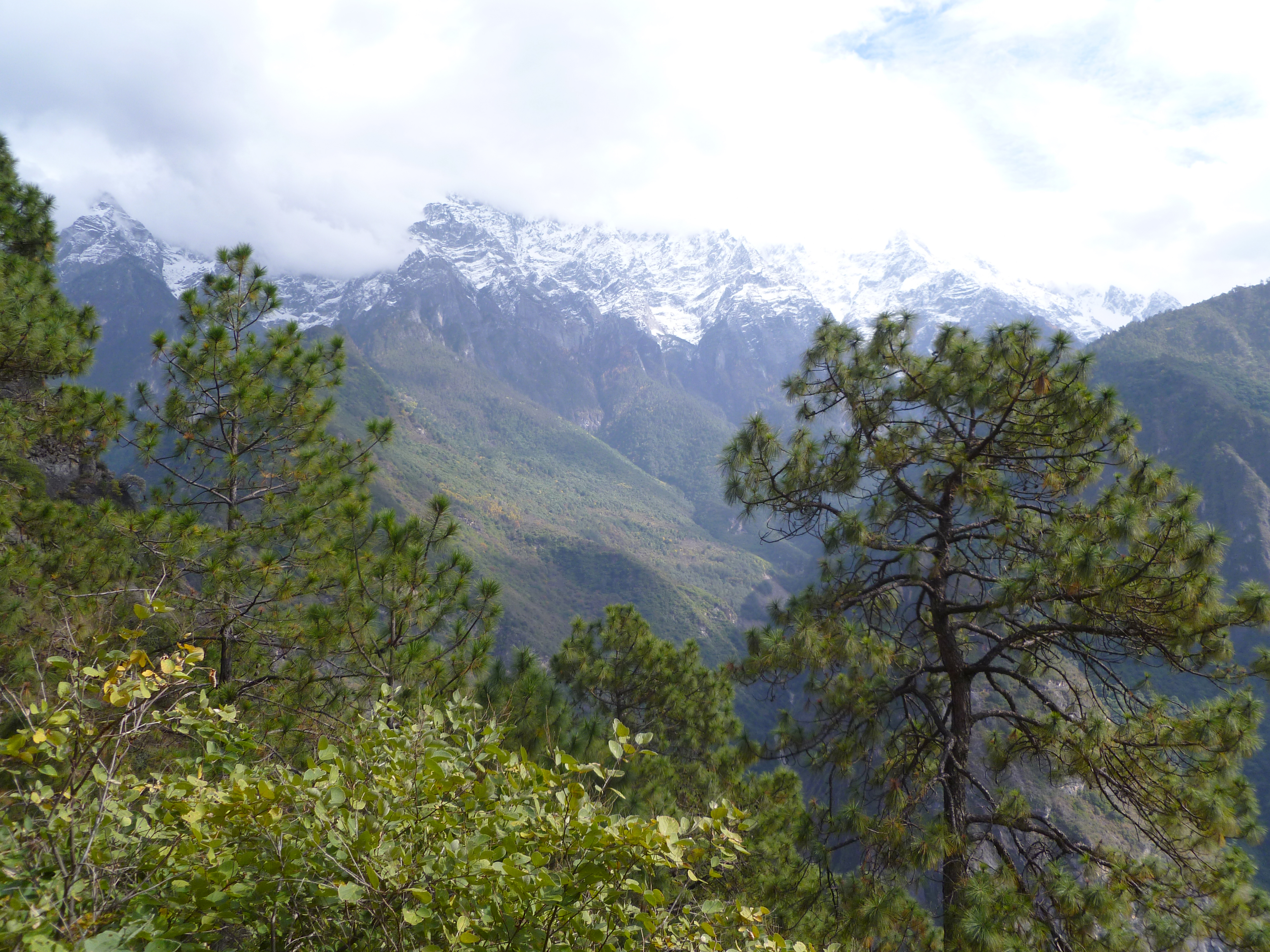
Yunnan pines near Jade Dragon Snow Mountain, Lijiang, Yunnan

== Description ==
Pinus yunnanensis can grow up to 30 m (98 feet) in height and 1 m (3 ft 3in) in trunk diameter when mature. The bark is rough when young, becoming scaly, fissured, and longitudinally fissured with age; gray-brown weathering to gray. The habit of a mature tree is a single, sometimes forked trunk, with spreading or down curving branches forming a domed or flat-topped crown.

== See also ==
- Lanmaoa asiatica
