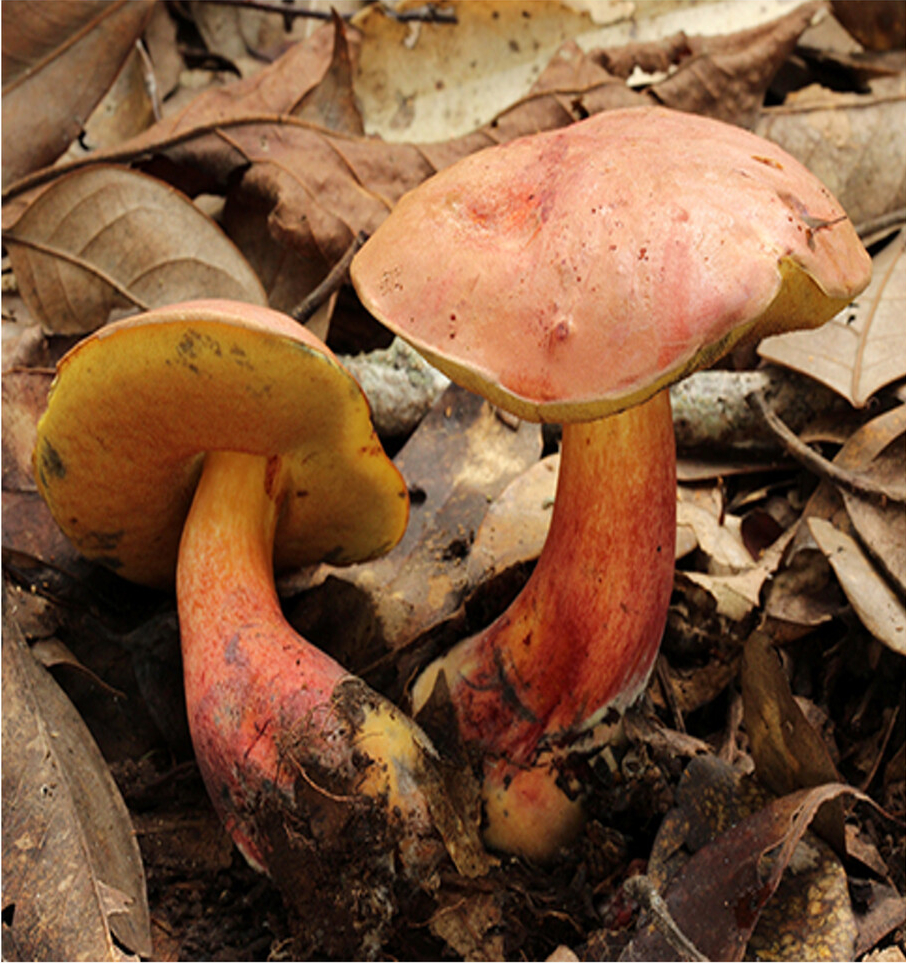

Scientific classification
- Kingdom: Fungi
- Division: Basidiomycota
- Class: Agaricomycetes
- Order: Boletales
- Family: Boletaceae
- Genus: Lanmaoa
- Species: L. asiatica

Binomial name
- Lanmaoa asiatica G.Wu & Zhu L.Yang (2015)

= Lanmaoa asiatica =

Species of fungus

Lanmaoa asiatica
- Mycological characteristics
- Pores on hymenium
- Cap is convex
- Hymenium is adnate
- Stipe is bare
- Spore print is olive-brown
- Ecology is mycorrhizal
- Edibility is psychoactive or choice

Lanmaoa asiatica is a species of bolete mushroom of the family Boletaceae. It is reddish in color and an ectomycorrhizal symbiote of Pinus yunnanensis. It is a type of hallucinogenic bolete mushroom and is notable for causing lilliputian hallucinations when eaten raw or undercooked.

== Range ==
The mushroom is found in Yunnan province (China) and the Cordillera Administrative Region (Philippines), where it is known as Jianshouqing (Chinese: 见手青; pinyin: Jiànshǒuqīng; lit. 'see-hand-blue', as the flesh oxidizes to a blue color when crushed) (Note: Jiànshǒuqīng is a name broadly applied to boletes that turn blue on exposure to air. The academic name for this mushroom in Chinese is 兰茂牛肝菌 "Lan Mao's bolete", after Lan Mao, the namesake of the genus Lanmaoa.) and Sedesdem respectively. There have also been reports of "mushroom madness" caused by a mushroom called nonda in Papua New Guinea, though Lanmaoa species do not inhabit that country. Lanmaoa asiatica is mycorrhizal with Pinus and thus must be collected from the wild.

== Biochemistry and psychoactivity ==
The bluing reaction observed when the flesh is bruised or cut is strictly due to a pigment being enzymatically oxidized and is unrelated to the bluing reaction observed in psilocybin-containing mushrooms (caused by an oxidized dimer of psilocin), as L. asiatica has not been shown to produce psilocybin or psilocin.

Lanmaoa asiatica produces Lilliputian hallucinations, in which a person sees numerous extremely small yet fully autonomous people in their environment. Reports of Lilliputian hallucinations across several Asian countries had previously been unexplained for many years. In one Yunnan hospital, doctors treat hundreds of such cases a year that often manifest as visions of tiny elves going under doors, climbing the furniture, and scaling walls.

Lanmaoa asiatica is considered a choice wild edible in China and is rich in umami flavor compounds. It is safe to eat when properly cooked. "At a mushroom hot pot restaurant there, the server set a timer for 15 minutes and warned us, 'Don't eat it until the timer goes off or you might see little people,'" says Colin Domnauer, a PhD student who studies L. asiatica. Yunnanese restaurants have developed a set of safety standards (including mandatory electronic cooking timers and a ban on consuming alcoholic drinks) to minimize poisoning risk, with some establishments going further to make sure to always save samples of the day's mushrooms for genetic analysis should a poisoning outbreak occur. The local government also sends public alerts during mushroom season to warn about the potential of poisonings. Nevertheless, poisonings remain common and treatment thereof is a specialty of local hospitals.

Lilliputian hallucinations have been documented as arising from many different disease states, including alcohol withdrawal, macular degeneration, and Charles Bonnet syndrome, among many others. However, no disease can induce Lilliputian hallucinations as reliably as raw Lanmaoa asiatica. The hallucinations with Lanmaoa asiatica have a peculiar time course, with an onset of 12 to 24 hours after the meal and a duration of 1 to 7 days or in some cases weeks. The little people with Lanmaoa asiatica are said to be about 2 cm or 10 to 30 cm tall and anchored in one's environment, including being stable, realistically embedded in the environment, three-dimensional, rendered in fine detail, and generally obey the laws of physics. One example is little people submerging themselves in a soup, resurfacing, and then being lifted out in a spoon. Nothing else is said to be known that produces anchored Lilliputian hallucinations like Lanmaoa asiatica. Due to the delayed onset, it has been hypothesized that the active constituent might be a prodrug or that it might act by altering the gut somehow. People who are hallucinating on Lanmaoa asiatica are usually aware that they are quite intoxicated. In addition to the Lilliputian hallucinations, Lanmaoa asiatica can produce gastrointestinal symptoms and alarmingly, occasional states of delirium. People appear to recover fully from the intoxication, and no deaths have been reported.

Chemical and genomic analyses indicate that L. asiatica does not contain the known hallucinogenic alkaloids psilocybin and muscimol, suggesting that an unknown hallucinogenic compound or mixture of compounds is involved. Chemical analysis of L. asiatica has identified numerous compounds with possible pharmacological activity, but as of yet, none are linked to the effects.

== History ==
Lanmaoa asiatica and the syndrome it induces may have been described as early as the third century by a Daoist in China. Bolete mushrooms producing Lilliputian hallucinations were observed and described in Papua New Guinea from the 1930s to the 1960s. The phenomenon of undercooked Chinese boletes causing Lilliputian hallucinations was subsequently brought to North American attention by David Arora and others in the 1990s. Domnauer and colleagues identified the famous Chinese hallucinogenic species as L. asiatica and described these results in 2025. They also found L. asiatica alongside reports of Lilliputian hallucinations in the Philippines and described these findings as well.

== Society and culture ==
=== Notable cases ===
In 2023, L. asiatica received international media attention after U.S. Treasury Secretary Janet Yellen was reported to have eaten a dinner that contained the fungus during an official visit to China. Yellen later stated that the mushrooms in the dinner were thoroughly cooked, and that she experienced no adverse effects.

== See also ==
- Rubroboletus sinicus
