= Visual hallucination =

Hallucinations primarily involving the sense of sight

A visual hallucination is a vivid visual experience occurring without corresponding external stimuli in an awake state. These experiences are involuntary and possess a degree of perceived reality sufficient to resemble authentic visual perception. Unlike illusions, which involve the misinterpretation of actual external stimuli, visual hallucinations are entirely independent of external visual input. They may include fully formed images, such as human figures or scenes, angelic figures, or unformed phenomena, like flashes of light or geometric patterns.

Visual hallucinations are not restricted to the transitional states of awakening or falling asleep and are a hallmark of various neurological and psychiatric conditions. They are documented in schizophrenia, toxic encephalopathies, migraines, substance withdrawal syndromes, focal central nervous system lesions, and psychotic mood disorders. Although traditionally linked with organic aetiologies, visual hallucinations occur in approximately 25% to 50% of individuals with schizophrenia. In such cases, they frequently co-occur with auditory hallucinations, though they may also manifest independently.

Approximately one-third of individuals with psychotic disorders experience visual hallucinations. Despite their prevalence, the underlying mechanisms remain poorly understood, which hinders the development of targeted therapeutic approaches.

== Presentation ==
Visual hallucinations in psychosis are reported to have physical properties similar to real perceptions. They are often life-sized, detailed, and solid, and are projected into the external world. They typically appear anchored in external space, just beyond the reach of individuals, or further away. They can have three-dimensional shapes, with depth and shadows, and distinct edges. They can be colorful or in black and white and can be static or have movement.

== Conditions ==
The Diagnostic and Statistical Manual of Mental Disorders (DSM-5) identifies hallucinations as a critical diagnostic criterion for psychotic disorders, including schizophrenia and schizoaffective disorder. Conditions causing complex visual hallucinations include schizophrenia, Charles Bonnet syndrome, migraine coma, treated idiopathic Parkinson's disease, epilepsy, narcolepsy-cataplexy syndrome, Lewy body dementia without treatment, peduncular hallucinosis, and hallucinogen-induced states.

In delirium, visual hallucinations are the most common type. Stimulant intoxication (e.g., cocaine or methamphetamine) is frequently accompanied by visual hallucinations, which may involve perceptions of crawling insects due to associated tactile disturbances. Visual hallucinations are also linked to migraine headaches, presenting as classic auras or less common manifestations like migraine coma and familial hemiplegic migraine. Peduncular hallucinosis involves visual hallucinations following a midbrain infarct. In dementia with Lewy bodies, visual hallucinations feature objects appearing to move when they are still, as well as complex scenes involving people and inanimate objects that do not exist. Charles Bonnet syndrome is characterized by visual hallucinations in visually impaired individuals, often depicting clear and detailed images of people, faces, animals, and objects.

=== Simple vs. complex ===
Visual hallucinations may be simple/non-formed visual hallucinations, or complex/formed visual hallucinations.

Simple visual hallucinations without structure are known as phosphenes and those with geometric structure are known as photopsias. These hallucinations are caused by irritation to the primary visual cortex (Brodmann's area 17).

Sometimes, hallucinations are 'Lilliputian', i.e., patients experience visual hallucinations where there are miniature people, often undertaking unusual actions. Lilliputian hallucinations may be accompanied by wonder, rather than terror.

Most people have multiple VH types. Complex VH were most prevalent, mainly consisting of people and animals, followed by simple, then geometric VH. Few patients experienced only simple VH.

=== Content ===
The frequency of hallucinations varies widely from rare to frequent, as does duration (seconds to minutes). It is common that the visual hallucinations typically occurred daily, for a few minutes per episode. The content of hallucinations varies as well. Preliminary research has found that most individuals had multiple types of visual hallucinations. Scenes involving people and/or animals were the most common, followed by simple geometric images.

Complex (formed) visual hallucinations are more common than Simple (non-formed) visual hallucinations. In contrast to hallucinations experienced in organic conditions, hallucinations experienced as symptoms of psychoses tend to be more frightening. An example of this would be hallucinations that have imagery of bugs, dogs, snakes, distorted faces. Visual hallucinations may also be present in those with Parkinson's, where visions of dead individuals can be present. In psychoses, this is relatively rare, although visions of God, angels, the devil, saints, and fairies are common. Individuals often report being surprised when hallucinations occur and are generally helpless to change or stop them. In general, individuals believe that visions are experienced only by themselves.

== Primary visual cortex ==
V1's functional connection with other brain regions is reduced in psychotic patients who experience visual hallucinations. This contrasts with the expectation that V1 would be active during conscious visual perception.

== Causes ==
Two neurotransmitters are particularly important in visual hallucinations – serotonin and acetylcholine. They are concentrated in the visual thalamic nuclei and visual cortex.

The similarity of visual hallucinations that stem from diverse conditions suggest a common pathway for visual hallucinations. Three pathophysiologic mechanisms are thought to explain this.

The first mechanism has to do with cortical centers responsible for visual processing. Irritation of visual association cortices (Brodmann's areas 18 and 19) cause complex visual hallucinations.

The second mechanism is deafferentation, the interruption or destruction of the afferent connections of nerve cells, of the visual system, caused by lesions, leading to the removal of normal inhibitory processes on cortical input to visual association areas, leading to complex hallucinations as a release phenomenon.

== Prevalence ==
Studies show that visual hallucinations are present in 16%–72% of patients with schizophrenia and schizoaffective disorder. In delirium, visual hallucinations have been observed in 27% of patients. Furthermore, visual hallucinations are reported in over 20% of individuals with dementia with Lewy bodies.

== See also ==
- Psychedelic replication
