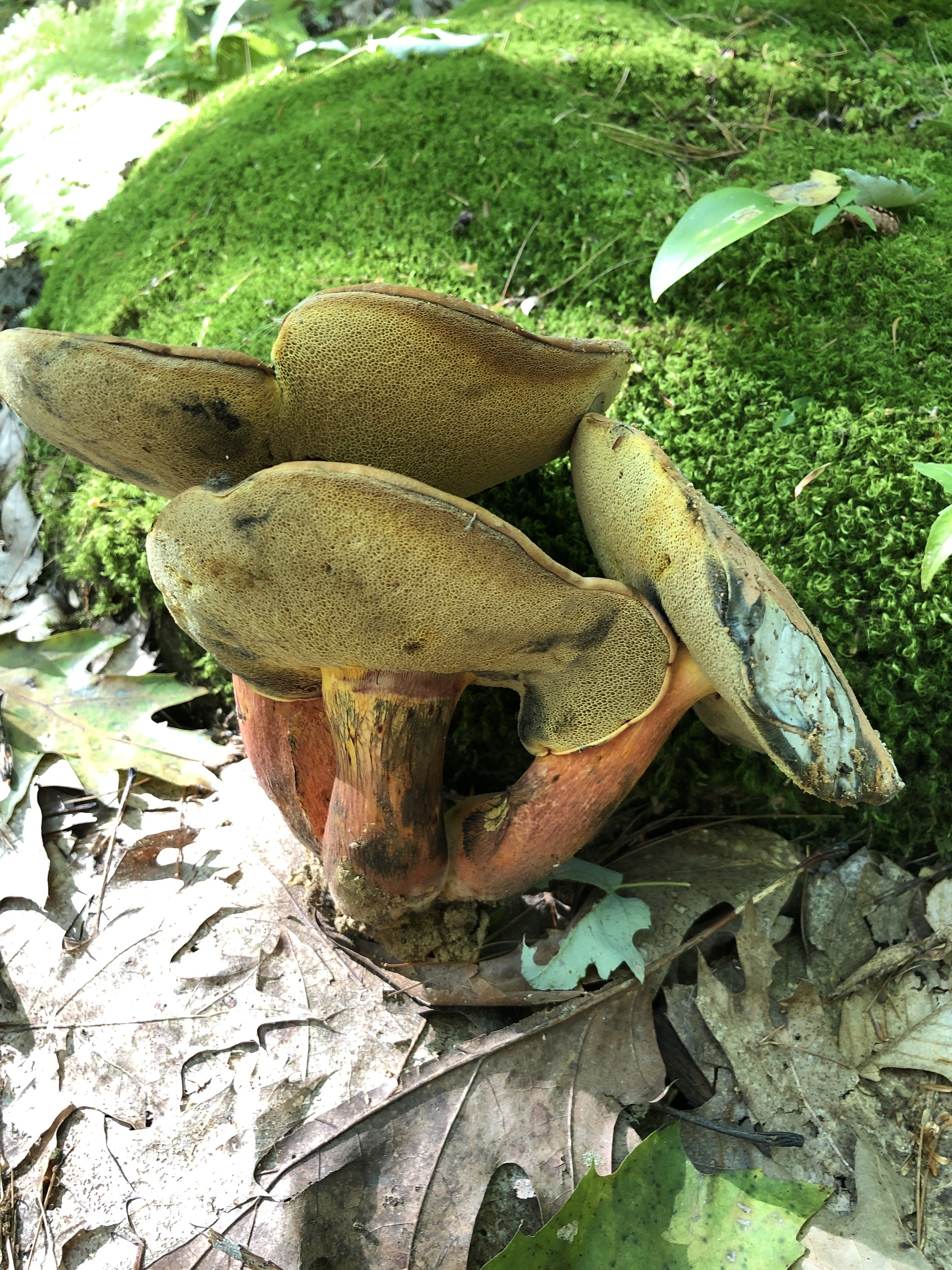

Scientific classification
- Domain: Eukaryota
- Kingdom: Fungi
- Division: Basidiomycota
- Class: Agaricomycetes
- Order: Boletales
- Family: Boletaceae
- Genus: Lanmaoa
- Species: L. carminipes

Binomial name
- Lanmaoa carminipes (A.H.Sm. & Thiers) G.Wu, Halling & Zhu L.Yang (2015)

Synonyms
- Boletus carminipes A.H.Sm. & Thiers (1971)

= Lanmaoa carminipes =

Species of fungus

Lanmaoa carminipes is a fungus of the family Boletaceae native to the United States. First described officially in 1971 by mycologists Alexander H. Smith and Harry Delbert Thiers as a species of Boletus, it was transferred to the newly circumscribed genus Lanmaoa in 2015.

== See also ==
- List of North American boletes
