= Lilliputian hallucination =

Hallucinations of small beings

Lilliputian hallucinations are hallucinations of small humans, animals, or fantasy entities. They are usually visual in nature, but are also often multimodal, and are almost always perceived as grounded in one's external environment. Lilliputian hallucinations can occur in conditions such as Alice in Wonderland syndrome, visual release hallucinations, peduncular hallucinosis, schizophrenia, and alcohol withdrawal, among others.

They have also been reported to be induced rarely by drugs such as amantadine and trichloroethylene and are known to be induced by hallucinogenic bolete mushrooms ("xiao ren ren" mushrooms) such as Lanmaoa asiatica. They may also sometimes be induced by classical serotonergic psychedelics such as mescaline and dimethyltryptamine (DMT), as well as by Amanita muscaria mushrooms.
