= Bolete =

Type of fungal fruiting body

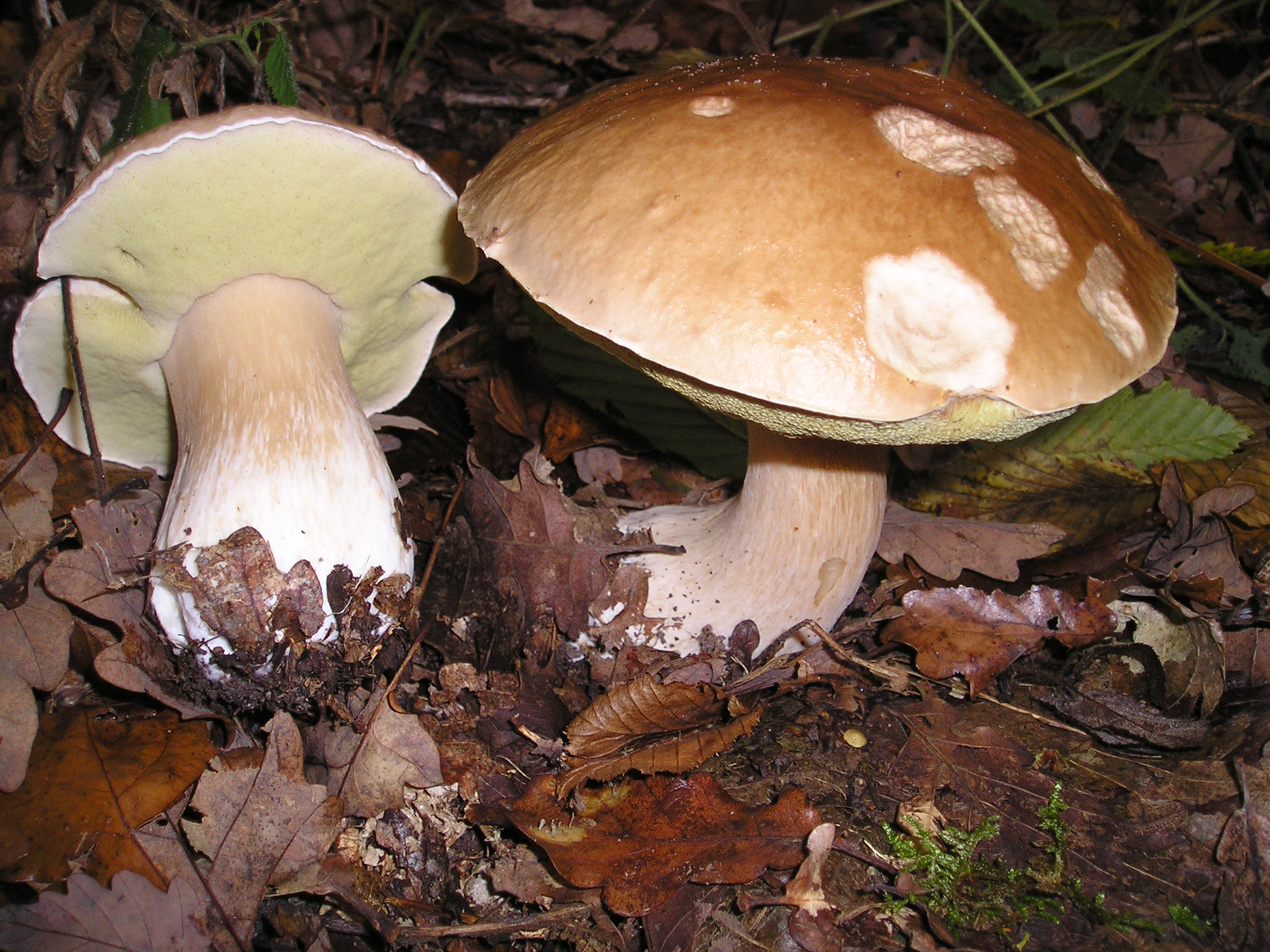
The porcini, Boletus edulis, showing the solid looking, spongy bottom surface, which is the defining characteristic of boletes.

A bolete is a type of mushroom, or fungal fruiting body. It can be identified due to its unique cap. On the underside of the cap there is usually a spongy surface with pores, instead of the gills typical of mushrooms. A similar pore surface is found in polypores, but these species generally have a different physical structure from boletes, and have different microscopic characteristics than boletes. Many polypores have much firmer, often woody, flesh.

"Bolete" is the English common name for fungus species with caps that have this appearance.

Some, but not all boletes bruise blue.

== Taxonomy ==
The boletes are classified in the order Boletales. However, not all members of the order Boletales are boletes. The micromorphology and molecular phylogeny of the order Boletales have established that it also contains many gilled, puffball, and other fruit body shapes. Examples of these fungi include Chroogomphus, Gomphidius, Phylloporus, Paxillus, Tapinella, Hygrophoropsis, and Scleroderma.

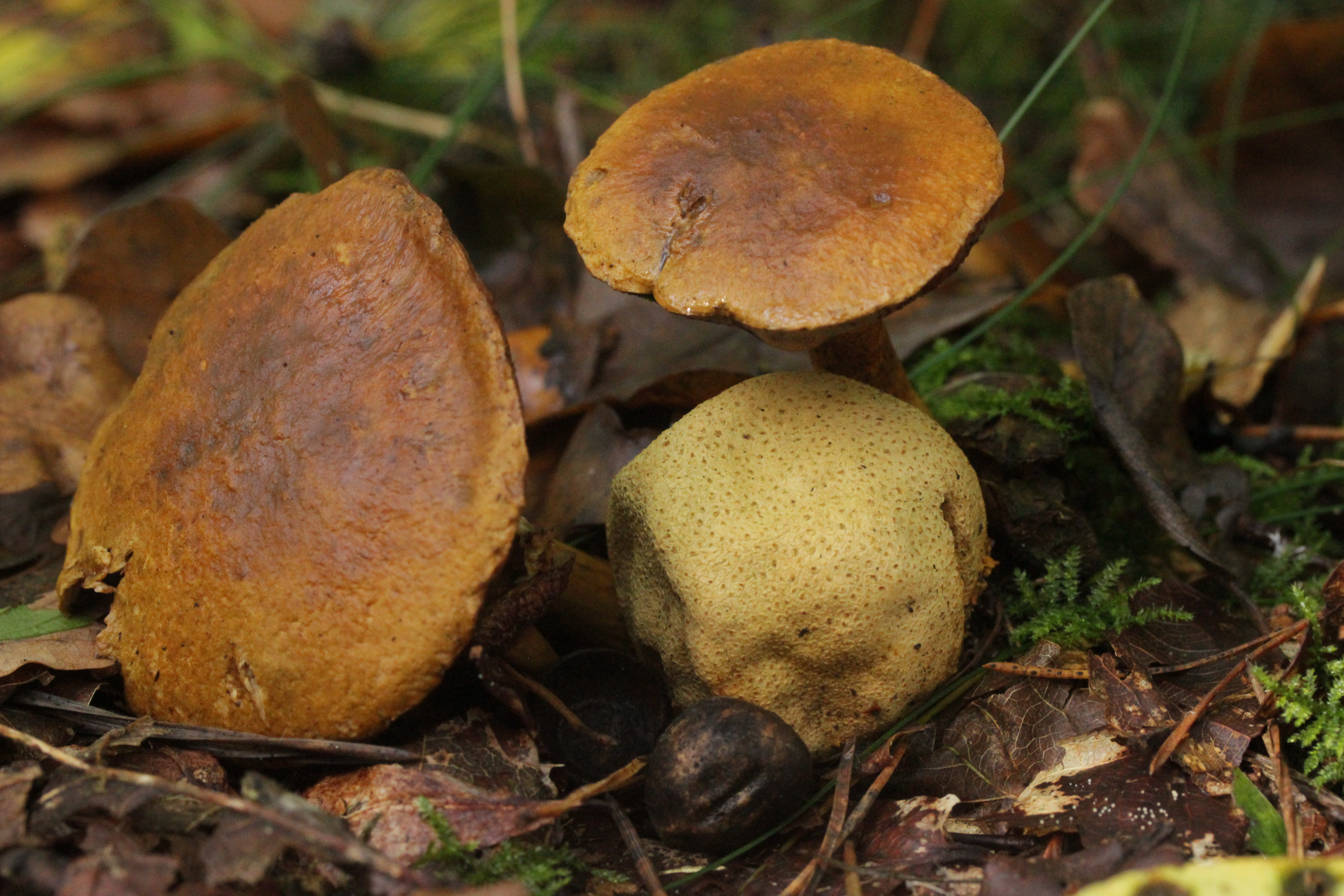
Pseudoboletus parasiticus is a parasite to Scleroderma citrinum.

The genus Boletus was originally broadly defined and described by Carl Linnaeus in 1753, containing all pored mushrooms. Since then, gradually other genera have been defined, such as Tylopilus by Karsten in 1881, and old names such as Leccinum and Suillus resurrected or redefined.

Recently, the genus Boletus has been split up even more, creating new genera, such as Xerocomellus and Caloboletus.

== Ecology ==
Most boletes are mycorrhizal and are generally found in woodlands. There is also a parasitic bolete, Pseudoboletus parasiticus, which grows on Scleroderma citrinum. Another parasitic bolete is Buchwaldoboletus lignicola, which is a parasite to Phaeolus schweinitzii, the dyer's polypore.

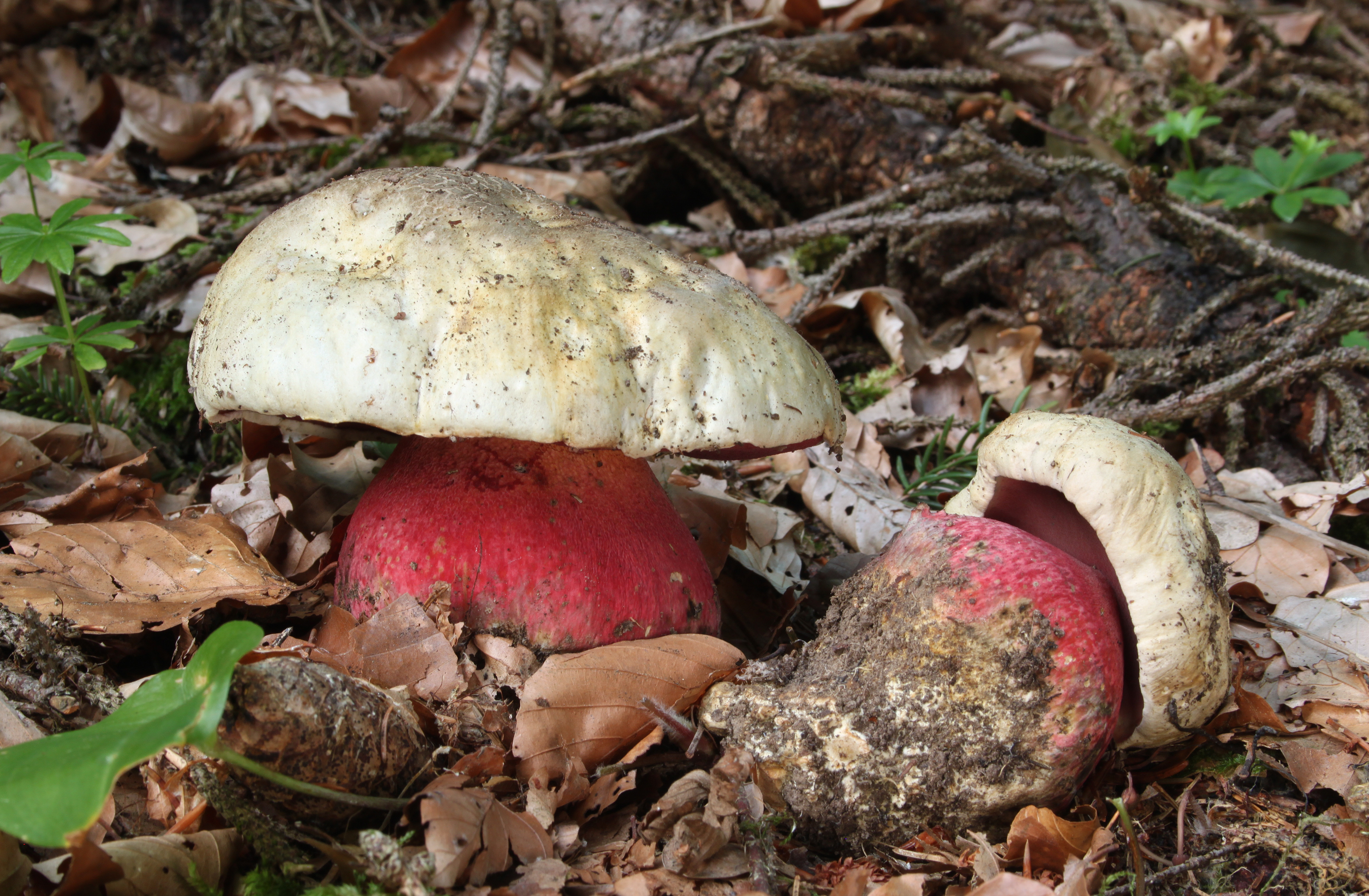
Satan's bolete (Rubroboletus satanas) is a very poisonous mushroom.

Boletes are susceptible to infection by the fungus Hypomyces chrysospermus, also known as the bolete eater.

== Edibility ==
Many boletes, such as the porcini (Boletus edulis), are edible and considered a delicacy. However, other boletes, such as many Suillus and Xerocomellus are considered edible, but not choice. Some boletes, such as Caloboletus and Tylopilus are too bitter to eat. Other boletes, such as ones in the Rubroboletus genus, such as Satan's bolete (Rubroboletus satanas) are dangerously poisonous. Most poisonous boletes have red pores. Some boletes appear to be hallucinogenic. One such bolete is Boletus manicus.

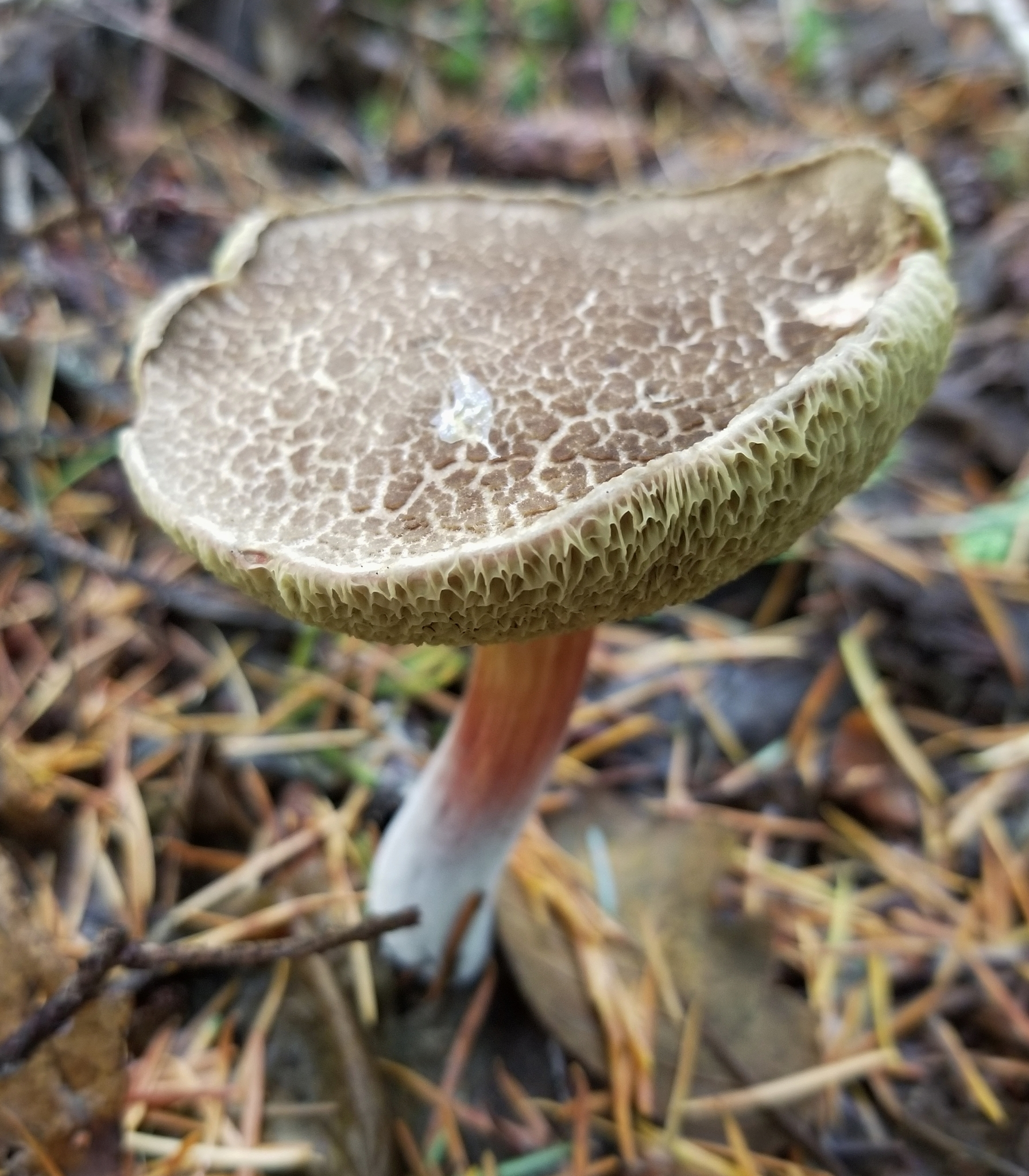
Xerocomellus diffractus is edible, but not highly prized.
