= List of Boletus species =

The following is an incomplete list of species of the mushroom genus Boletus. The genus has a widespread distribution and contains about 300 species. However, the genus is polyphyletic, and approximately only 10 percent of the described species are actually members of the Boletus sensu stricto clade (Singer's Boletus section Boletus, also known as the "Porcini Clade").

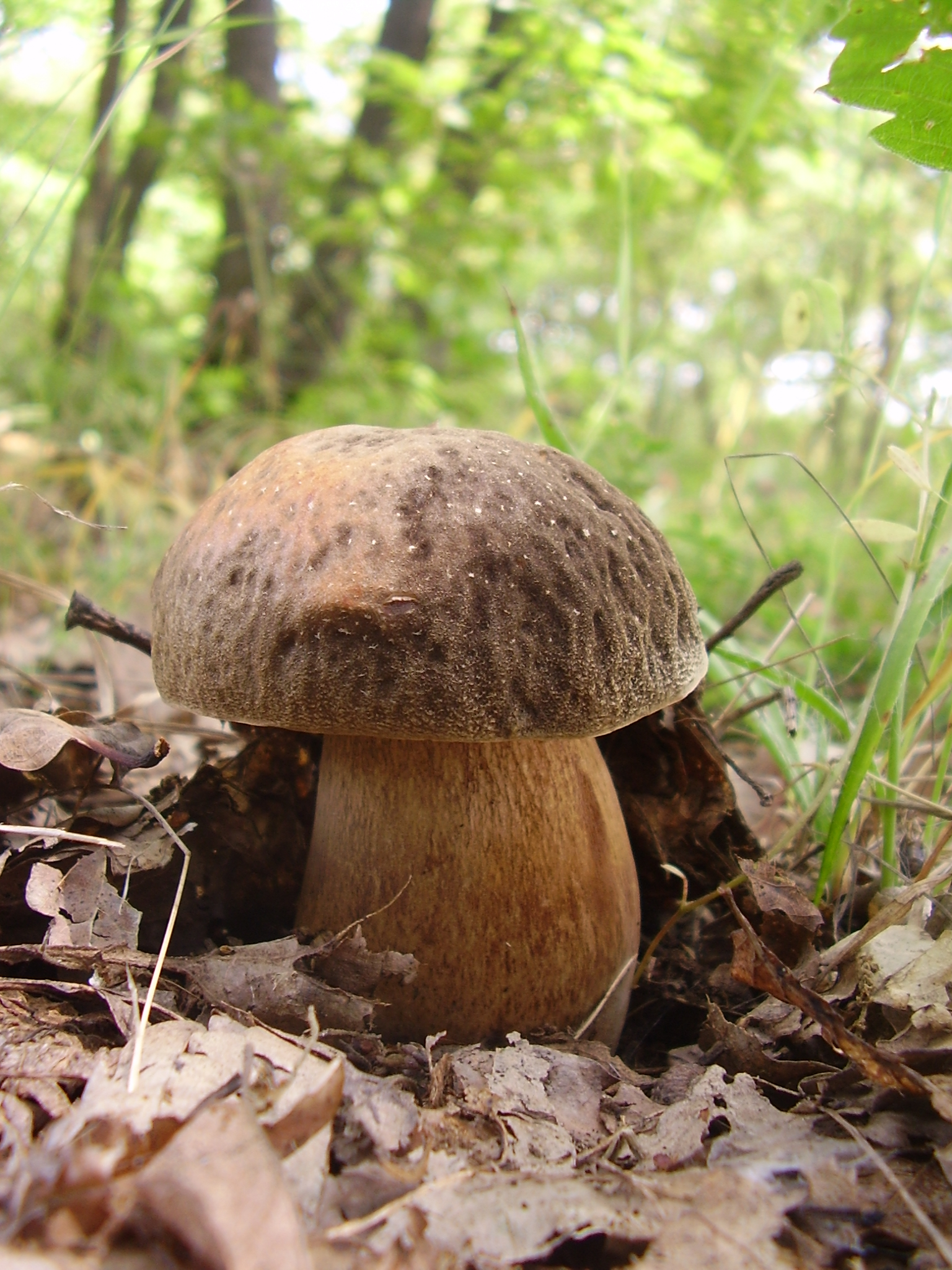
Boletus aereus Bull. 1789

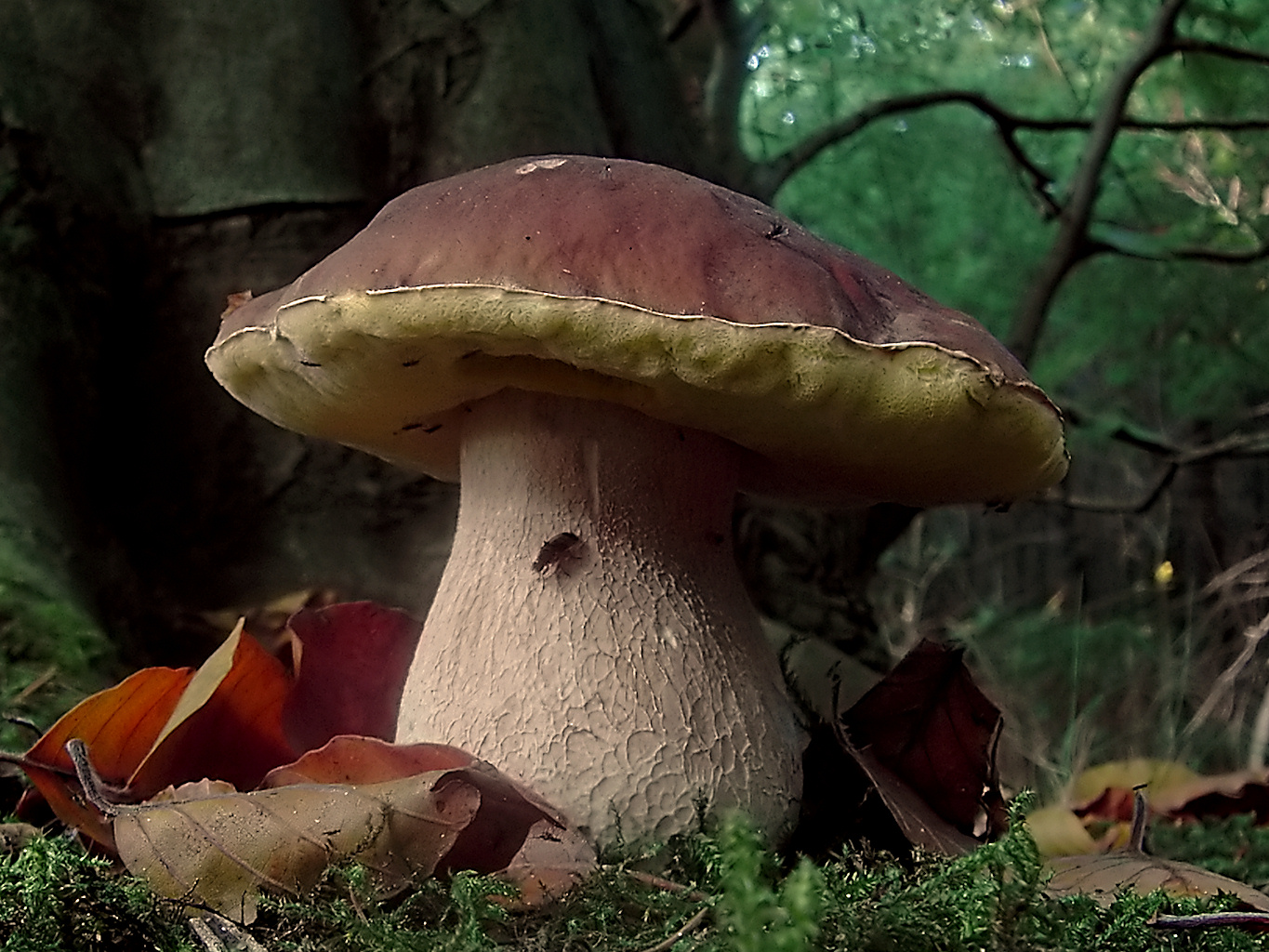
Boletus edulis Bull. 1781

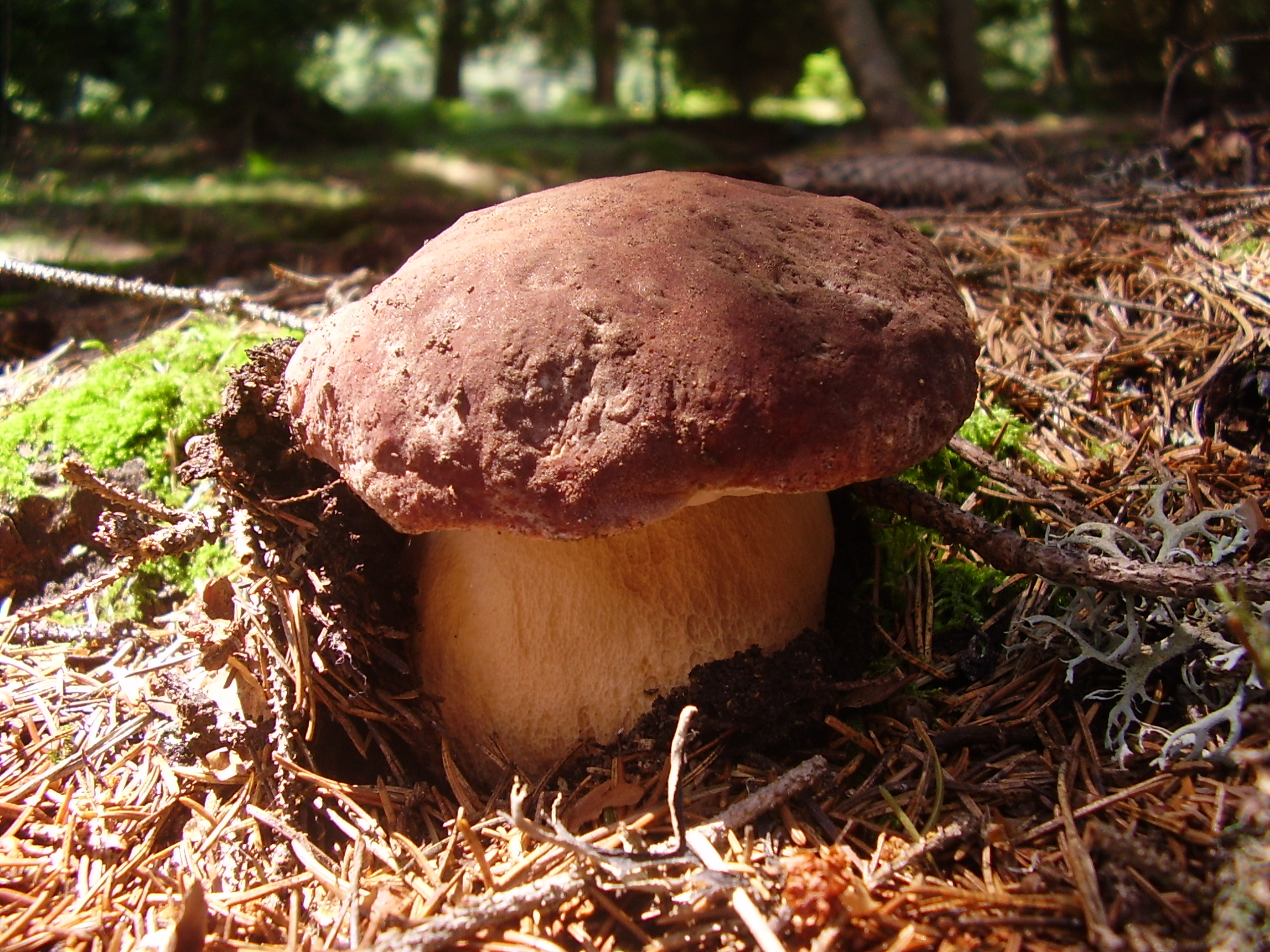
Boletus pinophilus Pilát & Dermek 1973

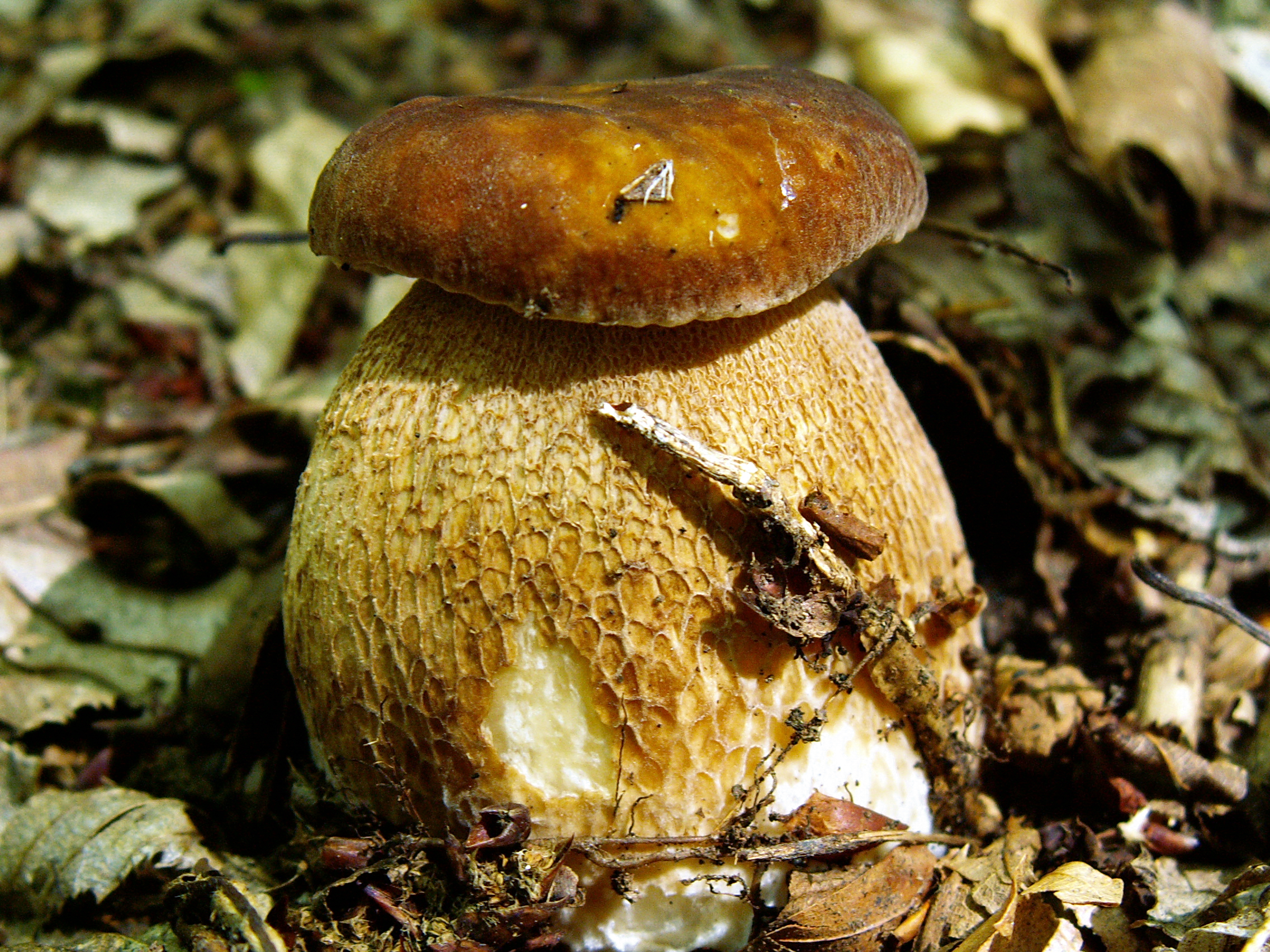
Boletus reticulatus Schaeff. 1774

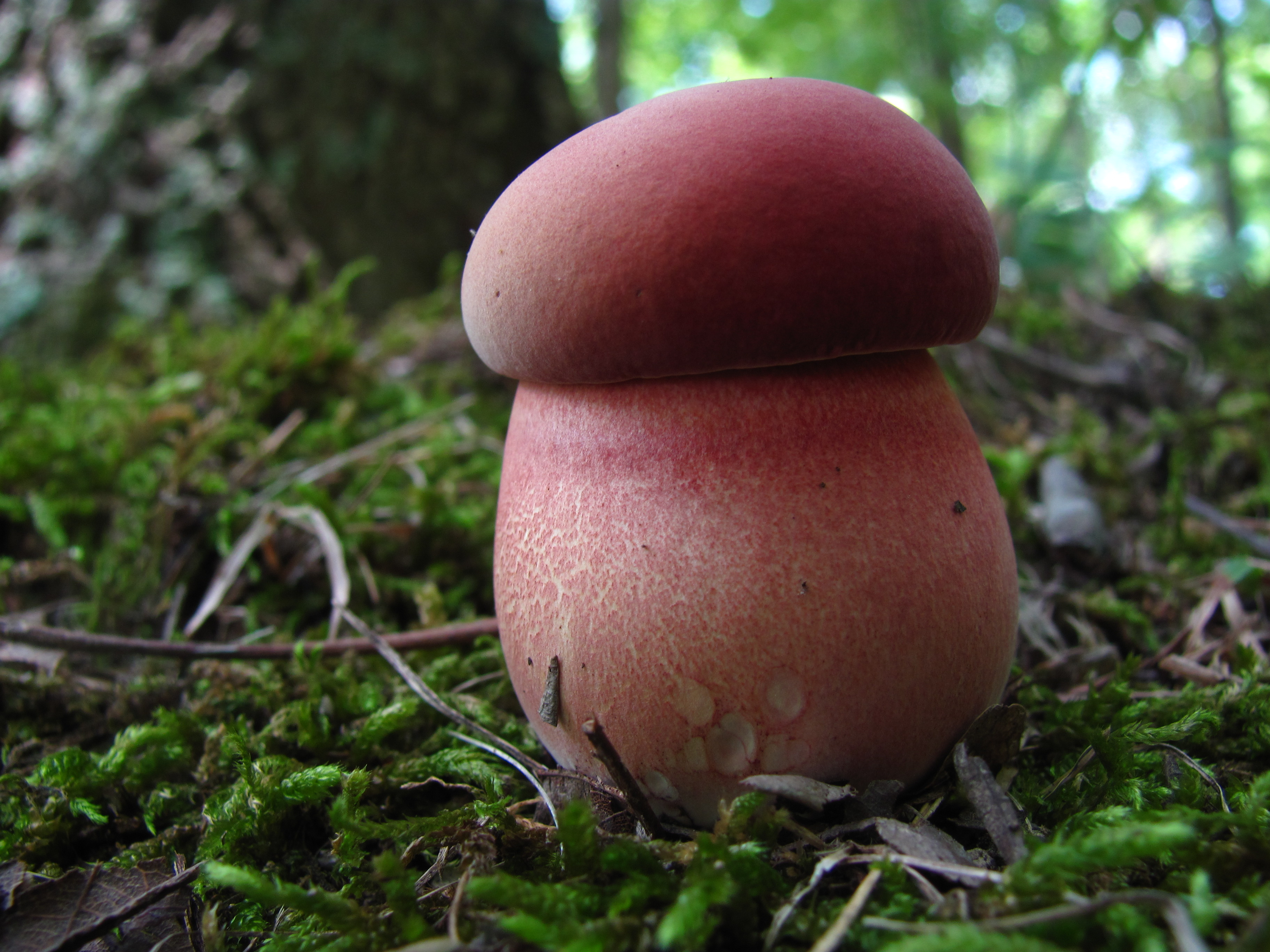
Boletus sensibilis Peck 1879

== Species ==
- Boletus aereus - ontto beltza, porcino nero, queen bolete, bronzy bolete, bronzos vargánya
- Boletus albisulphureus - chalky-white bolete
- Boletus albobrunnescens – Thailand
- Boletus alutaceus
- Boletus amyloideus
- Boletus atkinsonii
- Boletus aurantiosplendens
- Boletus aureissimus
- Boletus aureomycelinus
- Boletus auripes
- Boletus austroedulis – Australia
- Boletus bainiugan - China
- Boletus bannaensis (Japan)
- Boletus barragensis
- Boletus barrowsii - white king bolete
- Boletus bicoloroides
- Boletus billieae
- Boletus borneensis
- Boletus botryoides - China
- Boletus brasiliensis
- Boletus bresidolanus
- Boletus brevitubus
- Boletus brunneirubens
- Boletus brunneissimus
- Boletus brunneopanoides
- Boletus brunneotomentosus
- Boletus caespitosus (edible)
- Boletus calocystides
- Boletus campestris (edible)
- Boletus carminiporus
- Boletus castaneo-brunneus
- Boletus castanopsidis (Papua New Guinea)
- Boletus citrinoporus
- Boletus citrinovirens
- Boletus coccyginus
- Boletus coniferarum
- Boletus cookei
- Boletus curtisii
- Boletus cutifractus
- Boletus debeauxii
- Boletus declivitatum
- Boletus dimocarpicola
- Boletus discolor
- Boletus edulis - cep, porcini, king bolete, penny bun, ontto txuri
- Boletus fagacicola
- Boletus fairchildianus
- Boletus ferrugineus
- Boletus ferruginosporus
- Boletus fibrillosus
- Boletus flammans
- Boletus flaviporus
- Boletus flavoniger
- Boletus flavus
- Boletus formosus
- Boletus fraternus (edible, but low quality)
- Boletus fuligineus
- Boletus fulvus
- Boletus fuscopunctatus
- Boletus gansuensis – China
- Boletus gentiliis
- Boletus gertrudiae
- Boletus glabellus
- Boletus granulopunctatus
- Boletus griseiceps
- Boletus griseus (edible)
- Boletus gyrodontoides
- Boletus haematinus
- Boletus harrisonii
- Boletus hemichrysus
- Boletus hiratsukae (Japan)
- Boletus holoxanthus
- Boletus huronensis
- Boletus hypoxanthus
- Boletus instabilis
- Boletus kermesinus (Japan)
- Boletus laetissimus
- Boletus leptospermi (New Zealand)
- Boletus leuphaeus
- Boletus lewisii
- Boletus lignatilis
- Boletus lignicola (edible)
- Boletus longicurvipes (edible)
- Boletus loyo
- Boletus luridellus
- Boletus lychnipes
- Boletus mahogonicolor
- Boletus mamorensis
- Boletus manicus (New Guinea)
- Boletus marekii (Czech Republic)
- Boletus megalosporus
- Boletus melleoluteus
- Boletus michoacanus
- Boletus miniato-olivaceus
- Boletus miniato-pallescens
- Boletus modestus - China
- Boletus monilifer
- Boletus morrisii
- Boletus mottiae
- Boletus neoregius
- Boletus neotropicus
- Boletus nigricans
- Boletus nobilis
- Boletus nobilissimus
- Boletus novae-zelandiae
- Boletus obscuratus
- Boletus obscureumbrinus
- Boletus occidentalis
- Boletus ochraceoluteus
- Boletus odaiensis
- Boletus oliveisporus
- Boletus orientialbus (China)
- Boletus pallidoroseus
- Boletus pallidus
- Boletus paluster
- Boletus paradisiacus
- Boletus patrioticus
- Boletus peltatus
- Boletus perroseus
- Boletus phaeocephalus
- Boletus phytolaccae
- Boletus pinetorum – Fennoscandia
- Boletus pinophilus - pinewood penny bun, pine cep
- Boletus poeticus
- Boletus projectelloides
- Boletus pruinatus
- Boletus pseudoboletinus
- Boletus pseudofrostii
- Boletus pseudo-olivaceus
- Boletus pseudoregius
- Boletus puellaris
- Boletus pulchriceps
- Boletus punctilifer
- Boletus purpureorubellus
- Boletus purpureus
- Boletus pyrrhosceles
- Boletus quercinus
- Boletus quercophilus
- Boletus rawlingsii (New Zealand)
- Boletus regineus - queen bolete
- Boletus reticulatus - summer bolete
- Boletus reticuloceps
- Boletus rex-veris - spring king bolete
- Boletus ripariellus
- Boletus roseipes
- Boletus roseoareolatus
- Boletus roseolateritius – North America
- Boletus roseolus
- Boletus ruborculus
- Boletus rubriceps – Rocky Mountain red (United States)
- Boletus rubricitrinus
- Boletus rubroflammeus
- Boletus rubropunctus
- Boletus rufo-aureus
- Boletus rufo-brunnescens
- Boletus rufocinnamomeus
- Boletus rufomaculatus
- Boletus rugosellus
- Boletus rugosiceps
- Boletus rugulosiceps
- Boletus semigastroideus
- Boletus sensibilis - brick-cap bolete (Eastern North America)
- Boletus separans
- Boletus sichianus
- Boletus siculus
- Boletus sinoedulis
- Boletus smithii (edible)
- Boletus spadiceus (edible)
- Boletus speciosus (edible)
- Boletus sphaerocephalus
- Boletus squamulistipes
- Boletus subalpinus
- Boletus subcaerulescens
- Boletus subclavatosporus
- Boletus subdepauperatus
- Boletus subfraternus
- Boletus subgraveolens
- Boletus subluridellus
- Boletus subluridus
- Boletus subsanguineus
- Boletus subsplendidus
- Boletus subvelutipes
- Boletus subviolaceofuscus
- Boletus taianus
- Boletus tasmanicus
- Boletus tomentipes
- Boletus tomentulosus
- Boletus tristiculus
- Boletus truncatus
- Boletus tubulus
- Boletus tylopilopsis
- Boletus umbrinipileus
- Boletus umbriniporus
- Boletus variipes
- Boletus velutipes
- Boletus vermiculosoides
- Boletus vermiculosus
- Boletus vinaceobasis
- Boletus violaceofuscus
- Boletus viridiflavus
- Boletus viscidiceps (China)
- Boletus viscidipellis (Japan)
- Boletus viscidocorrugis
- Boletus weberi
- Boletus yunnanensis

== See also ==
- Bolete eater
