= Boletus austroedulis =

Scientific classification
- Domain: Eukaryota
- Kingdom: Fungi
- Division: Basidiomycota
- Class: Agaricomycetes
- Order: Boletales
- Family: Boletaceae
- Genus: Boletus
- Species: B. austroedulis

Binomial name
- Boletus austroedulis Halling & Fechner (2014)

Species of fungus

Boletus austroedulis is a species of bolete fungus in the family Boletaceae. Described as new to science in 2014, it is found in Australia, where it grows in groups on the ground under pink bloodwood (Corymbia intermedia) and rose she-oak (Allocasuarina torulosa). It is thought to be the first member of Boletus section Boletus (commonly known as the porcini) that is endemic to Australia. Although Boletus edulis has previously been reported from the continent, it is always in association with introduced trees, suggesting that itself is also introduced. The type collection was made in Davies Creek National Park in Queensland.

== See also ==
- List of Boletus species
