= Boletus rugulosiceps =

Scientific classification
- Domain: Eukaryota
- Kingdom: Fungi
- Division: Basidiomycota
- Class: Agaricomycetes
- Order: Boletales
- Family: Boletaceae
- Genus: Boletus
- Species: B. rugulosiceps

Binomial name
- Boletus rugulosiceps B.Ortiz, T.J.Baroni & Lodge (2007)

Species of fungus

Boletus rugulosiceps is a species of bolete fungus in the family Boletaceae. Found in Belize, it was described as new to science in 2007.

== See also ==
- List of Boletus species
