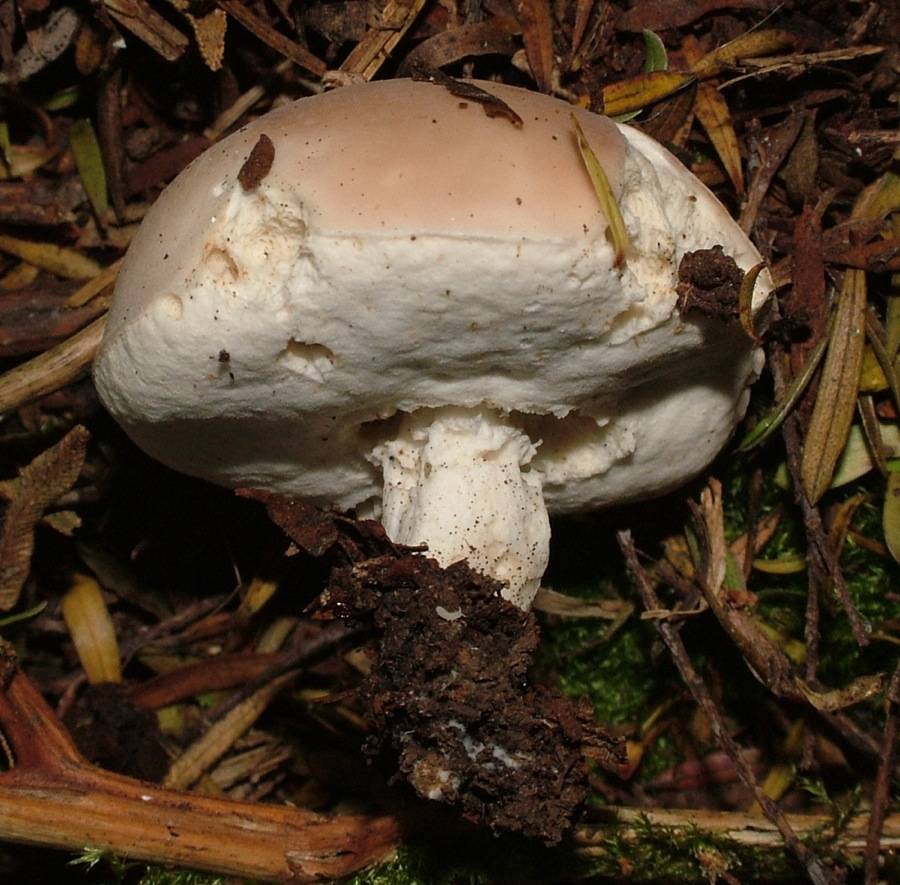

Scientific classification
- Domain: Eukaryota
- Kingdom: Fungi
- Division: Basidiomycota
- Class: Agaricomycetes
- Order: Boletales
- Family: Boletaceae
- Genus: Boletus
- Species: B. semigastroideus

Binomial name
- Boletus semigastroideus M.Nuhn, Manfr.Binder, A.F.S.Taylor, Halling (2013)

Synonyms
- Secotium areolatum G.Cunn. (1942); Notholepiota areolata (G.Cunn.) E.Horak (1971)

= Boletus semigastroideus =

Species of fungus

Boletus semigastroideus is a species of secotioid fungus in the family Boletaceae. It was originally described in 1942 as Secotium areolatum by New Zealand-based mycologist Gordon Herriot Cunningham and then renamed as Notholepiota areolata as the type species of the genus Notholepiota by Egon Horak in 1971. A molecular phylogenetics study found it to belong in Boletus sensu stricto, but the name Boletus areolatus was preoccupied, so it was renamed Boletus semigastroideus.

== See also ==
- List of Boletus species
