= Boletus brunneopanoides =

Scientific classification
- Domain: Eukaryota
- Kingdom: Fungi
- Division: Basidiomycota
- Class: Agaricomycetes
- Order: Boletales
- Family: Boletaceae
- Genus: Boletus
- Species: B. brunneopanoides

Binomial name
- Boletus brunneopanoides B.Ortiz (2007)

Species of fungus

Boletus brunneopanoides is a species of bolete fungus in the family Boletaceae. Found in Belize, it was described as new to science in 2007.

== See also ==
- List of Boletus species
