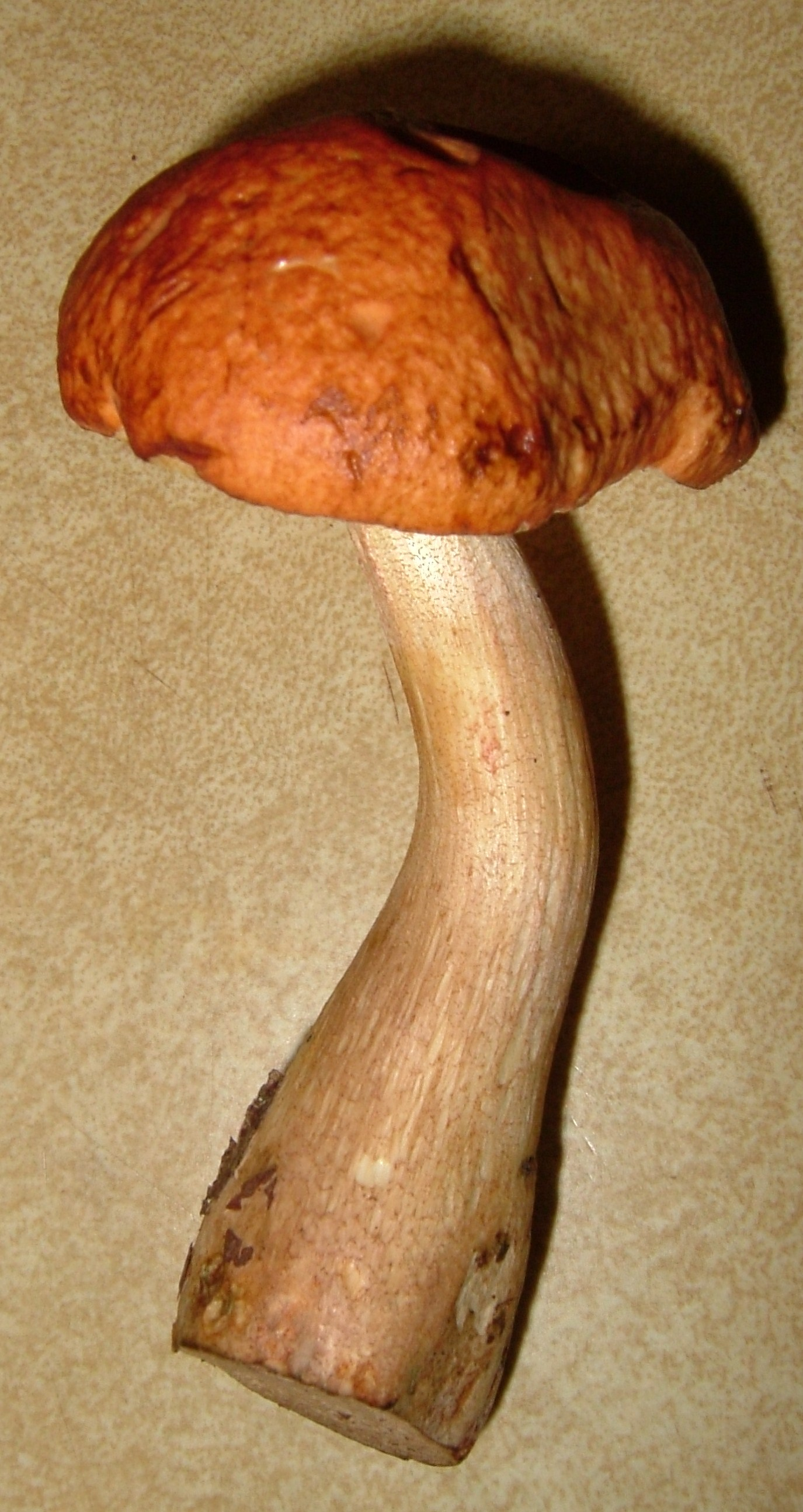

Scientific classification
- Domain: Eukaryota
- Kingdom: Fungi
- Division: Basidiomycota
- Class: Agaricomycetes
- Order: Boletales
- Family: Boletaceae
- Genus: Boletus
- Species: B. viscidocorrugis

Binomial name
- Boletus viscidocorrugis Both (1998)

= Boletus viscidocorrugis =

Species of fungus

== Taxonomy ==
Boletus viscidocorrugis is a fungus of the genus Boletus native to North America. It was described scientifically by Ernst Both in 1998.

== Description ==
Cap slimy, very wrinkled, orange-brown; pore surface white to pale yellow becoming olive, not bruising; stem whitish to brownish, with white scabers that do not darken in age; flesh white, staining pink on exposure; cap bright red with ammonia; spores 14-19 μm long; found on ground under oak Quercus rubra and among or on decayed leaves; known only from western New York.

== See also ==
- List of Boletus species
