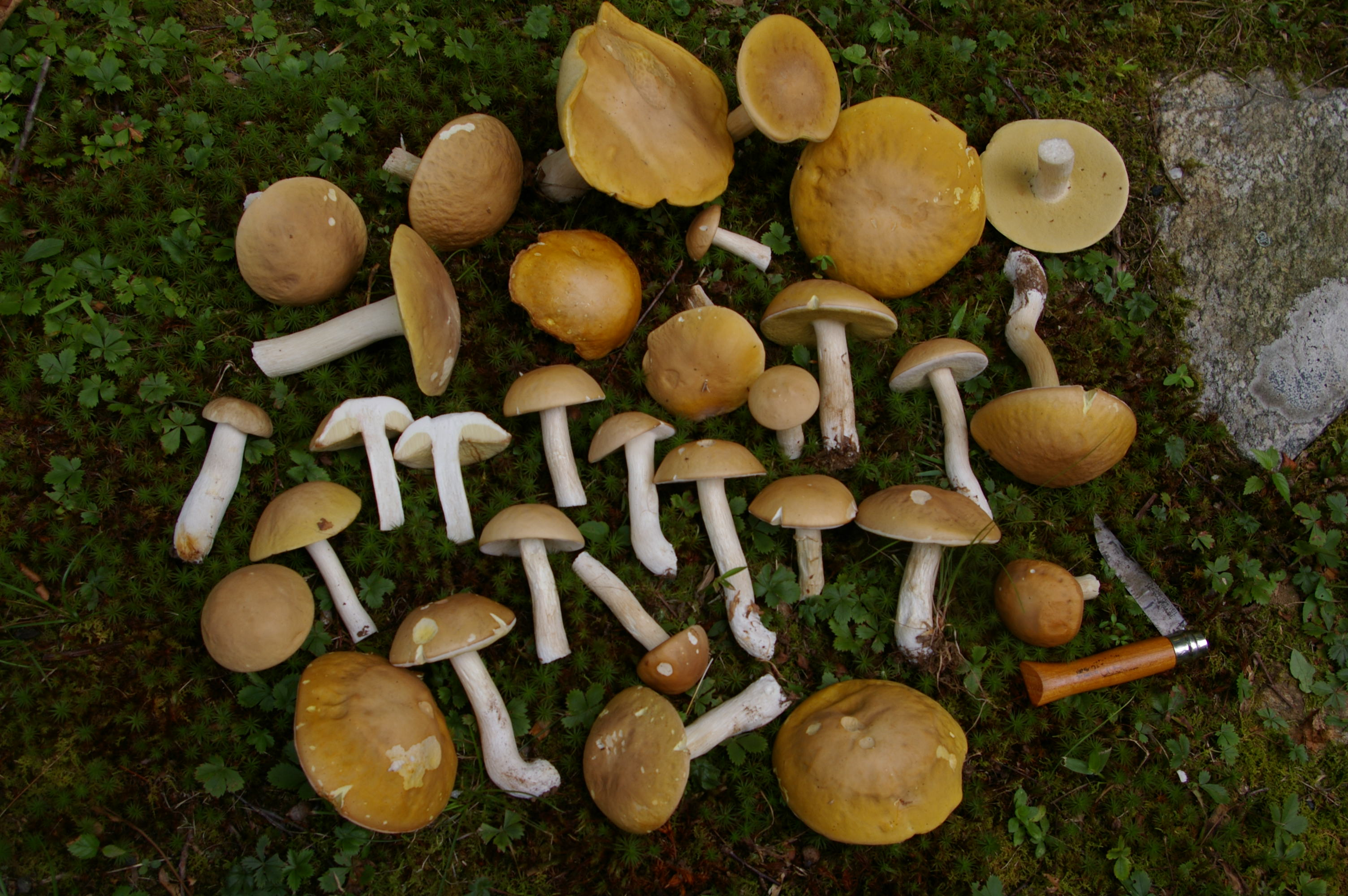

Scientific classification
- Domain: Eukaryota
- Kingdom: Fungi
- Division: Basidiomycota
- Class: Agaricomycetes
- Order: Boletales
- Family: Boletaceae
- Genus: Boletus
- Species: B. gertrudiae

Binomial name
- Boletus gertrudiae Peck (1911)

= Boletus gertrudiae =

Species of fungus

Boletus gertrudiae is a species of bolete fungus in the family Boletaceae. Found in North America, it was first described scientifically by mycologist Charles Horton Peck in 1911, from collections made in Old Lyme, Connecticut. The specific epithet honors Miss Gertrude Wells who "though young in years, has already manifested a remarkable interest in mushrooms and has a wonderful proficiency in the knowledge of them."

== See also ==
- List of Boletus species
- List of North American boletes
