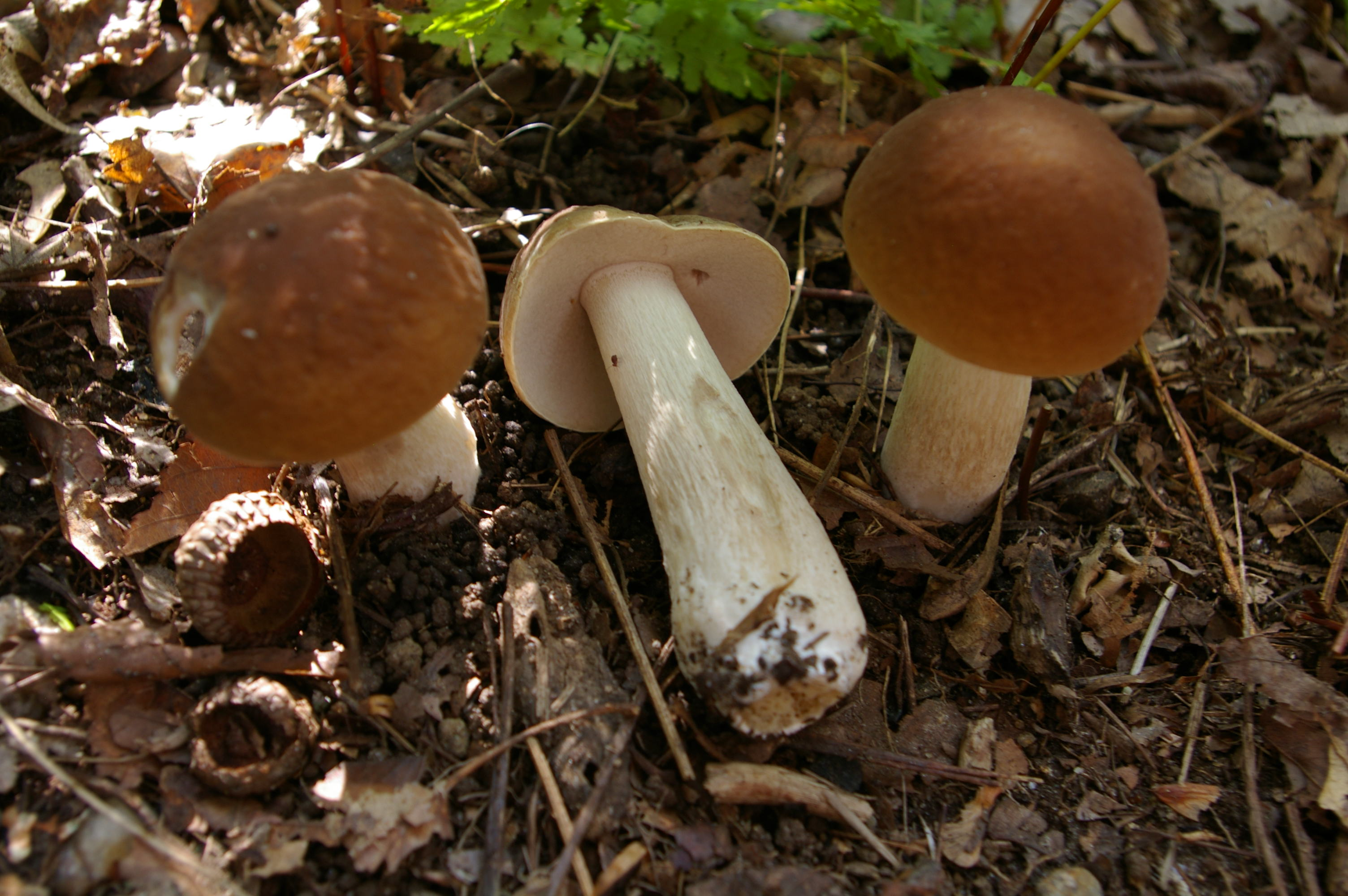

Scientific classification
- Kingdom: Fungi
- Division: Basidiomycota
- Class: Agaricomycetes
- Order: Boletales
- Family: Boletaceae
- Genus: Boletus
- Species: B. nobilis

Binomial name
- Boletus nobilis (Peck 1910)

= Boletus nobilis =

Species of fungus

Boletus nobilis Mycological characteristics
- Pores on hymenium
- Cap is convex
- Hymenium is adnate
- Stipe is bare
- Spore print is brown
- Ecology is mycorrhizal
- Edibility is edible

Boletus nobilis, the noble bolete, is a species of edible basidiomycete mushroom of the genus Boletus found in eastern United States. Morphologically close to Boletus edulis, it is distinguished by an elongated stem, a beige skin and white pores, even when old.

== Taxonomy ==
The species was described as Boletus nobilis by Peck in 1910. For many years Boletus nobilis was considered a subspecies or form of Boletus edulis. Phylogenetic analysis has shown that Boletus nobilis is a separate species and a member of a clade closely related to Boletus separans.

== Morphology ==
Basidiocarp: as with other boletes, the size of the fruitbody is variable, but it does not reach the prominence of Boletus edulis. Flesh is "thin even in very large specimens"

Hymenium: pores white, even when old, without the "greenish tint" of B. edulis. Pores not depressed around the stipe.

Pileus:7-20cm wide, convex becoming plane with age, dry, with a yellowish to reddish brown skin, lighter in the center of the cap, becoming lighter with age to pale ochraceous.

Stipe: the stipe is elongated, sometimes bulbous, and its general color white, sometimes "with a lilaceous tinge". It is finely reticulated below the hymenium, the reticulation being shallow.

Spore print: dull ochre brown to dull rusty brown.

== Distribution and habitat ==
Boletus nobilis is found under oak and beech trees on the East Coast of the United States: Appalachia, Pennsylvania, Ohio from summer to fall.

== Edibility ==
Boletus nobilis is edible, but not as desirable as the lookalike boletes. It can be preserved and cooked or frozen.

== See also ==
- List of Boletus species
- List of North American boletes
