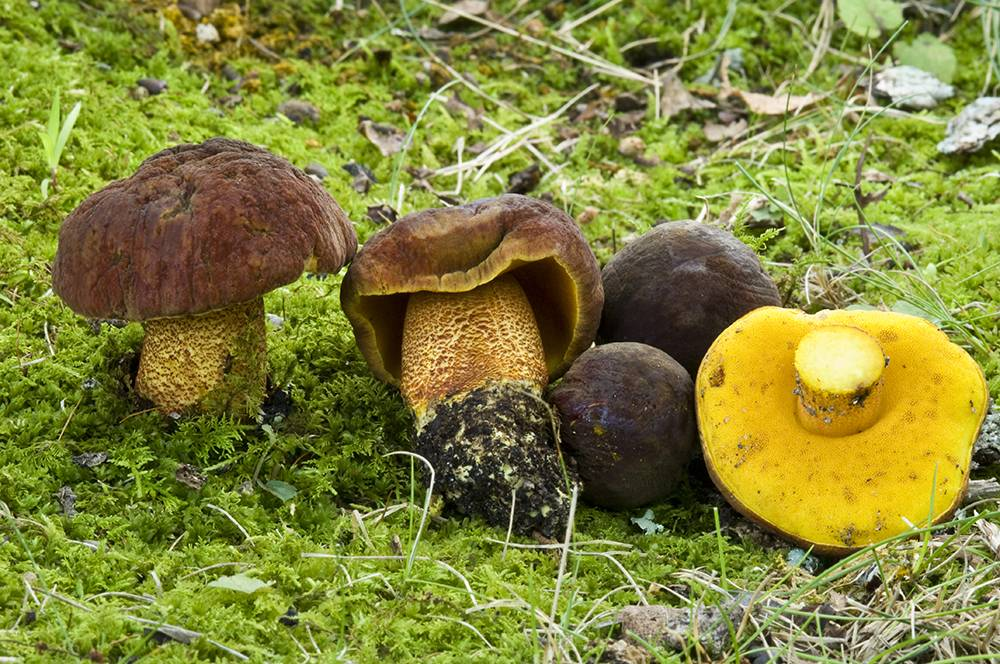

Scientific classification
- Kingdom: Fungi
- Division: Basidiomycota
- Class: Agaricomycetes
- Order: Boletales
- Family: Boletaceae
- Genus: Boletus
- Species: B. morrisii

Binomial name
- Boletus morrisii Peck

Synonyms
- Tubiporus morrisii (Peck) S.Imai (1968); Xerocomus morrisii (Peck) M.Zang (1996)

= Boletus morrisii =

Species of fungus

Boletus morrisii is a fungus of the genus Boletus native to North America. It was described in 1909 by mycologist Charles Horton Peck.

== See also ==
- List of Boletus species
- List of North American boletes
