= Boletus purpureus =

Scientific classification
- Kingdom: Fungi
- Division: Basidiomycota
- Class: Agaricomycetes
- Order: Boletales
- Family: Boletaceae
- Genus: Boletus
- Species: B. purpureus

Binomial name
- Boletus purpureus Pers.

Species of fungus

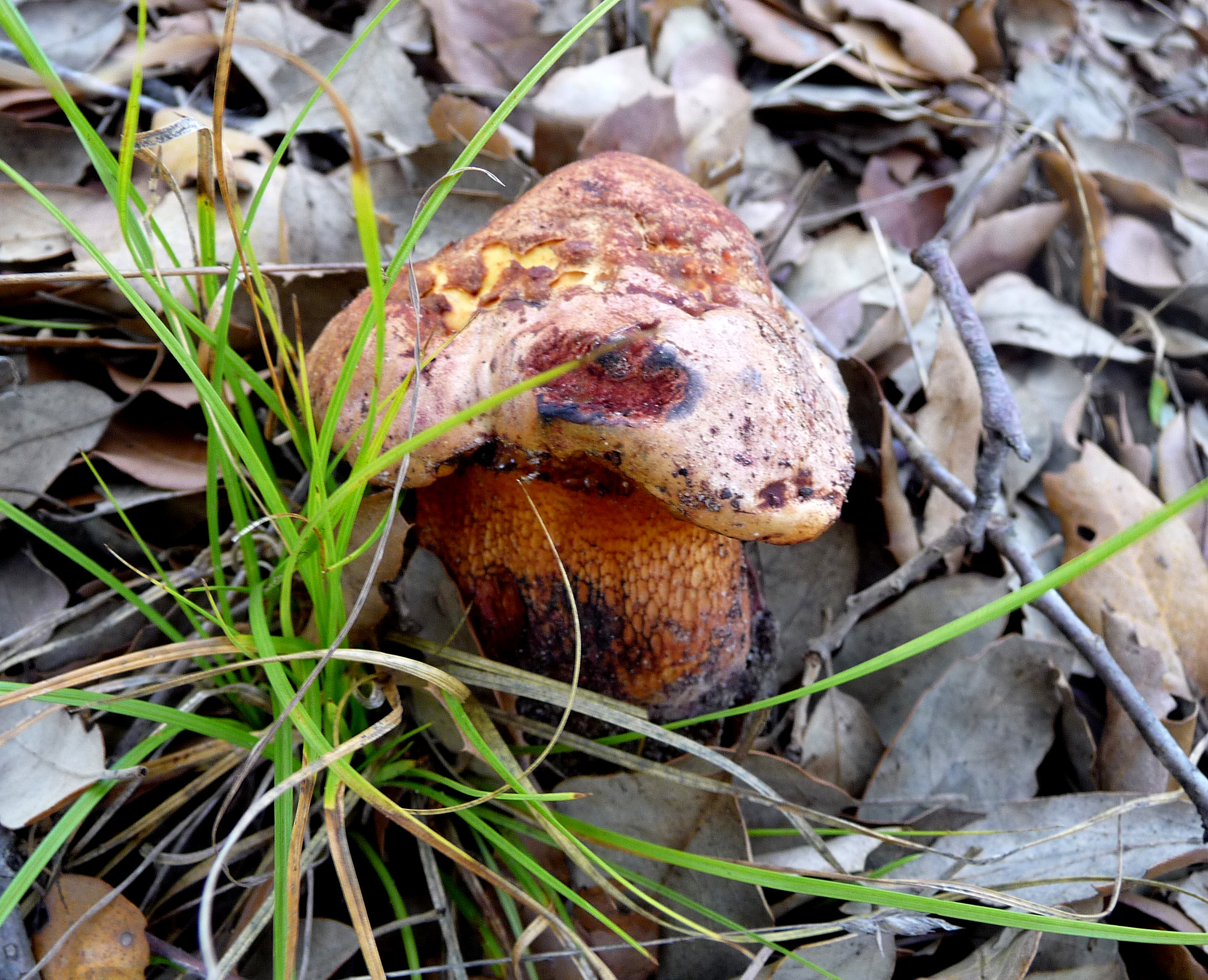

Boletus purpureus, commonly known as the purple boletus, is a species of bolete fungus in the family Boletaceae. Found in Europe, where it grows in mixed woods, it was originally described by Christian Hendrik Persoon in 1825. The fruit bodies are poisonous if they are eaten raw.

== See also ==
- List of Boletus species
