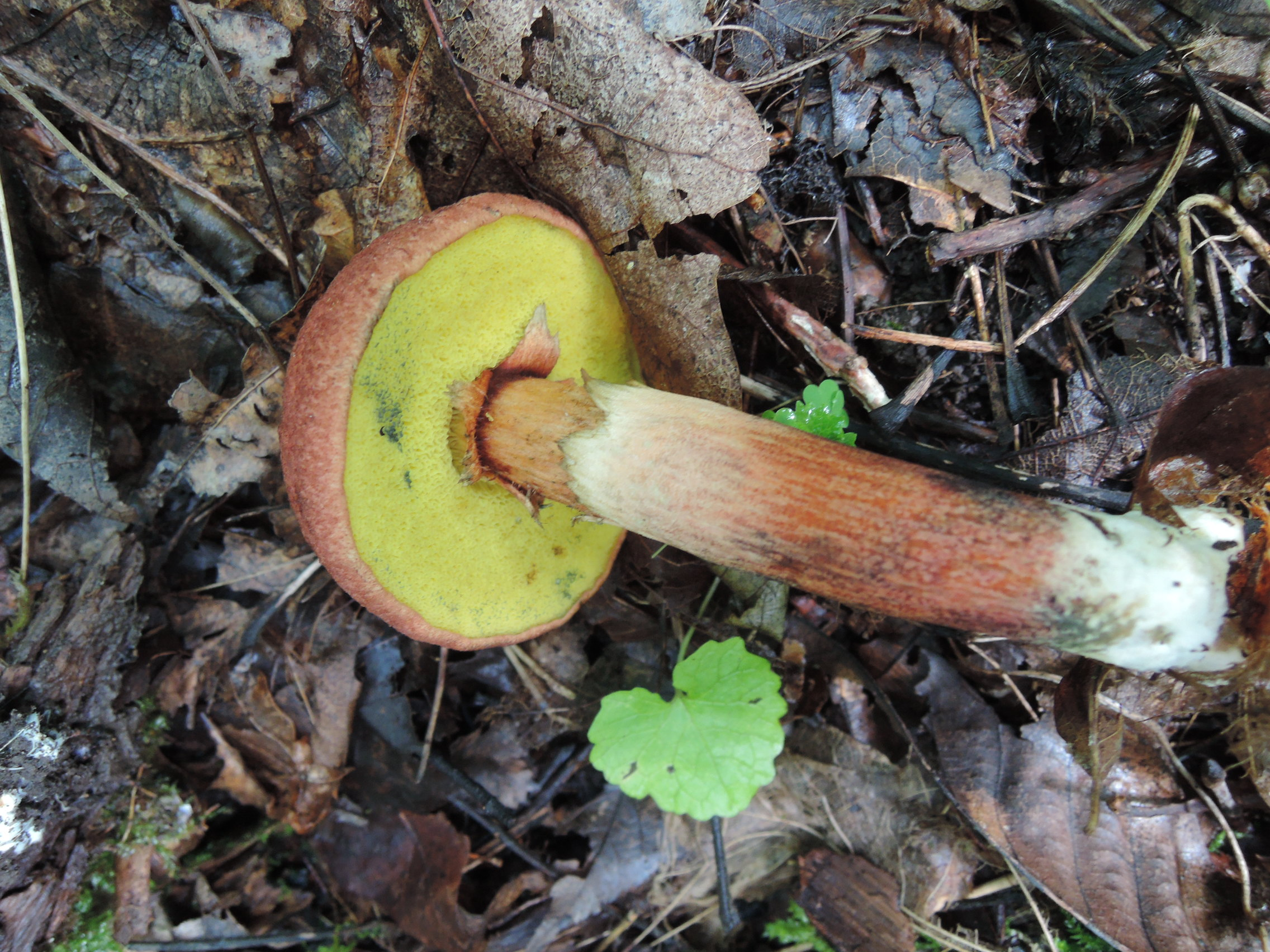

Scientific classification
- Domain: Eukaryota
- Kingdom: Fungi
- Division: Basidiomycota
- Class: Agaricomycetes
- Order: Boletales
- Family: Boletaceae
- Genus: Boletus
- Species: B. rufomaculatus

Binomial name
- Boletus rufomaculatus Both (1998)

= Boletus rufomaculatus =

Species of fungus in North America

Boletus rufomaculatus is a fungus of the genus Boletus native to North America. It was described scientifically by Ernst Both in 1998.

== See also ==
- List of Boletus species
- List of North American boletes
