= Davies Creek Falls =

- Location within Queensland
- Location: Far North Queensland, Australia
- Coordinates: 17°00′29″S 145°34′51″E
- Type: Cascade
- Total height: 100 metres (330 ft)
- Number of drops: 2
- Longest drop: 76–75 metres (249–246 ft)
- Total width: 6 metres (20 ft)
- Watercourse: Davies Creek

The Davies Creek Falls is a cascade waterfall on the Davies Creek in the Far North region of Queensland, Australia.

== Location and features ==
The falls are located within the Davies Creek National Park, south west of Cairns and descend 100 metres (330 ft) in two drops at an estimated width of 6 metres (20 ft), with the longest of the two drops estimated to descend 75–76 metres (246–249 ft) from the Atherton Tableland to the valley below.

== See also ==
- List of waterfalls
- List of waterfalls in Australia
