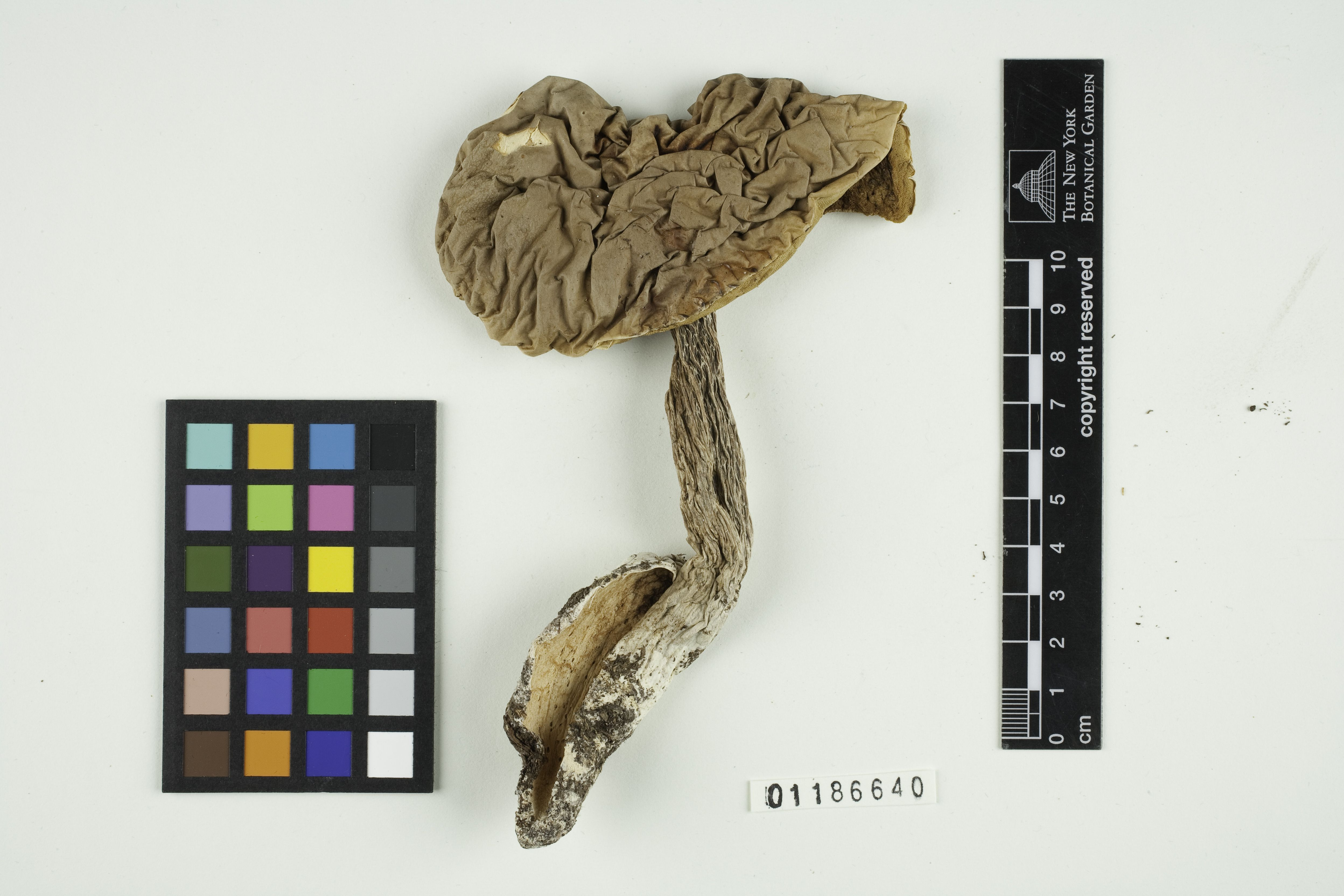

Scientific classification
- Kingdom: Fungi
- Division: Basidiomycota
- Class: Agaricomycetes
- Order: Boletales
- Family: Boletaceae
- Genus: Boletus
- Species: B. pinetorum

Binomial name
- Boletus pinetorum M.Korhonen (2009)

= Boletus pinetorum =

Species of bolete fungus

Boletus pinetorum is an edible bolete fungus in the family Boletaceae. Generally found in Fennoscandia, it was described as a new species in 2009 from a collection made in Finland. It resembles the popular Boletus edulis but is distinct from that species genetically. Fruitbodies of B. pinetorum have greyish brown caps with wrinkled margins. The bolete is mycorrhizal with pines, and grows in dry sandy pine heaths and dry coniferous forests.

== Taxonomy ==
Boletus pinetorum was formally introduced as a new species by Korhonen, Liimatainen and Niskanen in their 2009 study of the Boletus edulis complex in Fennoscandia. The authors compared six taxa in Boletus sect. Boletus occurring in Finland, using both traditional morphological characters and DNA sequence data from the internal transcribed spacers (ITS1, ITS2) and the intergenic spacer region IGS1. Although molecular analyses did not fully resolve relationships within the B. edulis group, consistent differences in spore shape, the dimensions and shape of caulocystidia (specialised cells on the stipe), and the structure of the pileipellis (cap cuticle) supported recognition of B pinetorum as a distinct species.

== Description ==
The cap (pileus) measures 15–35 cm across, occasionally up to 50 cm, its surface smooth to almost smooth and greyish brown—sometimes yellowish or dark brown—and becoming slightly viscid when wet. The margin may appear gently wrinkled when mature. On the underside is the hymenophore, composed of tubes 2–4 cm long that begin yellow, turn greenish yellow and finally greyish yellow‑green; the small, round pores match the tube colour. The stipe (stem) is 10–20 cm tall and 3–5 cm wide, cylindrical or tapering slightly at the base, whitish with a brownish tint and overlaid by a distinct, white reticulation (net‑pattern) whose meshes measure up to 10 by 2 mm. The flesh is firm and white, tinged yellowish brown beneath the cap cuticle, with a pleasant taste and a strong, agreeable aroma.

Microscopically, spores are elongated (fusiform), smooth, thick‑walled and measure 16.5–19 by 5.5–6.5 micrometre (μm) (average 17.5 by 5.8 μm). Caulocystidia—flask‑shaped cells on the stipe surface—are 70–160 by 13–30 μm and broader at the tip. The cap cuticle (pileipellis) consists of long, variably pigmented hyphae whose terminal cells are cylindrical to slightly club‑shaped, 30–60 by 6–12 μm.

== Habitat and distribution ==
Boletus pinetorum forms ectomycorrhizal associations exclusively with Pinus sylvestris (Scots pine). It is most often encountered in dry, sandy pine heaths and dry to moderately moist coniferous forests, fruiting later in the season than many other boletes (typically late summer). To date it has been recorded from across Fennoscandia, including Finland, Sweden and Estonia.

== See also ==
- List of Boletus species
