= Boletus kermesinus =

Scientific classification
- Domain: Eukaryota
- Kingdom: Fungi
- Division: Basidiomycota
- Class: Agaricomycetes
- Order: Boletales
- Family: Boletaceae
- Genus: Boletus
- Species: B. kermesinus

Binomial name
- Boletus kermesinus Har.Takah., Taneyama & Koyama (2011)

Species of fungus

Boletus kermesinus is a species of bolete fungus. The fruit bodies are dark red with a sticky cap, and have a reticulate stem. Newly described in 2011, the fungus is known only from central Honshu, Japan, where it grows in subalpine coniferous forests.

== See also ==
- List of Boletus species
