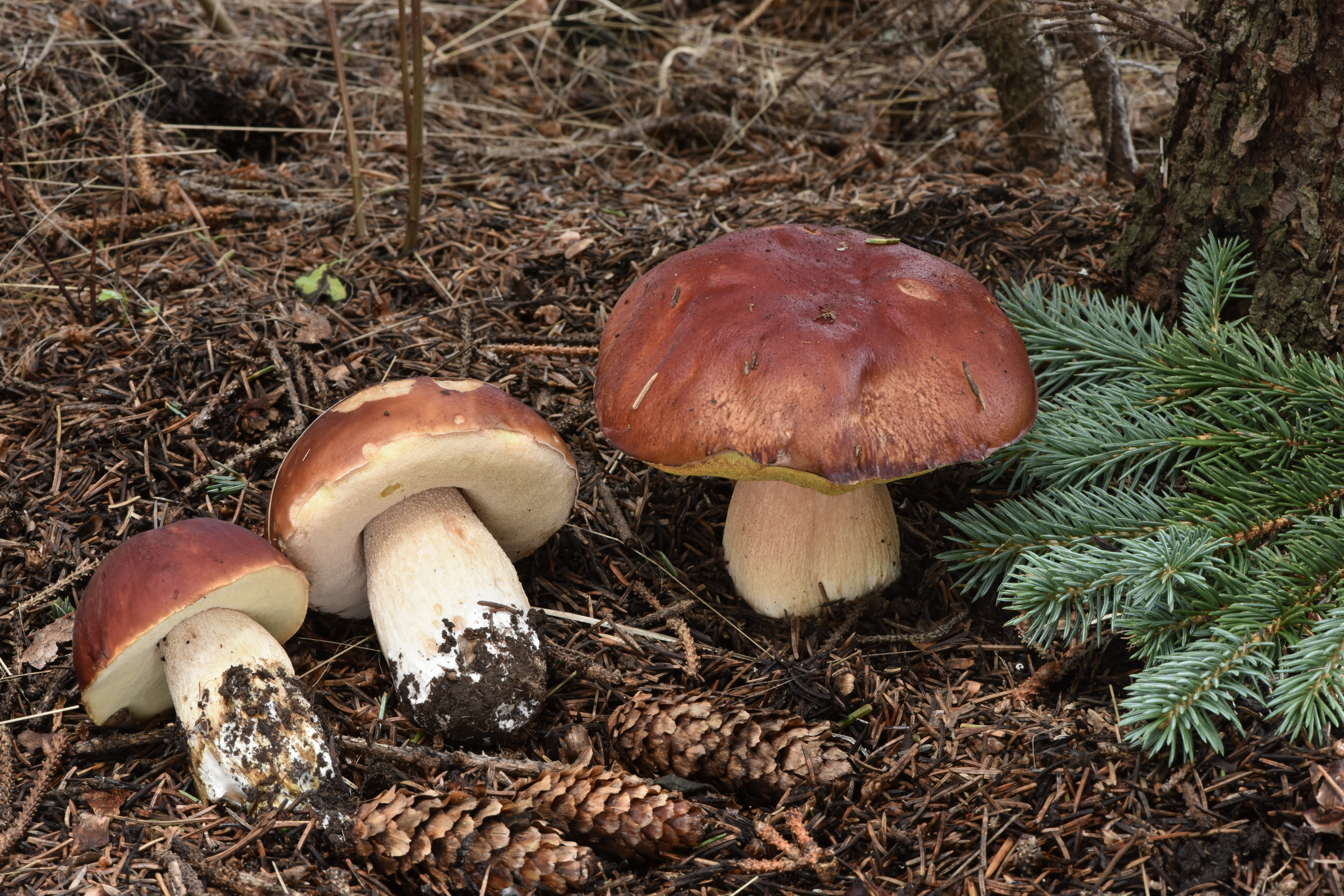

Scientific classification
- Domain: Eukaryota
- Kingdom: Fungi
- Division: Basidiomycota
- Class: Agaricomycetes
- Order: Boletales
- Family: Boletaceae
- Genus: Boletus
- Species: B. rubriceps

Binomial name
- Boletus rubriceps D.Arora & J.L.Frank (2014)

= Boletus rubriceps =

Species of fungus

Boletus rubriceps Mycological characteristics
- Pores on hymenium
- Cap is convex
- Hymenium is adnate
- Stipe is bare
- Spore print is olive-brown
- Ecology is mycorrhizal
- Edibility is choice

Boletus rubriceps is a species of bolete fungus in the family Boletaceae. Although it was officially described as new to science in 2014, the bolete had previously been reported as either Boletus edulis or B. pinophilus. Molecular analysis showed that it was sufficiently different from other morphologically similar Boletus species to warrant designation as a distinct species. It is found in the southwestern United States and southern Rocky Mountains, where it associates with spruce, pine, and sometimes fir. The fruit bodies are edible and highly sought after; they are often sold in farmer's markets of Arizona, New Mexico, and Colorado, and are used in some restaurants. The specific epithet refers to the reddish color of the caps (Latin ruber = "red"; caput = "head" or "cap"). Common names given to the bolete include "Ruby Porcini", "Rocky Mountain red-capped king bolete” or “Rocky Mountain red".

== See also ==
- List of Boletus species
- List of North American boletes
