= Boletus glabellus =

Scientific classification
- Domain: Eukaryota
- Kingdom: Fungi
- Division: Basidiomycota
- Class: Agaricomycetes
- Order: Boletales
- Family: Boletaceae
- Genus: Boletus
- Species: B. glabellus

Binomial name
- Boletus glabellus Peck (1888)

Species of fungus

Boletus glabellus is a fungus of the genus Boletus native to North America. It was described in 1888 from species collected near Menands, New York by American mycologist Charles Horton Peck.

== See also ==
- List of Boletus species
- List of North American boletes
