= Boletus vinaceobasis =

Scientific classification
- Domain: Eukaryota
- Kingdom: Fungi
- Division: Basidiomycota
- Class: Agaricomycetes
- Order: Boletales
- Family: Boletaceae
- Genus: Boletus
- Species: B. vinaceobasis

Binomial name
- Boletus vinaceobasis A.H.Sm. & Thiers (1971)

Species of fungus

Boletus vinaceobasis is a species of bolete fungus in the family Boletaceae. Found in North America, it was described as new to science in 1971 by Alexander H. Smith and Harry Delbert Thiers.

== See also ==
- List of Boletus species
