= Boletus leuphaeus =

Scientific classification
- Domain: Eukaryota
- Kingdom: Fungi
- Division: Basidiomycota
- Class: Agaricomycetes
- Order: Boletales
- Family: Boletaceae
- Genus: Boletus
- Species: B. leuphaeus

Binomial name
- Boletus leuphaeus J.Blum (1970)

Species of fungus

Boletus leuphaeus is a species of bolete fungus in the family Boletaceae. Found in France, it was described as new to science in 1970.

== See also ==
- List of Boletus species
