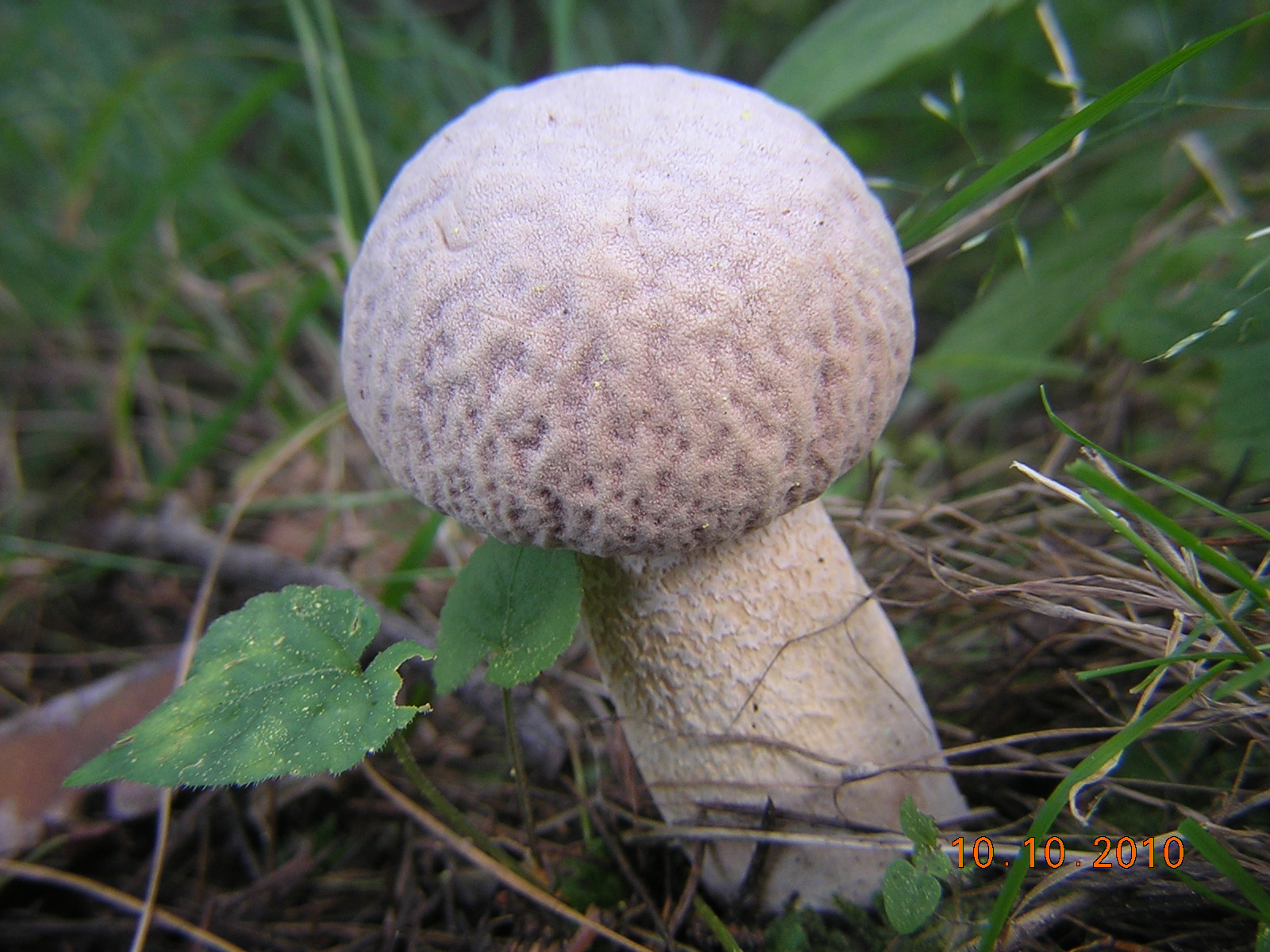
- In Tibet

Scientific classification
- Domain: Eukaryota
- Kingdom: Fungi
- Division: Basidiomycota
- Class: Agaricomycetes
- Order: Boletales
- Family: Boletaceae
- Genus: Boletus
- Species: B. reticuloceps

Binomial name
- Boletus reticuloceps (M.Zang, M.S.Yuan & M.Q.Gong) Q.B.Wang & Y.J.Yao (2005)

Synonyms
- Aureoboletus reticuloceps M.Zang, M.S.Yuan & M.Q.Gong (1993)

= Boletus reticuloceps =

Species of fungus

Boletus reticuloceps is a species of fungus in the family Boletaceae. The species was first described scientifically in 1993 as Aureoboletus reticuloceps, and later transferred to the genus Boletus in 2005. The fruit bodies have a dry cap, that is yellowish-brown, deeply wrinkled and reticulated, and covered with fibrils that form minute brown scales. Its stem is finely reticulated. The hymenophore is white when young, but becomes yellow in maturity. The flesh does not change color when bruised or injured. Its spores are olive-brown to brown. The species is found in Asia; the type collection was made in Sichuan, China, growing in forest made largely of Abies fargesii. Similar species include Aureoboletus thibetanus, Boletus castanopsidis, and B. mottiae.

== See also ==
- List of Boletus species
