= Boletus albobrunnescens =

Scientific classification
- Kingdom: Fungi
- Division: Basidiomycota
- Class: Agaricomycetes
- Order: Boletales
- Family: Boletaceae
- Genus: Boletus
- Species: B. albobrunnescens

Binomial name
- Boletus albobrunnescens Desjardin, Dentinger & D.Arora (2014)

Species of fungus

Boletus albobrunnescens is a species of bolete fungus in the family Boletaceae. It is classified in the section Boletus of the genus Boletus, commonly known as the porcini mushrooms. First reported to science in 2010, the species was officially described in 2014. It is found in mixed evergreen and deciduous forests of Thailand, where it fruits singly to scattered in soil under Pinus and Castanopsis trees. Its fruit bodies have caps measuring 5.5–11 cm (2.2–4.3 in) in diameter. They are white but stain brown to reddish brown, hence the epithet, which combines the Latin words for "white" (albo) and "becoming brown" (brunnescens). The stipe measures 6–11 cm (2.4–4.3 in) long by 1.5–2 cm (0.6–0.8 in) thick except for the swollen base, which is up to 5 cm (2 in) in diameter. The top of the stipe has a prominent network pattern (reticulations) that diminishes as it extends down to over half its length. Like the cap, it also stains brown after handling. The smooth spores are roughly spindle-shaped (fusoid), and measure 10.5–11.9 by 4.2–4.9 μm.

Boletus albobrunnescens is a good edible mushroom; it is the most expensive mushroom sold in the market of Nakhon Phanom, where in 1998 it sold for 150 Baht per kilogram.

== See also ==
- List of Boletus species
