= Boletus bresidolanus =

Scientific classification
- Domain: Eukaryota
- Kingdom: Fungi
- Division: Basidiomycota
- Class: Agaricomycetes
- Order: Boletales
- Family: Boletaceae
- Genus: Boletus
- Species: B. bresidolanus

Binomial name
- Boletus bresidolanus J.Blum (1970)

Species of fungus

Boletus bresidolanus is a species of bolete fungus in the family Boletaceae. Found in France, it was described as new to science in 1970.

== See also ==
List of Boletus species
