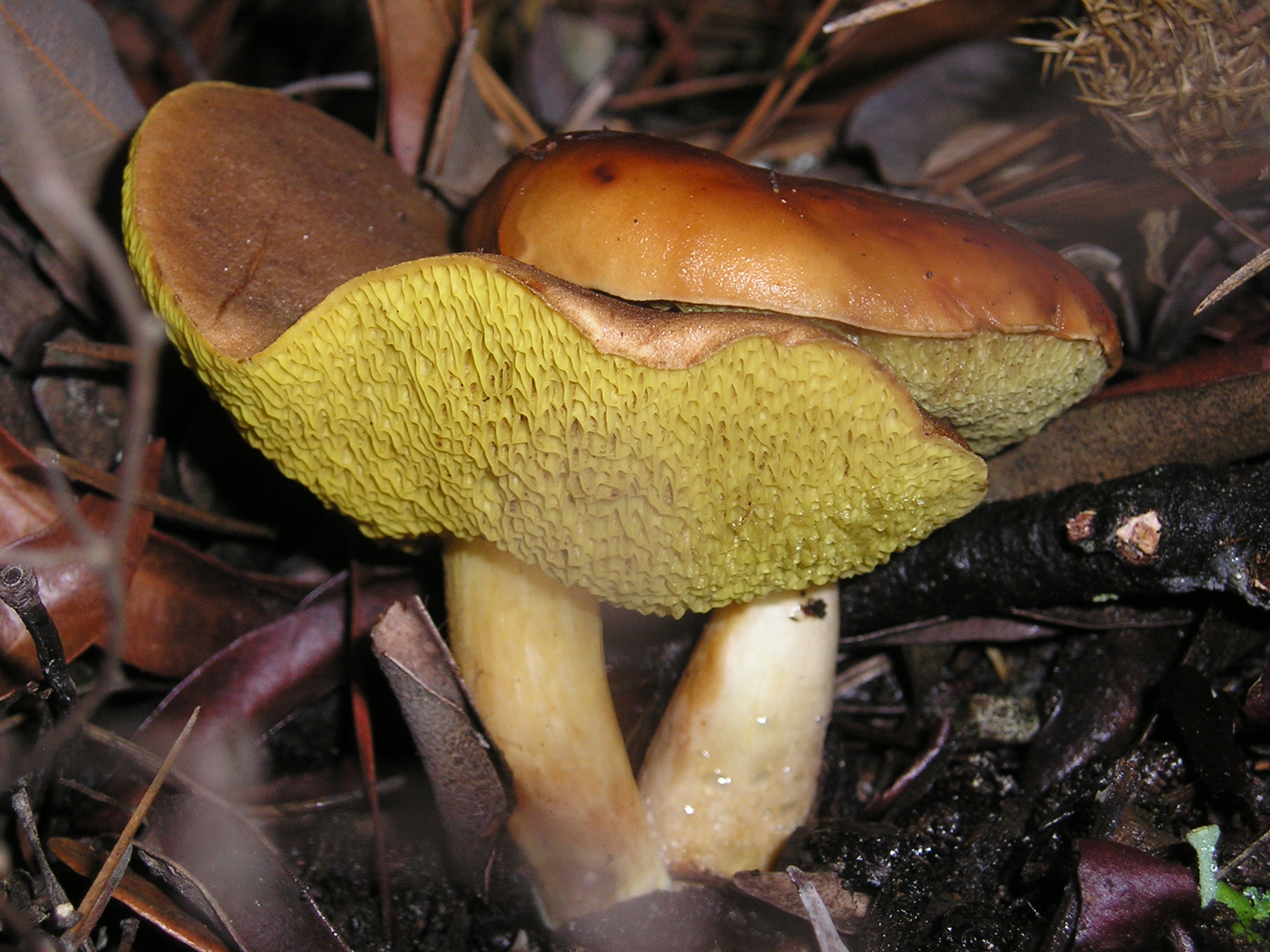

Scientific classification
- Domain: Eukaryota
- Kingdom: Fungi
- Division: Basidiomycota
- Class: Agaricomycetes
- Order: Boletales
- Family: Boletaceae
- Genus: Boletus
- Species: B. amyloideus

Binomial name
- Boletus amyloideus Thiers (1975)

= Boletus amyloideus =

Species of fungus

Boletus amyloideus is a rare species of bolete fungus in the family Boletaceae. It was described as new to science in 1975 by mycologist Harry D. Thiers, from collections made in California. It fruit bodies have a convex to somewhat flattened reddish-brown cap measuring 3–6 cm (1.2–2.4 in) in diameter. The pore surface on the cap underside is bright yellow, with small angular pores and tubes measuring 4–8 mm long. The spore print is olive-brown; basidiospores are smooth, amyloid, spindle shaped to ellipsoid, and have dimensions of 13–16 by 4.5–5.5 μm. The bolete is known only from coastal California, where it grows on the ground in mixed forests. Its edibility is unknown.

== See also ==
- List of Boletus species
- List of North American boletes
