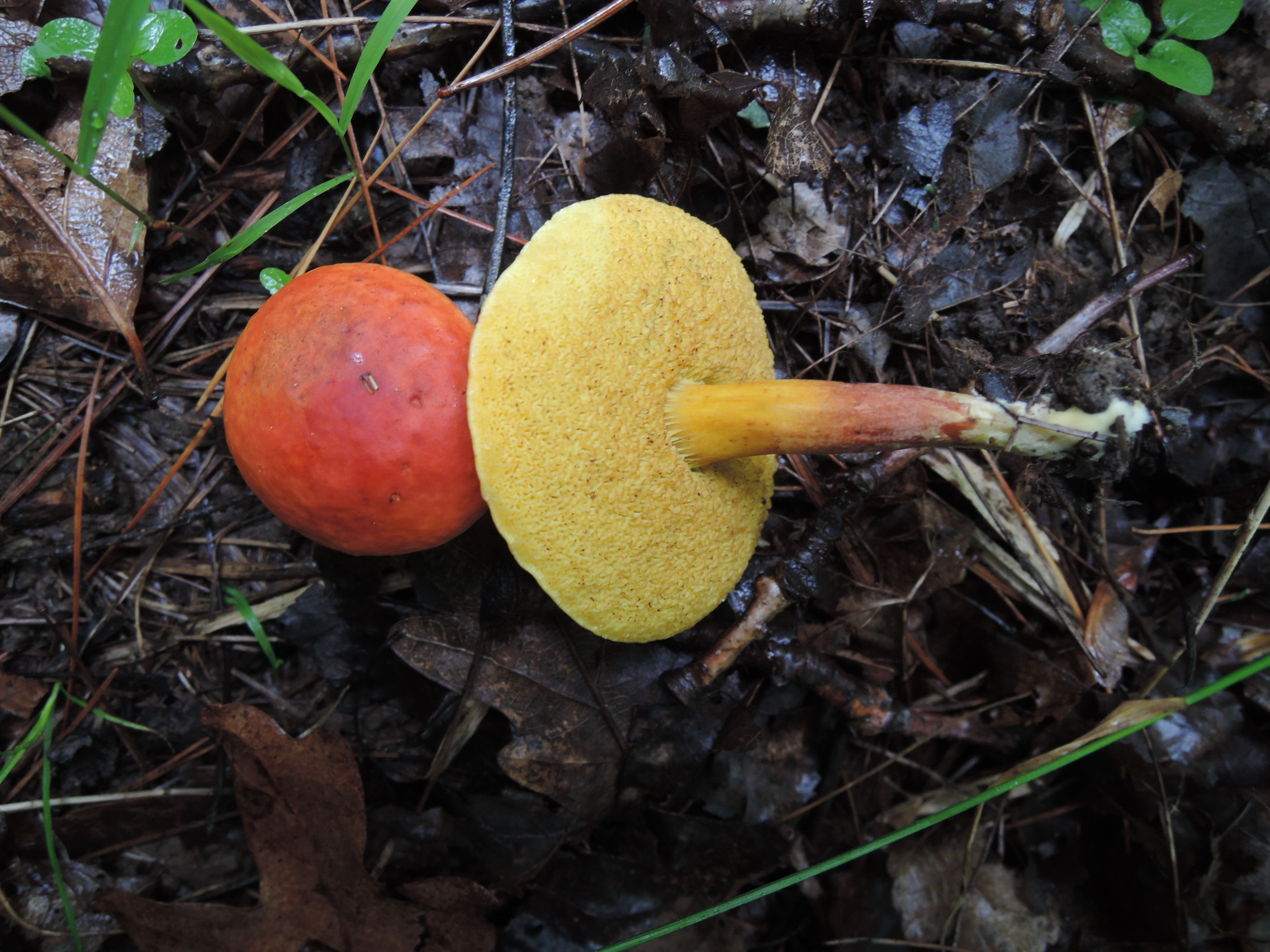

Scientific classification
- Domain: Eukaryota
- Kingdom: Fungi
- Division: Basidiomycota
- Class: Agaricomycetes
- Order: Boletales
- Family: Boletaceae
- Genus: Boletus
- Species: B. harrisonii

Binomial name
- Boletus harrisonii A.H.Sm. & Thiers (1971)

= Boletus harrisonii =

Species of fungus

Boletus harrisonii is a fungus of the genus Boletus native to the United States. It was first described officially in 1971 by mycologists Alexander H. Smith and Harry Delbert Thiers. It is named after Canadian mycologist Kenneth A. Harrison, who collected the type specimens.

== See also ==
- List of Boletus species
- List of North American boletes
