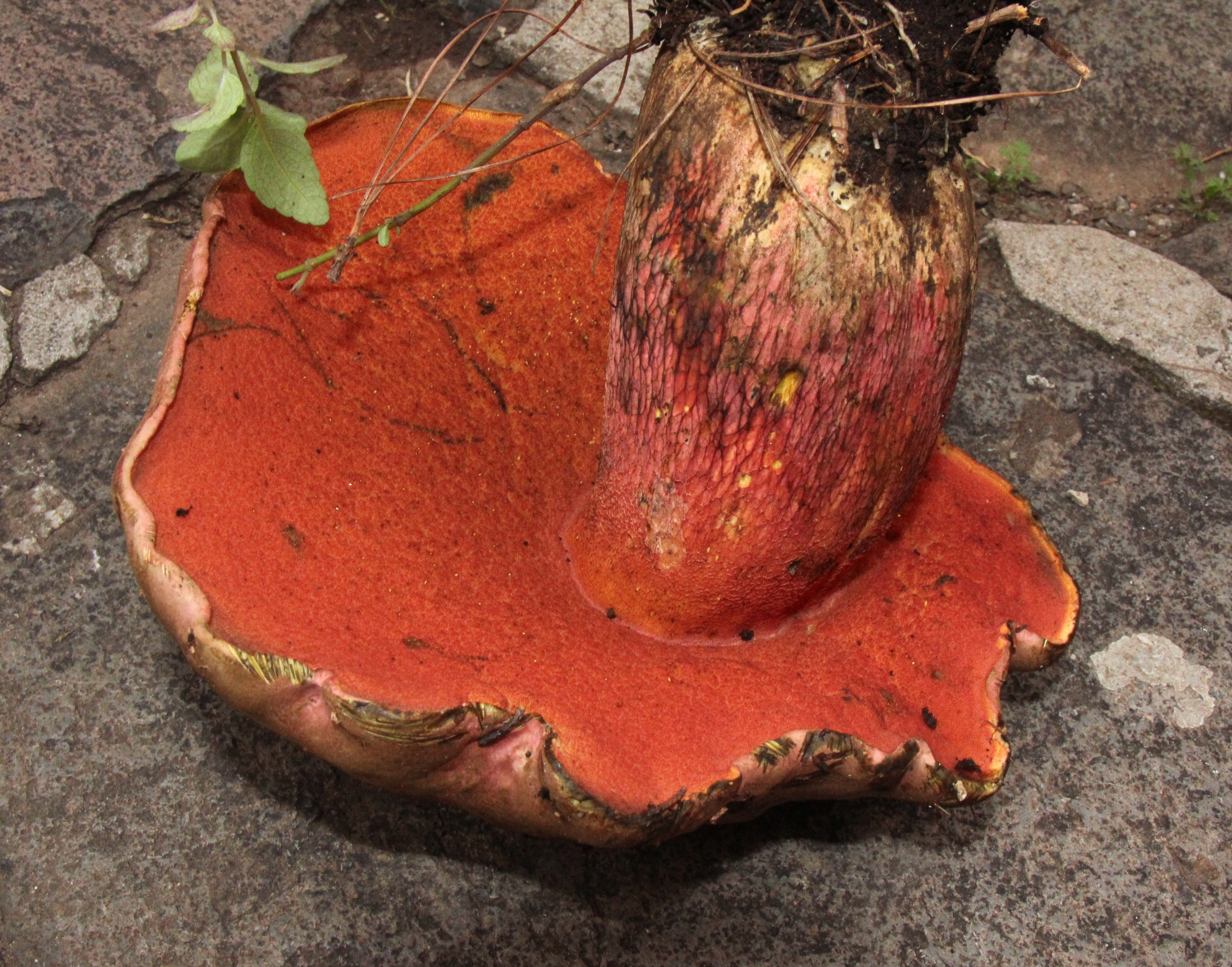
- Found in Michoacan, Mexico

Scientific classification
- Domain: Eukaryota
- Kingdom: Fungi
- Division: Basidiomycota
- Class: Agaricomycetes
- Order: Boletales
- Family: Boletaceae
- Genus: Boletus
- Species: B. michoacanus

Binomial name
- Boletus michoacanus Singer (1978)

= Boletus michoacanus =

Species of fungus

Boletus michoacanus is a pored mushroom of the family Boletaceae. Found in Mexico, the species was described as new to science in 1978 by American mycologist Rolf Singer.

== See also ==
- List of Boletus species
