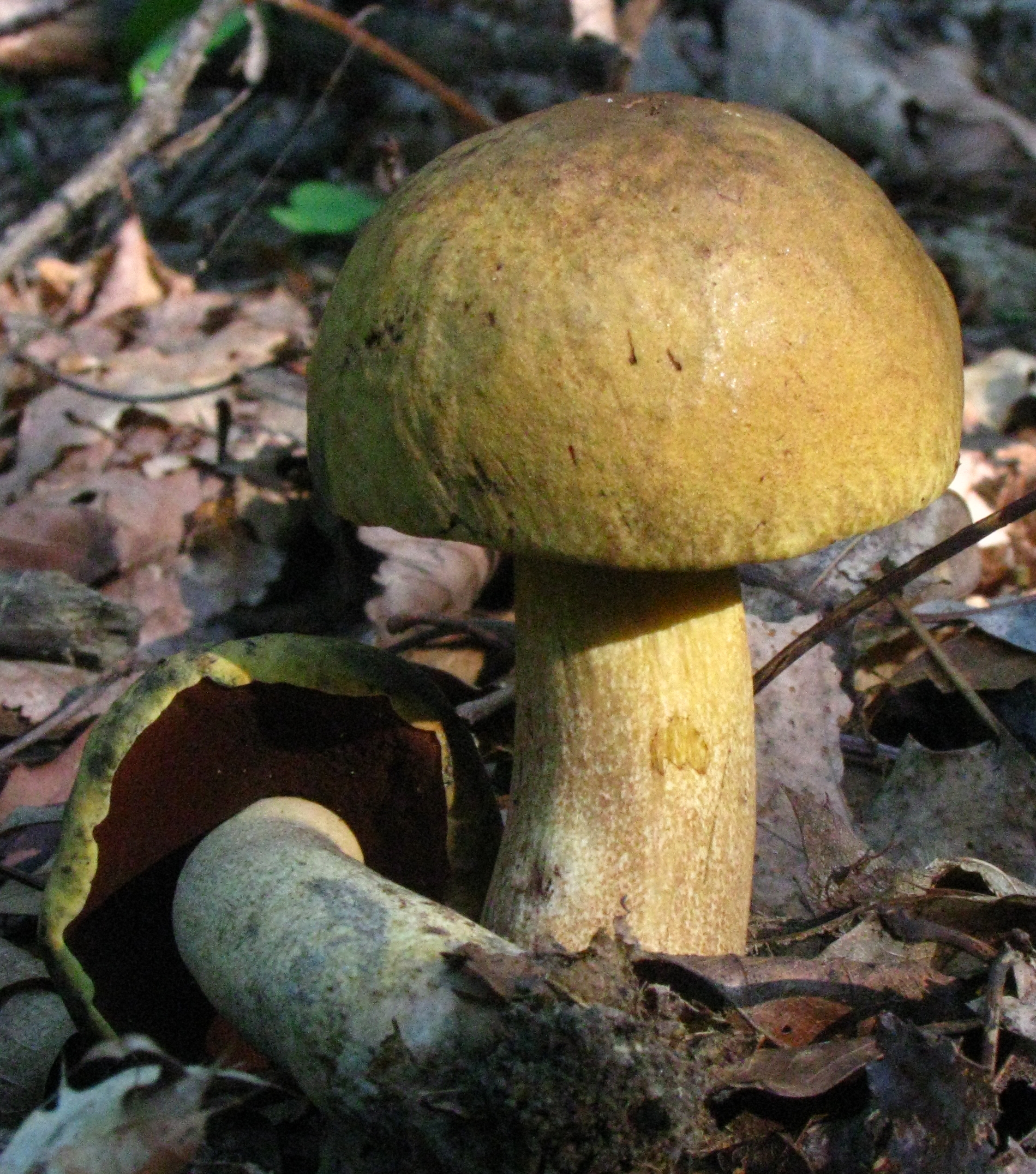

Scientific classification
- Kingdom: Fungi
- Division: Basidiomycota
- Class: Agaricomycetes
- Order: Boletales
- Family: Boletaceae
- Genus: Boletus
- Species: B. vermiculosoides

Binomial name
- Boletus vermiculosoides A.H.Sm. & Thiers (1971)

= Boletus vermiculosoides =

Species of fungus

Boletus vermiculosoides is a North American species of bolete fungus in the family Boletaceae.

== Taxonomy ==
The species was described as new to science in 1971 by mycologists Alexander H. Smith and Harry Delbert Thiers. The type collection was made by Smith in Hartland, Michigan, in 1966.

== Description ==
The tannish caps are 5–12 centimetres (2–4 3/4 in) wide. The stem is 5–12 cm tall and 1.2–2.5 cm (1/2–1 in) wide.

It can resemble (and possibly overlap with) B. durhamensis. B. vermiculosoides has pores which stain dark blue-black and flesh which stains blue when cut or bruised. The flesh and pores of B. durhamensis do not change color.

== Habitat and distribution ==
It can be found on the ground under oak in eastern North America from June to September.

== See also ==
- List of Boletus species
- List of North American boletes
