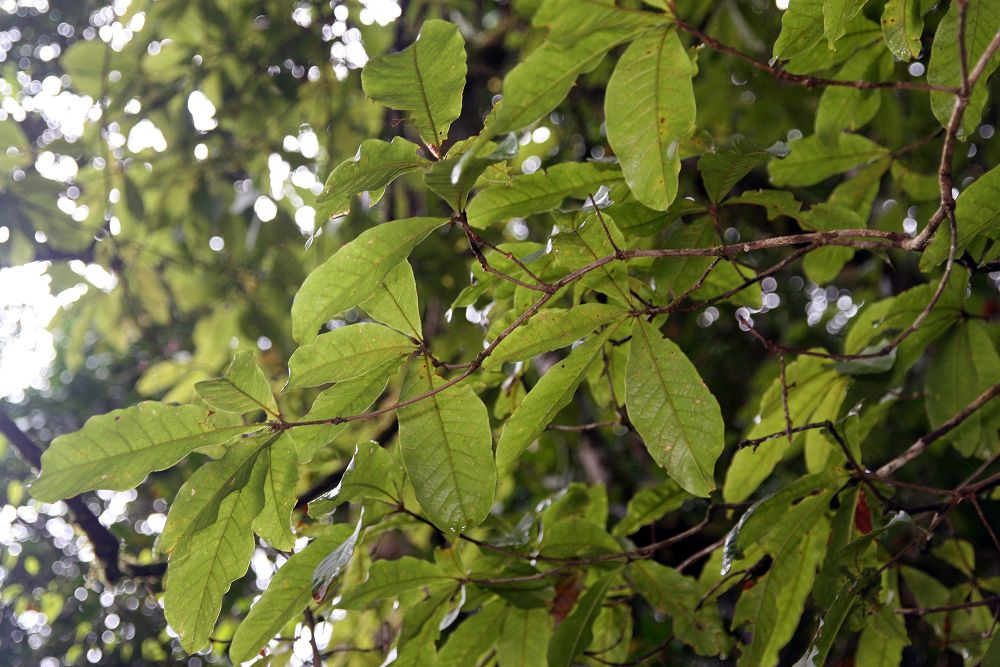

Conservation status
- Near Threatened (IUCN 3.1)

Scientific classification
- Kingdom: Plantae
- Clade: Embryophytes
- Clade: Tracheophytes
- Clade: Spermatophytes
- Clade: Angiosperms
- Clade: Eudicots
- Clade: Rosids
- Order: Fagales
- Family: Fagaceae
- Genus: Quercus
- Subgenus: Quercus subg. Quercus
- Section: Quercus sect. Lobatae
- Species: Q. benthamii

Binomial name
- Quercus benthamii A.DC.

Synonyms
- Quercus baruensis C.H.Mull.; Quercus gemmata Trel.; Quercus lowilliamsii C.H.Mull.; Quercus rapurahuensis Pittier ex Trel.; Quercus rapurahuensis Pittier ex Seem., nom. nud.; Quercus seemannii var. rapurahuensis (Pittier ex Trel.) A.E.Murray; Quercus seemannii subsp. rapurahuensis (Pittier ex Trel.) A.E.Murray; Quercus undulata Benth., nom. illeg.

= Quercus benthamii =

Species of oak tree

Quercus benthamii is a species of oak in the family Fagaceae. It is native to the cloud forests of Central America and southern Mexico. It is threatened by habitat loss.

== Description ==
Quercus benthamii is typically large evergreen tree. Mature individuals can reach up to 40 meters in height.

== Taxonomy ==
Quercus benthamii is placed in section Lobatae. The Talamanca oak, Quercus rapurahuensis Pittier ex Trel., distributed in Costa Rica and Panama, is now considered a synonym of Q. benthamii.

== Distribution and habitat ==
Quercus benthamii is a rare species, distributed in humid cloud forests from southern Mexico to western Panama.

It is sparsely distributed across its range. In Mexico it is found in the La Chinantla region of Oaxaca, located on the eastern slope of the Sierra Madre de Oaxaca, and in the Sierra Madre de Chiapas and Chiapas Highlands of Chiapas, between 1,500 and 3,000 meters elevation. It is also found in the montane cloud forest enclaves in Central America – Guatemala at 2,100 meters elevation, El Salvador at 2,500 m, Honduras from 1,800 to 2,800 meters elevation, Nicaragua from 450 to 1,700 meters elevation, Costa Rica at 2,400 m, and western Panama at 2,100 m. The estimated area of occupancy (AOO) for Q. benthamii is 584 km^{2}, which may be an under-estimate.

== Conservation ==
Quercus benthamii was assessed as "near threatened" in 2018 for the IUCN Red List. Its population trend is not known, but its habitat has been subject to continuous human disturbance across much of its range. Cloud forest enclaves have been reduced to small fragments. Threats include over-extraction of timber and firewood, cattle grazing, human-caused fires, and conversion of forest to pasture and coffee plantations. Cloud forest habitats are also threatened by climate change. Quercus rapurahuensis Pitt. ex Trel. was assessed in 1998 as "vulnerable", but has since been regarded as a synonym of Quercus benthamii.
