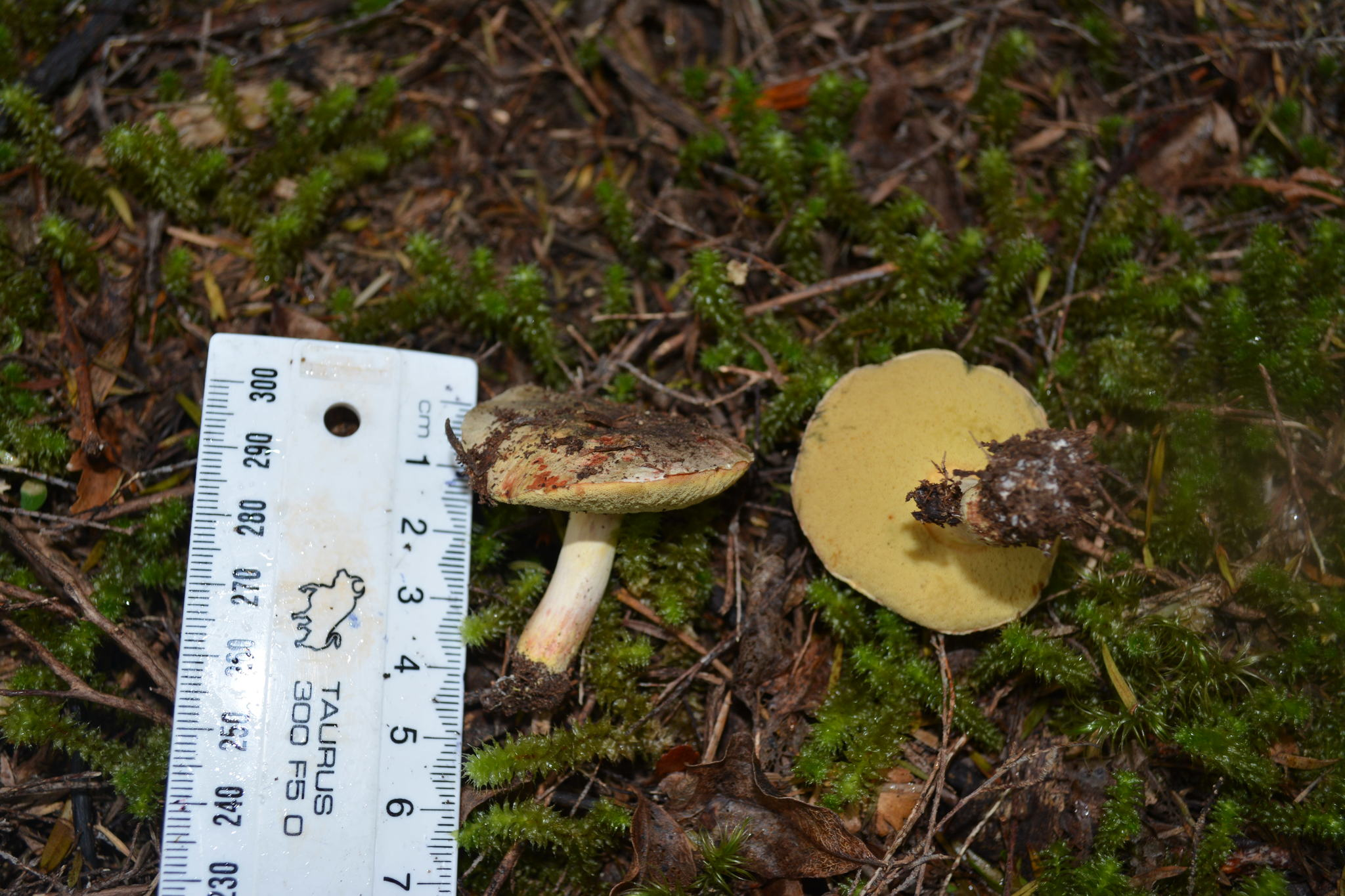

Scientific classification
- Kingdom: Fungi
- Division: Basidiomycota
- Class: Agaricomycetes
- Order: Boletales
- Family: Boletaceae
- Genus: Boletus
- Species: B. leptospermi

Binomial name
- Boletus leptospermi McNabb 1968

Synonyms
- Xerocomus leptospermi

= Boletus leptospermi =

Species of fungus

Boletus leptospermi is a fungal species in the family Boletaceae.

== Description ==
Boletus leptospermi has a cap that ranges in color from yellow-brown to reddish-brown and can grow up to 4–8 cm in diameter. The cap surface is velvety to the touch and can sometimes become cracked in dry weather. The stem is yellow and can grow up to 3–5 cm in length. The cap and stem turn blue when damaged or cut. The pores on the underside of the cap are initially dull yellow, becoming golden-yellow with age.

== Range and habitat ==
It is endemic to Aotearoa New Zealand. and commonly found in native forests throughout the North and South Islands.

== Ecology ==
Boletus leptospermi forms a symbiotic relationship with the roots of kānuka and mānuka and beech trees. The fungus likely helps the trees and shrubs to absorb nutrients from the soil in exchange for sugars produced by the tree through photosynthesis.

== Etymology ==
The specific epithet "leptospermi" is derived from the genus Leptospermum as the fungus was first described in association with Leptospermum scrub.

== Taxonomy ==
Based on molecular DNA markers, Nuhn et al. (2013) suggest that the species described by McNabb in 1968 is rather a species in the genus Xerocomus.
