= Davies Creek National Park =

National park in Queensland, Australia

- IUCN category II (national park)
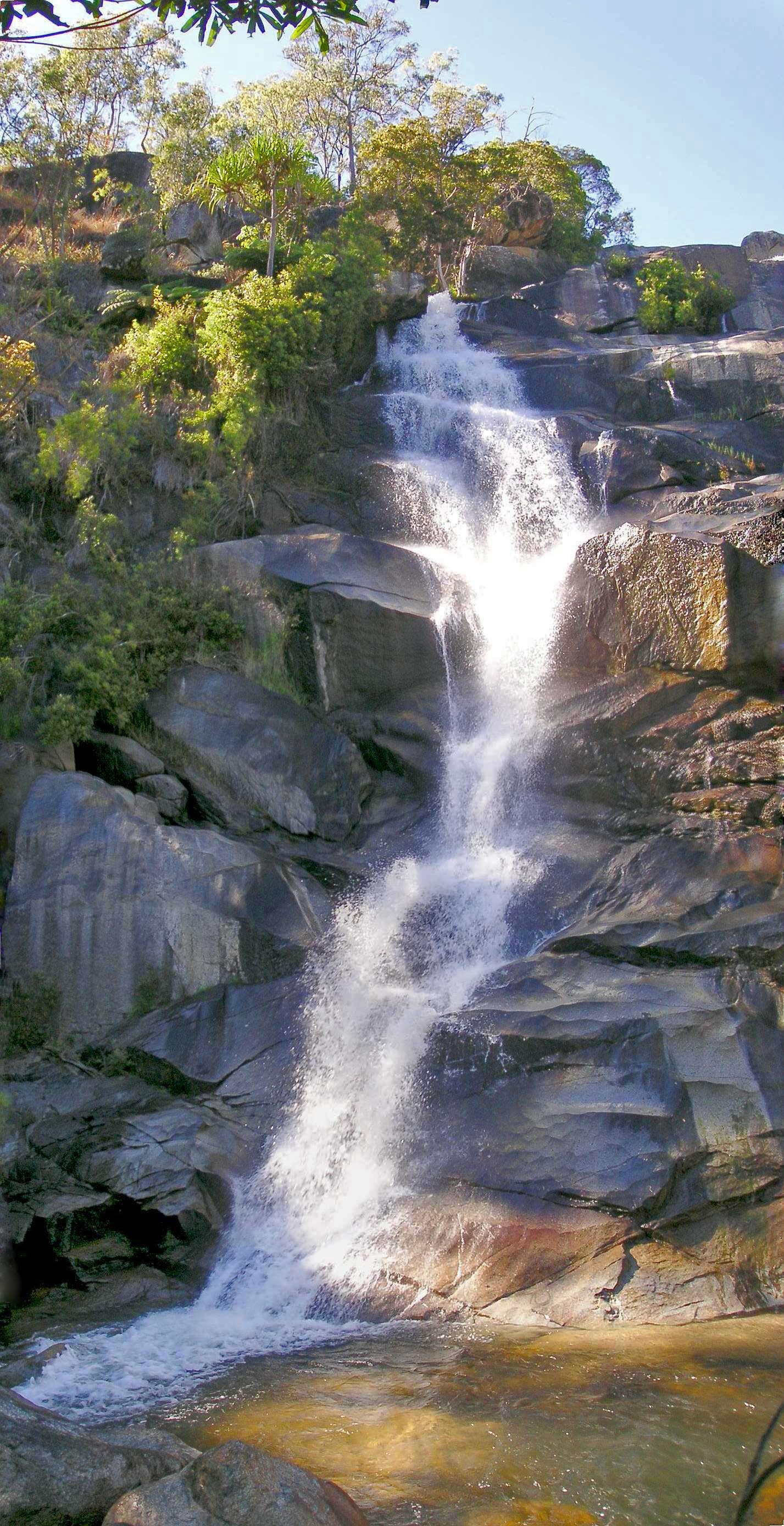
- Waterfall in the national park, 2004

- Location within Queensland
- Location: Queensland
- Nearest city: Mareeba
- Coordinates: 17°00′35″S 145°34′54″E
- Area: 4.86 km^{2} (1.88 sq mi)
- Established: 1971
- Governing body: Queensland Parks and Wildlife Service
- Website: Official website

Davies Creek National Park is in Far North Queensland, Australia, 1,392 km northwest of Brisbane, 20 km south west of Cairns. The park is located on the Atherton Tableland within the Barron River water catchment. It lies within the Einasleigh Uplands and Wet Tropics of Queensland bioregions.

It is picturesque with its granite outcrops, the Davies Creek Falls and open eucalypt woodland. Davies Creek raises in the Lamb Range and eventually flows into the Barron River. The park is important as a preserve of the northern bettong, an endangered species. A total of five rare or threatened species have been identified in the park. One of them is the bettong (rat-kangaroo) whose main population lives in this park. The world's largest bird-eating and barking spiders have been observed here, measuring up to 16 cm in diameter.

== Access ==
The park can be reached on the Kennedy Highway 21 km southwest of Kuranda.

== Facilities ==
There is a picnic area beside the creek with toilets available. The water of the creek must be boiled for at least five minutes before drinking it. There is a two km walking trail upstream that leads to the base of Davies Creek Falls.

Camping is permitted. Permits must be obtained and fees paid before arrival.

== See also ==
- Protected areas of Queensland
