= Boletus griseiceps =

Scientific classification
- Domain: Eukaryota
- Kingdom: Fungi
- Division: Basidiomycota
- Class: Agaricomycetes
- Order: Boletales
- Family: Boletaceae
- Genus: Boletus
- Species: B. griseiceps

Binomial name
- Boletus griseiceps B. Feng, Y.Y. Cui, J.P. Xu & Zhu L. Yan, 2015

Boletus griseiceps Mycological characteristics
- Pores on hymenium
- Cap is convex
- Hymenium is adnate
- Stipe is bare
- Ecology is mycorrhizal
- Edibility is edible

Boletus griseiceps is an edible basidiomycete mushroom, of the genus Boletus in the family Boletaceae. Morphologically similar to Boletus barrowsii and belonging to the porcini group (Boletus sect. Boletus), it was first described in 2015, and is known to be found only in Southeast China.

== Morphology ==
Cap

The cap is 5 to 11 cm in diameter, applanate; The surface is dry, brownish gray, covered with brownish gray tomentose squamules. The flesh is white and does not turn blue when bruised.

Pores

The pores are stuffed with white when young, becoming grayish to brownish, unchanged when bruised.

Stipe

From 9 to 10 cm long; 1.5–2.3 cm thick; clavate to subcylindrical shape; colored pale gray to pale yellowish; reticulated.

Spores

Ellipsoid to ovoid, 7–9 x 4–6 μm.

== Habitat and distribution ==
Solitary or gregarious in the Fagaceae forests in Southeast China.
