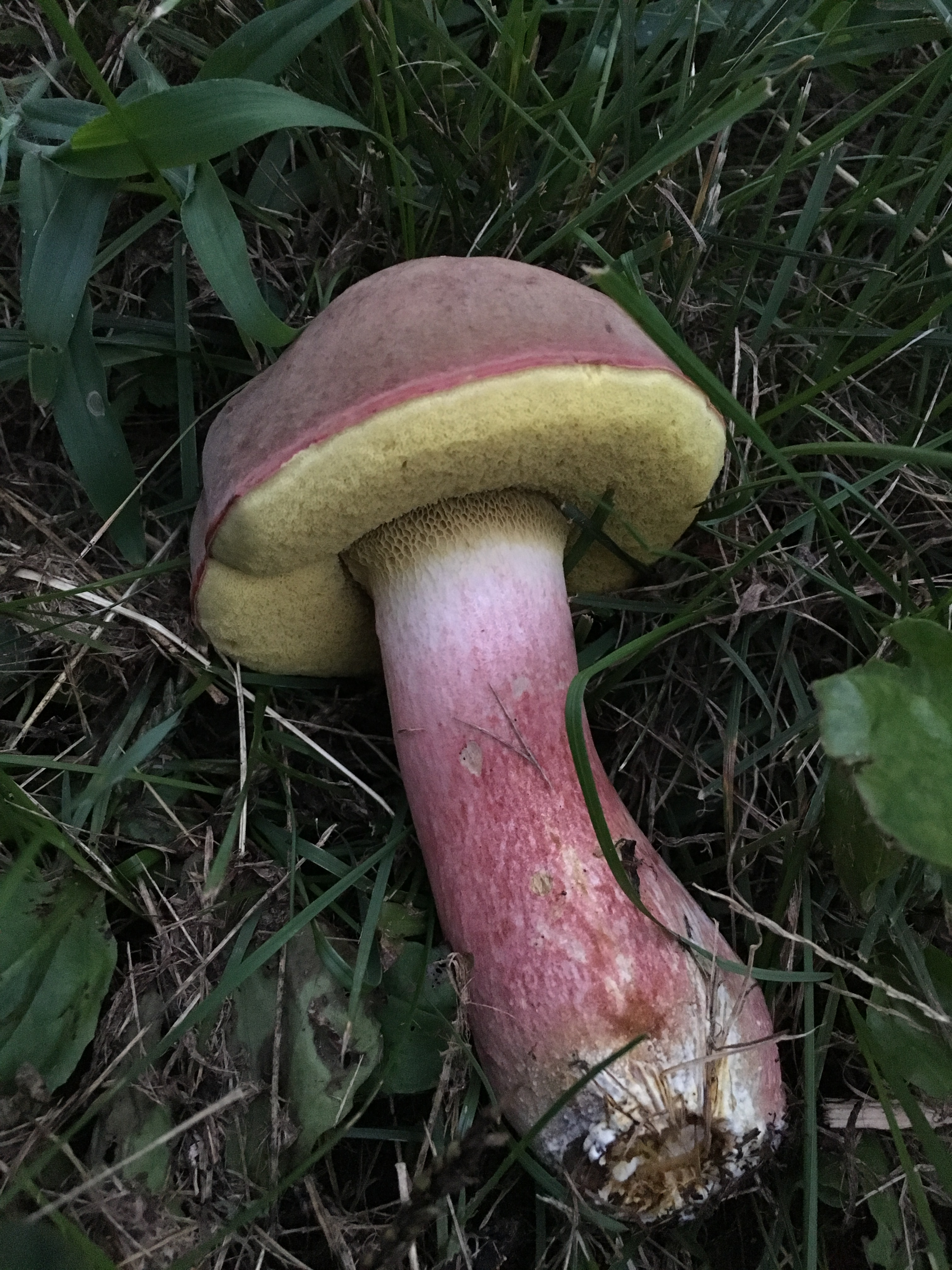

Scientific classification
- Kingdom: Fungi
- Division: Basidiomycota
- Class: Agaricomycetes
- Order: Boletales
- Family: Boletaceae
- Genus: Boletus
- Species: B. patrioticus

Binomial name
- Boletus patrioticus T. J. Baroni, Bessette & Roody, 1998

= Boletus patrioticus =

Boletus patrioticus
- Mycological characteristics
- Pores on hymenium
- Cap is convex
- Hymenium is adnate
- Stipe is bare
- Spore print is olive-brown
- Ecology is mycorrhizal
- Edibility is edible

Boletus patrioticus, also known as the patriotic bolete, is a basidiomycete mushroom, of the genus Boletus in the family Boletaceae. Its name comes from its coloration (red skin, white flesh, blue bruising) resembling the flag of the United States.

It is edible.

== Morphology ==
Cap

The cap is 3 to 13 cm in diameter, initially convex in shape, before becoming broadly convex to plane as it ages; The surface is dry with small hair, olive initially and then pinkish to dark red. The thick flesh is pale yellowish to pinkish red and does stain blue when bruised.

Pores

The pores are pale yellow when young, becoming olive yellow, bluing when bruised.

Stipe

From 2.5 to 10 cm long; 1-2 cm thick, dry, solid; rosy red on the upper part and olive on the bottom.

Spore print

The spore print is olive brown.

Spores

Subfusiform, smooth, deep golden brown, 10-13 x 4-5.5 μm

== Habitat and distribution ==
Forms mycorrhiza with hardwoods, especially oak and hickory; fruits in grassy areas, single, scattered, in summer and fall; ranging from North Carolina to Florida (south range) and to Ohio and Texas (west range).
