= Boletus roseolateritius =

Scientific classification
- Domain: Eukaryota
- Kingdom: Fungi
- Division: Basidiomycota
- Class: Agaricomycetes
- Order: Boletales
- Family: Boletaceae
- Genus: Boletus
- Species: B. roseolateritius

Binomial name
- Boletus roseolateritius Bessette, Both & Dunaway (2003)

Species of fungus

Boletus roseolateritius is a bolete fungus found in the southern United States and northeast Mexico. It was described as a new species in 2003 by Alan Bessette, Ernst Both, and Dail Dunaway. The type collection was made in Mississippi, where it was found growing on the ground under American beech (Fagus grandifolia), near hickory and oak. The bolete was reported from a Mexican beech (Fagus mexicana) forest in Hidalgo, Mexico in 2010.

The fruit body has a cap that changes color depending on its age: it is initially dark reddish to orangish, later reddish brown at maturity, fading to brownish orange or brownish pink with dull yellow tints, and finally turning dull dingy yellow in age. It has a pale yellow stipe. Its spores measure 8.5–12 by 3.5–4.5 μm.

== See also ==
- List of Boletus species
- List of North American boletes
