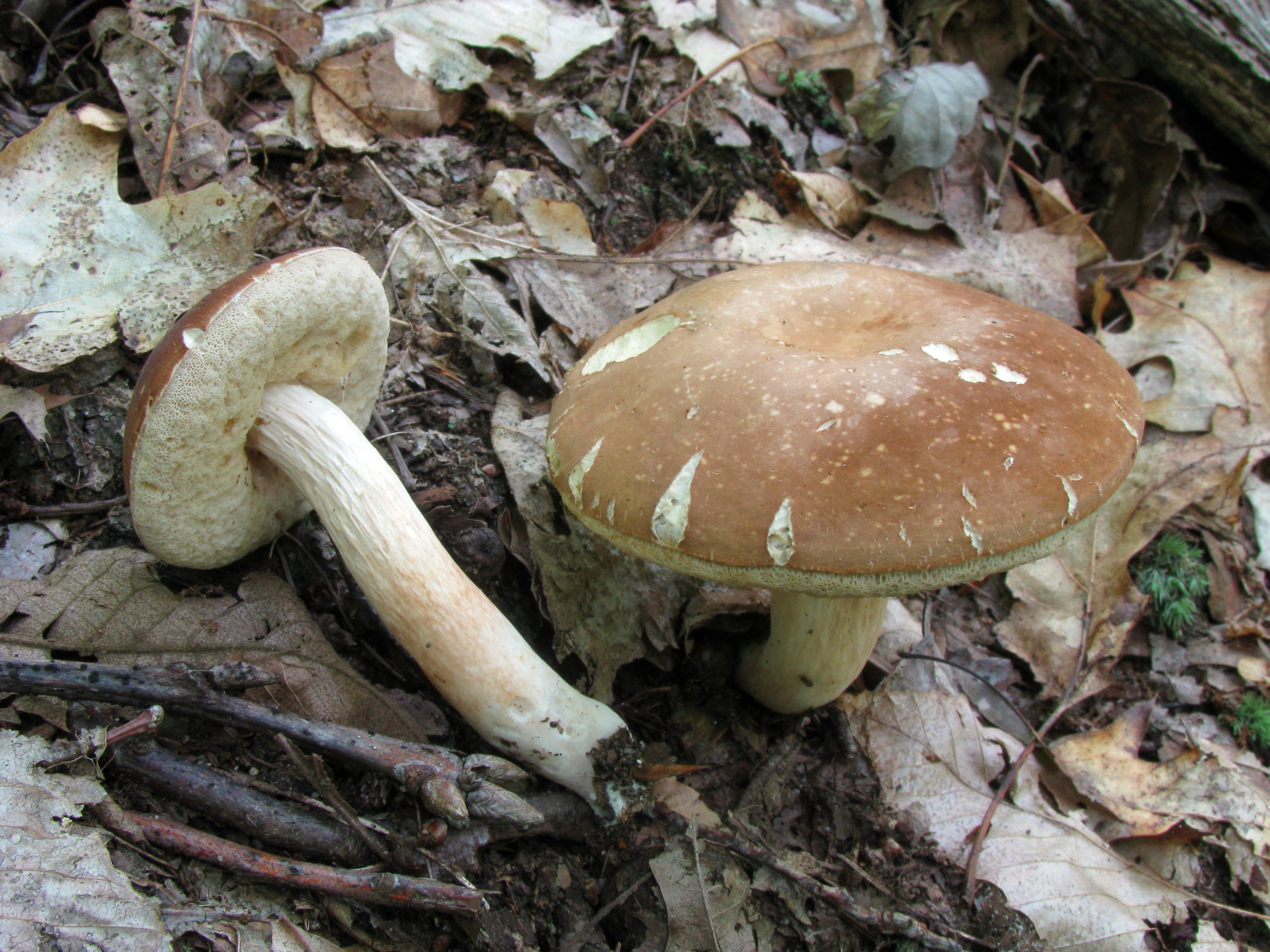

Scientific classification
- Domain: Eukaryota
- Kingdom: Fungi
- Division: Basidiomycota
- Class: Agaricomycetes
- Order: Boletales
- Family: Boletaceae
- Genus: Xanthoconium
- Species: X. affine

Binomial name
- Xanthoconium affine (Peck) Singer (1944)

Synonyms
- Boletus affinis Peck (1873)

= Xanthoconium affine =

Species of fungus

Xanthoconium affine is a species of bolete fungus of the genus Xanthoconium. First described as a species of Boletus by Charles Horton Peck in 1873, it was placed in its current genus by Rolf Singer in 1944.

The convex cap is 3.5–9 centimetres (1 1/2–3 1/2 in) wide and brownish. The pores are whitish, darkening with age. The stem is 3.5–9 cm tall and 1–2 cm thick. The flesh is white with a mild scent. The spore print is yellowish brown.

It may resemble X. purpureum, Boletus separans, and Tylopilus felleus.

It can be found under oak and beech trees in eastern North America from June to September.

The species is regarded as edible.

== See also ==
- List of North American boletes
