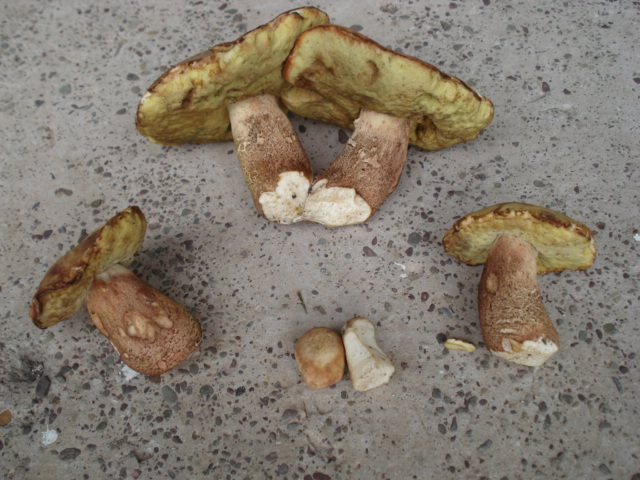

Scientific classification
- Domain: Eukaryota
- Kingdom: Fungi
- Division: Basidiomycota
- Class: Agaricomycetes
- Order: Boletales
- Family: Boletaceae
- Genus: Boletus
- Species: B. subcaerulescens

Binomial name
- Boletus subcaerulescens (E.A. Dick & Snell) Both, Bessette, & A.R. Bessette 2000

Synonyms
- Boletus edulis subsp. subcaerulescens E.A. Dick & Snell 1965; Boletus edulis f. subcaerulescens (E.A. Dick & Snell) Vassilkov 1966; Boletus separans var. subcaerulescens (E.A. Dick & Snell) A.H.Sm. & Thiers 1971

= Boletus subcaerulescens =

Species of fungus

Boletus subcaerulescens Mycological characteristics
- Pores on hymenium
- Cap is convex
- Hymenium is adnexed
- Stipe is bare
- Spore print is olive-brown
- Ecology is mycorrhizal
- Edibility is unknown

Boletus subcaerulescens is a basidiomycete fungus of the genus Boletus found in northeastern North America. The fruiting bodies are found associated with pine and spruce. The cap is up to 18 cm wide, convex to flat, and brown in color. The tubes are yellow and stain blue (later becoming brown) when bruised, while the flesh is white to buff and does not stain when cut. The stem is brown like the cap and has a light-colored reticulate texture.

The specific epithet is from Latin: sub- + caeruleus + -escens, literally "becoming dark blue beneath".

Phylogenetic analysis has shown B. subcaerulescens as a member of a clade, or closely related group, with B. pinophilus, B. regineus, B. rex-veris, B. fibrillosus, and Gastroboletus subalpinus.

== See also ==
- List of Boletus species
- List of North American boletes
