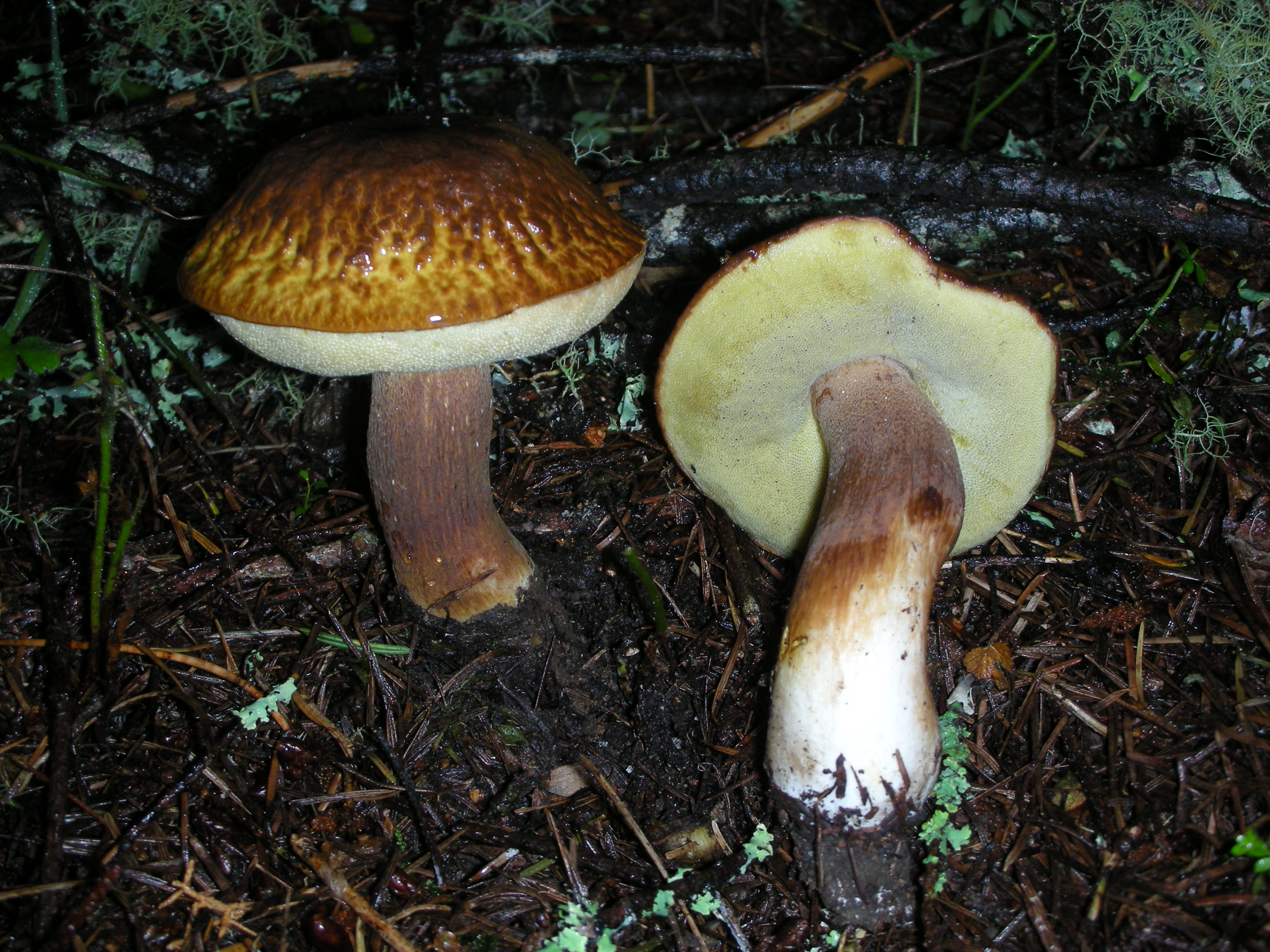

Scientific classification
- Domain: Eukaryota
- Kingdom: Fungi
- Division: Basidiomycota
- Class: Agaricomycetes
- Order: Boletales
- Family: Boletaceae
- Genus: Boletus
- Species: B. fibrillosus

Binomial name
- Boletus fibrillosus Thiers 1975

= Boletus fibrillosus =

Species of fungus

Boletus fibrillosus Mycological characteristics
- Pores on hymenium
- Cap is convex
- Hymenium is adnexed
- Stipe is bare
- Spore print is olive-brown
- Ecology is mycorrhizal
- Edibility is edible

Boletus fibrillosus, commonly known as the fib king, is a basidiomycete fungus of the genus Boletus. The holotype was collected in Mendocino County, California. Phylogenetic analysis has shown it to be a member of a clade (closely related group) with B. pinophilus, B. regineus, B. rex-veris, B. subcaerulescens, and Gastroboletus subalpinus.

The cap is up to 17 centimetres (6 1/2 in) wide and buff to brown to dark brown, with a wrinkled to finely fibrous texture. The tubes are yellow, while the flesh is white to buff and does not stain when cut. The stem is up to 16 cm long, yellowish at the top, brown otherwise, with a reticulate texture, and mycelium enshrouding the bottom.

The species has only been found in western North America. The fruiting bodies are found in mixed coastal forests in the fall, usually singly or in small groups. It is edible, but considered to have inferior taste to other edible boletes such as B. edulis, which it is often confused with.

== See also ==
- List of Boletus species
- List of North American boletes
