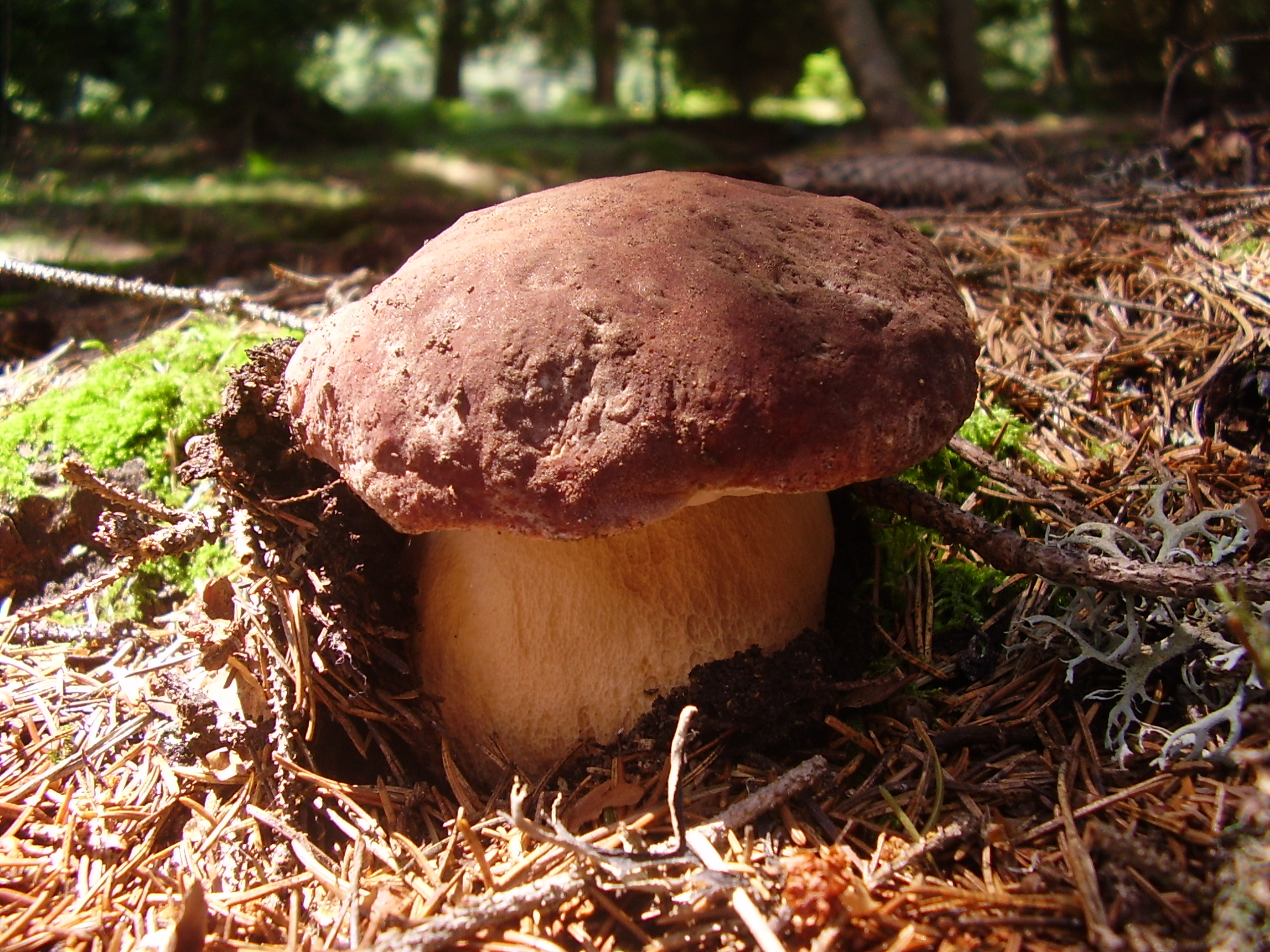

Scientific classification
- Kingdom: Fungi
- Division: Basidiomycota
- Class: Agaricomycetes
- Order: Boletales
- Family: Boletaceae
- Genus: Boletus
- Species: B. pinophilus

Binomial name
- Boletus pinophilus Pilát & Dermek (1973)

Synonyms
- Boletus aestivalis var. pinicola (Vittad.) Sacc; Boletus edulis var. pinicola Vitt.; Boletus edulis f. pinicola (Vittad.) Vassilkov; Boletus pinicola (Vitt.) Venturi; Boletus vinosulus (Kluzák, Papoušek & Šutara)

= Boletus pinophilus =

Pine bolete mushroom

Boletus pinophilus
- Mycological characteristics
- Pores on hymenium
- Cap is convex
- Hymenium is adnexed
- Stipe is bare
- Spore print is olive-brown
- Ecology is mycorrhizal
- Edibility is choice

Boletus pinophilus, commonly known as the pine bolete or pinewood king bolete, is a basidiomycete fungus of the genus Boletus. Described by Italian naturalist Carlo Vittadini in 1835, B. pinophilus was for many years considered a subspecies or form of the porcini mushroom B. edulis before genetic studies confirmed its distinct status. In 2008, B. pinophilus in western North America were reclassified as a new species, B. rex-veris.

The fungus produces spore-bearing fruit bodies (i.e. mushrooms) above ground under pine trees in summer and autumn. It has a red-brown to maroon-coloured cap and a large and bulbous stipe, covered with coarse orange-red reticulation. As with other boletes, the size of the fruiting body is variable.

The fungus is found throughout Europe and western Asia. It grows predominantly in coniferous forests on sandy soil, forming ectomycorrhizal associations in symbiosis with living trees by enveloping the tree's underground roots with sheaths of fungal tissue. Host trees include various species of pine, the European silver fir and European spruce, as well as deciduous trees such as chestnut trees, oak and beech. B. pinophilus is edible, and may be preserved and cooked.

== Taxonomy ==
Italian naturalist Carlo Vittadini was the first to recognise the pine bolete as a distinct taxon, describing it as B. edulis var. pinicola in 1835. It was raised to species status (as B. pinicola) by Antonio Venturi in 1863. Pier Andrea Saccardo treated it as a variety of Boletus aestivalis in 1910. It gained its current name in 1973, described by Czech mycologists Albert Pilát and Aurel Dermek. A new binomial name had to be coined as B. pinicola as authored by Venturi was invalid due that name having been previously applied to fungus now known as Fomitopsis pinicola. The specific epithet is a mix of Latin pinus "pine", and Ancient Greek philus "loving". B. pinophilus is classified in Boletus section Boletus; genetic analysis of European members in this group confirmed it is close to but genetically distinct from B. edulis and proposed maintaining its status as a separate species.

In 2008, a taxonomic revision of western North American populations of this species was published, formally establishing them as a distinct species, B. rex-veris. Populations from eastern North America under pine have been reclassified as a new species B. pseudopinophilus. Conversely, B. vinosulus—described from the Czech Republic in 1992—has been since synonymised to this species.

Phylogenetic analysis has shown B. pinophilus as a member of a clade, or closely related group, with the North American species B. subcaerulescens, B. subalpinus, B. regineus, B. fibrillosus, and B. rex-veris. Despite the diverse appearances, these taxa are close genetically, leading Feng and colleagues to speculate on combining the first four taxa above as a single species. These four diverged from the lineage that gave rise to B. fibrillosus and B. rex-veris around 5 million years ago; the common ancestor of all these diverged from the ancestor of B. edulis around 10 million years ago.

The British Mycological Society approved the name "pine bolete" for B. pinophilus. Other common names include red king bolete, the pinewood king bolete, and cèpe des pins ("pine tree cep").

== Description ==
The fruiting body has a convex-shaped cap, at first small in relation to its stipe, expanding in volume as it matures. The skin of the cap is dry, matte and can be coloured from maroon to chocolate brown with a reddish tint. It is thicker than other porcini-like boletes and is gelatinous. These characteristics distinguish it visually from relatives such as Boletus edulis, B. reticulatus and B. aereus. The young, immature cap may have a pale pink colour and a white, powdery flush.

As with all boletes, the size of the fruiting body can vary greatly. The cap diameter can be as much as 40 centimetres (16 inches), the stem height 25 cm (10 in) and stem diameter 16 cm (6 1/4 in). The bulbous stipe is often swollen and has a network pattern, which is much coarser in this species than other porcinis. The overall colour may have an orange-red tinge which is more obvious in the lowest parts, although this is also common in other species. Like other boletes, B. pinophilus has small pores on the underside of its cap rather than gills. These are coloured white at first, becoming yellow with age and olive-brown at full maturity. The spores are cylindric-ellipsoid, smooth, with oil drops and dimensions 15.5–20 by 4.5–5.5 μm. They produce an olive-brown spore print.

== Distribution and habitat ==
Boletus pinophilus is the rarest of the porcini-like mushrooms in Europe, though is found across temperate regions. It is found in Britain, where it is more common in Scotland, and in France, where it is more common in the south, Leningrad Oblast and Vologda Oblast in Russia, and Ukraine. The bolete is considered vulnerable in the Czech Republic. It extends into Asia Minor and southwestern Asia, specifically as far as the Perm Krai in central Russia, and Irkutsk Oblast in Siberia. It is also found in exotic pine plantations (such as Pinus sylvestris) in eastern North America, Mexico, Chile, South Africa and New Zealand. Native populations from China and North America have been mostly confirmed as other distinct species.

== Ecology ==
B. pinophilus forms ectomycorrhizal relationships in symbiosis with pine (Pinus) species such as stone pine (P. cembra), black pine (P. nigra), Corsican pine (P. nigra subsp. laricio), cluster pine (P. pinaster), Monterey pine (P. radiata), Scots pine (P. sylvestris) and P. uncinata, as well as European silver fir (Abies alba) and European spruce (Picea abies). It can therefore be located wherever those trees grow, particularly with Scots pine in Britain, preferring the poor, acidic, and sandy soils associated with coniferous forests. It appears to favour Pinus, while the form of the mushroom occurring in association with Abies and Picea has been labeled B. pinophilus var. fuscoruber. However, it is not confined to coniferous trees and may also be found fruiting in deciduous forests, such as under chestnut trees (Castanea sativa), oak (Quercus spp.), beech (Fagus sylvatica), and possibly birch (Betula spp.) and hornbeam (Carpinus spp.).

Fruiting bodies can occur singly, or in small groups throughout the summer and autumn months, although they are known to appear as early as April in Italy. A 2007 field study on four species of boletes revealed little correlation between the abundance of fruit bodies and presence of its mycelia below ground, even when soil samples were taken from directly beneath the mushroom; the study concluded that the triggers leading to formation of mycorrhizae and production of the fruit bodies appear to be more complex than previously thought.

== Uses ==
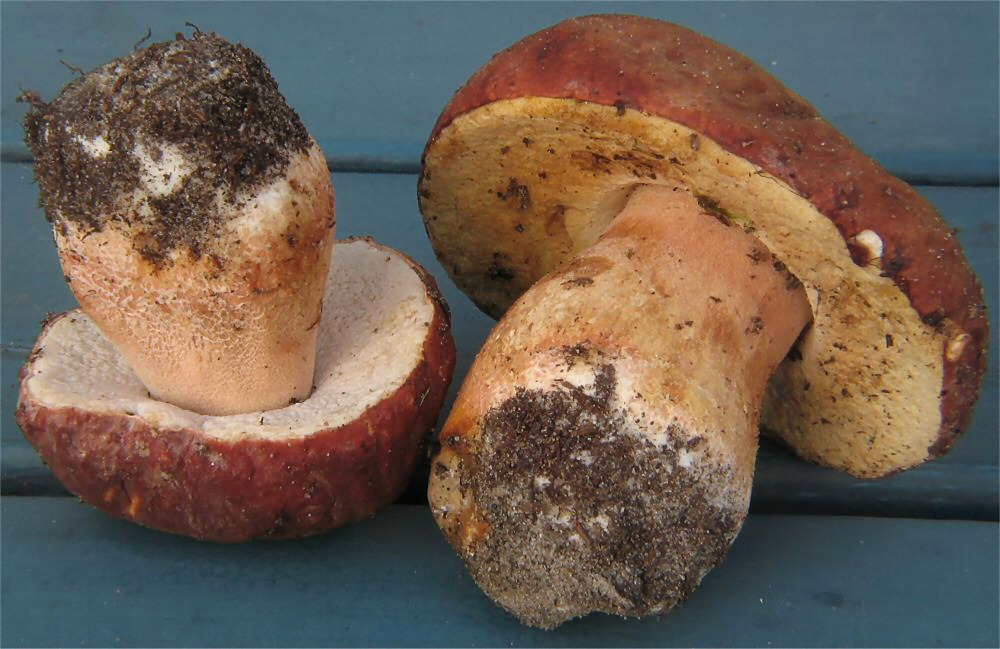
Undersides of collected specimens

Boletus pinophilus is edible and may be used fresh, preserved, dried and cooked in a manner similar to that of other edible boletes. It is highly regarded and can be quite expensive in central Mexico, and is often sold dried there. The flesh is white, soft in mature specimens and does not change colour upon bruising. The taste and smell is pleasant. People of La Malinche have likened the flavour to pork and pork crackling. It is easily misidentified as the porcini B. edulis, due to the similar habitat and appearance. It is a highly regarded food item, especially across the southern European regions of Portugal, the Basque Country and Navarre in Spain, France, Italy, Bulgaria and Serbia. In the vicinity of Borgotaro in the province of Parma of northern Italy, the four species B. edulis, B. aereus, B. reticulatus, and B. pinophilus have been recognised for their superior taste and officially termed Fungo di Borgotaro. Here, these mushrooms have been collected and exported commercially for centuries. It is a commonly eaten mushroom in Turkey, especially in the Marmara and Western Black Sea regions, and is exported to Europe. It is sold commercially in Finland.

Fresh mushrooms are up to 90% water, and rich in carbohydrates. Unsaturated alcohols are a major component of the aroma of porcini mushrooms; 1-Octen-3-ol, 2-octen-1-ol, 3-Octanone, (E)-2-octenal, oct-1-en-3-one and 1,7,7-trimethyl-heptan-2-one, 2-propenoic acid and 1,3-octadiene are the main volatile compounds in B. pinophilus. B. pinophilus is known to be a bioaccumulator of the heavy metals mercury, cadmium and selenium. To reduce exposure, authorities recommend avoiding mushrooms from polluted areas such as those near mines, smelters, roadways, incinerators and disposal sites. Furthermore, pores should be removed as they contain the highest concentrations of pollutants.
