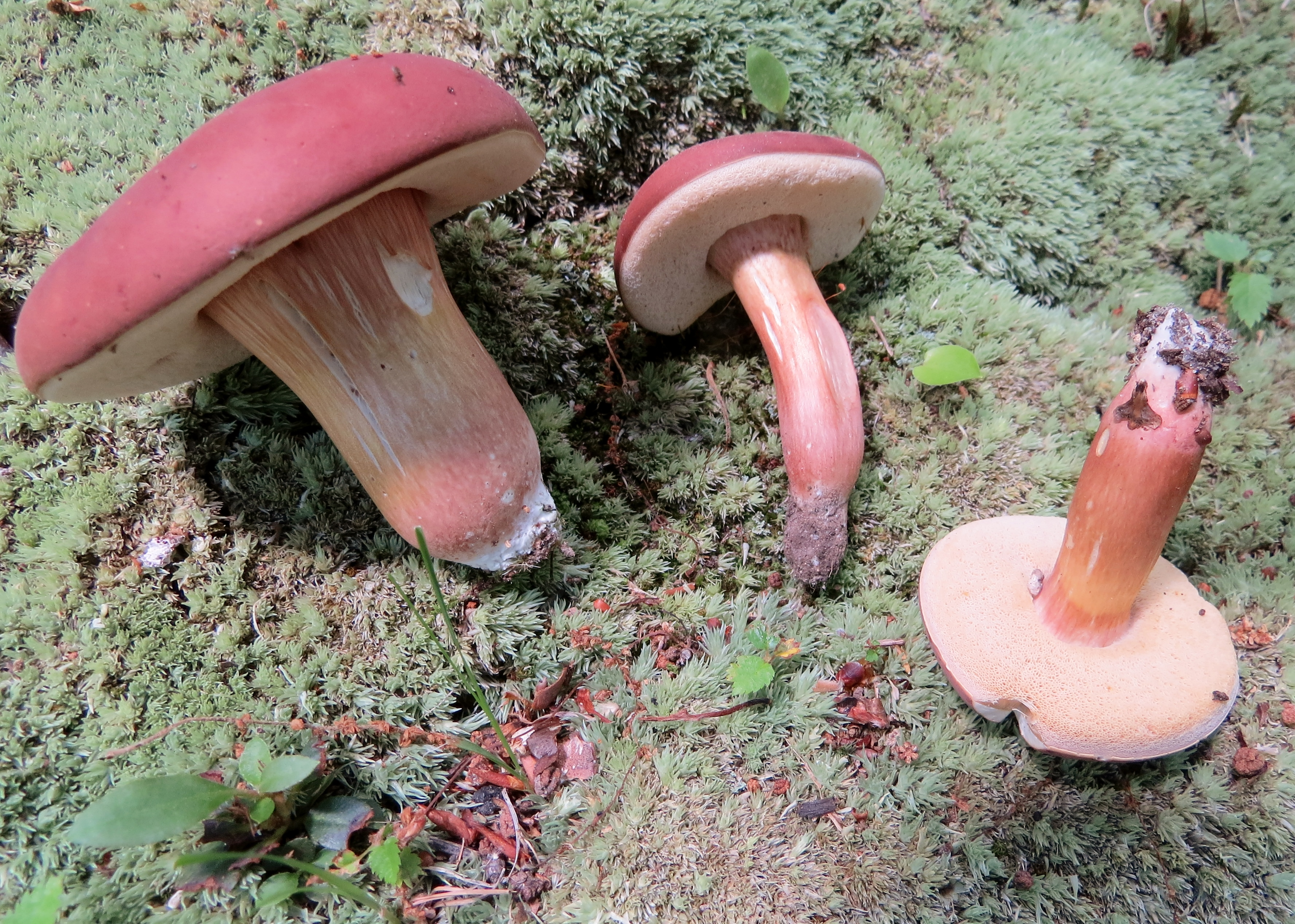
- Xanthoconium purpureum

Scientific classification
- Kingdom: Fungi
- Division: Basidiomycota
- Class: Agaricomycetes
- Order: Boletales
- Family: Boletaceae
- Genus: Xanthoconium; Singer (1944)

Type species
- Xanthoconium stramineum (Murrill) Singer (1944)

= Xanthoconium =

Genus of fungi

Xanthoconium is a genus of bolete fungi in the family Boletaceae. It was circumscribed by mycologist Rolf Singer in 1944, who included Boletus affinis and what was then known as Gyroporus stramineus as the type species. These two species were part of the "strange group of species described by Murrill and Snell as white-spored Gyropori, and separated by the latter under the new generic name Leucogyroporus." C.B. Wolfe described three species from the United States in 1987: X. chattoogaense, Xanthoconium montaltoense, and X. montanum. As of February 2015, the nomenclatural database Index Fungorum list seven species in Xanthoconium.

The concept of Xanthoconium has been not fully described using molecular phylogenetic analysis, but it is clearly a distinct genus, apart from Boletus. However, Xanthoconium separans was found to be more closely related to Boletus Sensu stricto than to Xanthoconium.

== Species ==
Image	Scientific name	Taxon author	Year	Distribution
	Xanthoconium affine	(Peck) Singer	1944	hardwood forests east of the Rocky Mountains, and in Mexico
	Xanthoconium chattoogaense	Wolfe	1987	Known only from the type locality, along a tributary of the Chattooga River in North Carolina.
	Xanthoconium fusciceps	N.K. Zeng, Zhi Q. Liang & S. Jiang	2017	China
	Xanthoconium montaltoense	Wolfe	1987	Found in south-central Pennsylvania.
	Xanthoconium montanum	Wolfe	1987	Found in Macon County, North Carolina, in Nantahala National Forest.
	Xanthoconium porophyllum	G. Wu & Zhu L. Yang	2016	China
	Xanthoconium purpureum	Snell & E.A.Dick	1962	eastern North America
	Xanthoconium sinense	G. Wu, Y.Y. Cui & Zhu L. Yang	2016	China
	Xanthoconium stramineum	(Murrill) Singer	1944	eastern North America
