= Boletus recapitulatus =

Scientific classification
- Domain: Eukaryota
- Kingdom: Fungi
- Division: Basidiomycota
- Class: Agaricomycetes
- Order: Boletales
- Family: Boletaceae
- Genus: Boletus
- Species: B. recapitulatus

Binomial name
- Boletus recapitulatus D. Chakr., K. Das, Baghela, S.K. Singh & Dentinger

Species of fungus

Boletus recapitulatus is a species of bolete fungus found in Sikkim in northeastern India.
