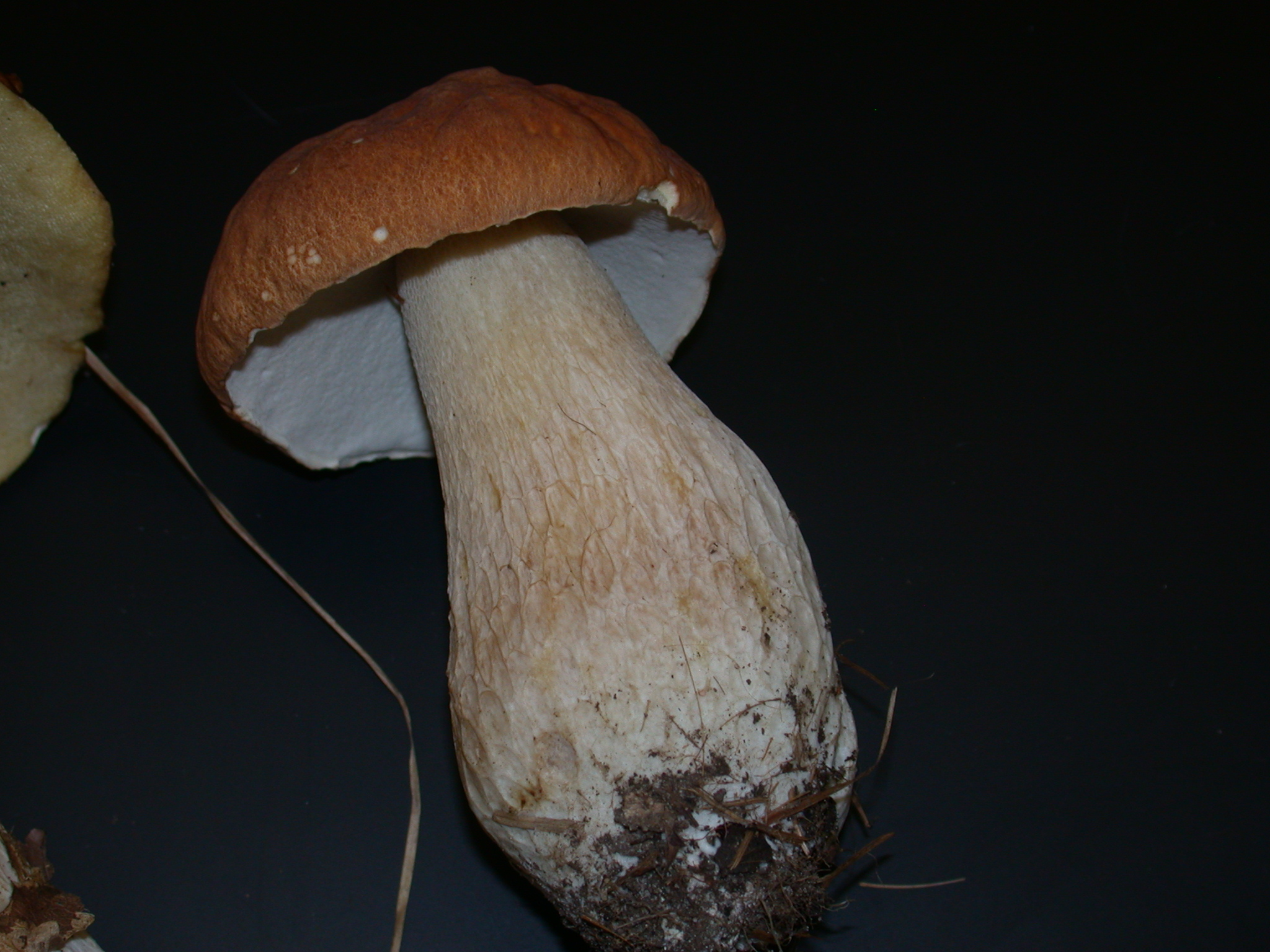

Scientific classification
- Kingdom: Fungi
- Division: Basidiomycota
- Class: Agaricomycetes
- Order: Boletales
- Family: Boletaceae
- Genus: Boletus
- Species: B. nobilissimus

Binomial name
- Boletus nobilissimus Both & R.Riedel, 2000

= Boletus nobilissimus =

Boletus nobilissimus
- Mycological characteristics
- Pores on hymenium
- Cap is convex
- Hymenium is adnate
- Stipe is bare
- Spore print is brown
- Ecology is mycorrhizal
- Edibility is edible

Boletus nobilissimus is an edible basidiomycete mushroom, of the genus Boletus in the family Boletaceae. Long considered a variety of European Boletus edulis, it has become a species on its own in 2000, with 2010 molecular study finding that it is most closely related to B. atkinsonii, B. quercophilus of Costa Rica and then B. barrowsii of western United States. It is found in abundance in open oak forests after heavy rains and warm weather (30 °C or more).

== Morphology ==
Cap

The cap is 9.5 to 15 cm in diameter, initially convex in shape, before becoming broadly convex to plane as it ages; The surface is dry with small hair, yellow brown to vinaceous brown, and then dark brown. The thick flesh is white and does not turn blue when bruised.

Pores

The pores are white when young, becoming yellowish or brownish yellow to greenish olivaceous, unchanged when bruised.

Stipe

From 8 to 12 cm long; 1–3 cm thick, dry, solid; whitish or brownish; club shaped to bulbous with strongly raised reticulation.

Spore print

The spore print is yellowish-brown.

Spores Ellipsoid to subfusiform, smooth, pale yellow, 11.5–13.5 x 4–5 μm.

== Habitat and distribution ==
Forms mycorrhiza with hardwoods, especially oak and beech in presence of pines; single, scattered, or gregarious, in summer and fall; collected in New England, New York, and other Eastern parts of United States, with distribution limits unknown.
