= Boletus subviolaceofuscus =

Scientific classification
- Domain: Eukaryota
- Kingdom: Fungi
- Division: Basidiomycota
- Class: Agaricomycetes
- Order: Boletales
- Family: Boletaceae
- Genus: Boletus
- Species: B. subviolaceofuscus

Binomial name
- Boletus subviolaceofuscus B. Feng, Y.Y. Cui, J.P. Xu & Zhu L. Yan, 2015

Boletus subviolaceofuscus Mycological characteristics
- Pores on hymenium
- Cap is convex
- Hymenium is adnate
- Stipe is bare
- Ecology is mycorrhizal
- Edibility is edible

Boletus subviolaceofuscus is an edible basidiomycete mushroom, of the genus Boletus in the family Boletaceae. Morphologically similar to Boletus violaceofuscus and belonging to the porcini group (Boletus sect. Boletus), it was first described in 2015, and is known to be found only in China, Yunnan.

== Morphology ==
Cap

The cap is 4 to 8 cm in diameter, initially convex in shape, before becoming broadly convex to plane as it ages; The surface is dry with small hair, dark purple to vinaceous brown. The flesh is white and does not turn blue when bruised.

Pores

The pores are whitish when young, becoming cream to yellowish, unchanged when bruised.

Stipe

From 4.5 to 10 cm long; 1.2–1.5 cm thick; concolorous or paler than the pileus; reticulated; shaped clavate to subcylindrical.

Spores

Subfusiform, 16–18.5 x 4.5–6 μm.

== Habitat and distribution ==
Solitary or gregarious in the Lithocarpus forests in Southwest China.
