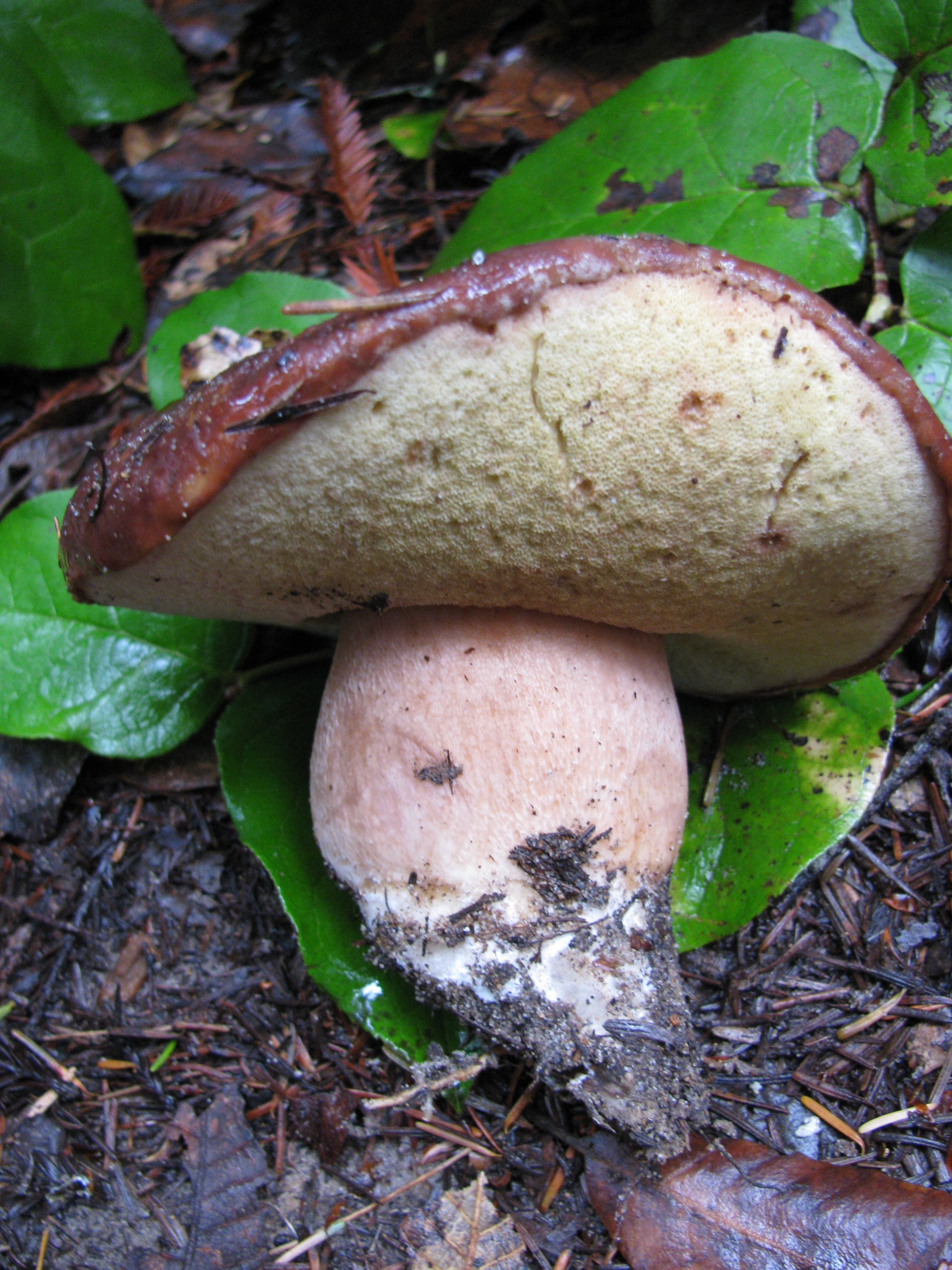
- From Little River (Mendocino County), California

Scientific classification
- Kingdom: Fungi
- Division: Basidiomycota
- Class: Agaricomycetes
- Order: Boletales
- Family: Boletaceae
- Genus: Boletus
- Species: B. regineus

Binomial name
- Boletus regineus D.Arora & Simonini (2008)

= Boletus regineus =

Species of fungus

Boletus regineus Mycological characteristics
- Pores on hymenium
- Cap is convex
- Hymenium is adnate
- Stipe is bare
- Spore print is olive
- Ecology is mycorrhizal
- Edibility is choice

Boletus regineus, commonly known as the queen bolete, is an edible and highly regarded fungus of the genus Boletus that inhabits southwestern North America. It was considered a variant of the similarly edible B. edulis for many years until declared a unique species in 2008. Phylogenetic analysis has shown B. regineus as a member of a clade, or closely related group, with B. subcaerulescens, Gastroboletus subalpinus, B. pinophilus, B. fibrillosus, and B. rex-veris.

The cap is 5–18 cm (2–7 in) wide, convex then flat, brown with a whitish dusting when young. The stalk is 5–15 cm long, 3–6 cm wide, clavate then equal, and whitish tan.

== See also ==
- List of Boletus species
