= Boletus pseudopinophilus =

Scientific classification
- Domain: Eukaryota
- Kingdom: Fungi
- Division: Basidiomycota
- Class: Agaricomycetes
- Order: Boletales
- Family: Boletaceae
- Genus: Boletus
- Species: B. pseudopinophilus

Binomial name
- Boletus pseudopinophilus A.R. Bessette, Bessette, J. Craine & J.L. Frank

Species of fungus

Boletus pseudopinophilus is a species of porcini-like fungus native to eastern North America, where it grows under Pinus elliottii and Pinus palustris. Previously regarded as Boletus pinophilus it was found to have diverged significantly from the latter species.
