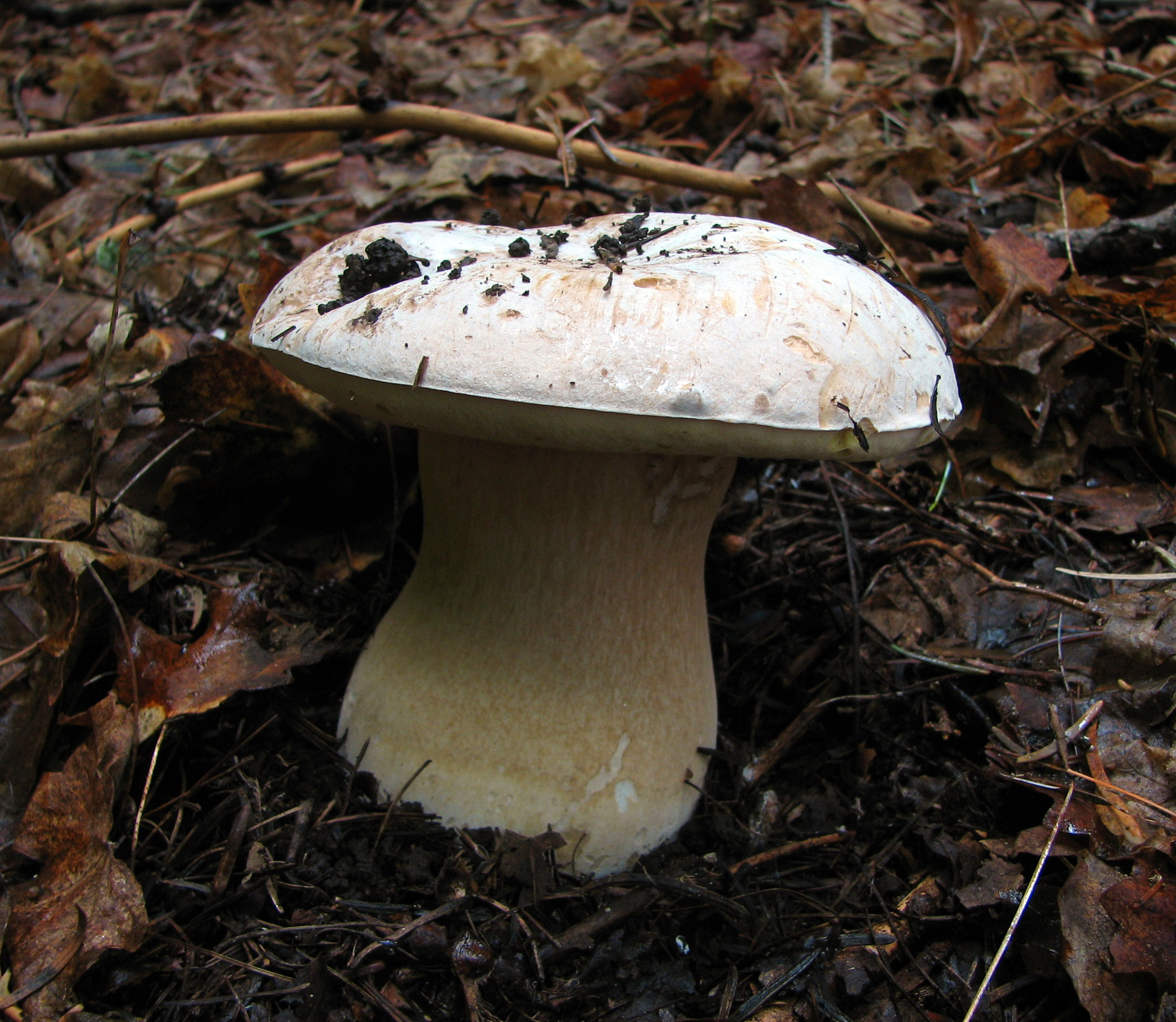
- Boletus barrowsii, San Luis Obispo County, California

Scientific classification
- Domain: Eukaryota
- Kingdom: Fungi
- Division: Basidiomycota
- Class: Agaricomycetes
- Order: Boletales
- Family: Boletaceae
- Genus: Boletus
- Species: B. barrowsii

Binomial name
- Boletus barrowsii Thiers & A.H.Sm. (1976)

= Boletus barrowsii =

Species of fungus

Boletus barrowsii Mycological characteristics
- Pores on hymenium
- Cap is convex
- Hymenium is adnate
- Stipe is bare
- Spore print is olive
- Ecology is mycorrhizal
- Edibility is choice

Boletus barrowsii, also known in English as the white king bolete after its pale colored cap, is a species of fungus in the genus Boletus. It was formerly considered a color variant of B. edulis.

It can be found under ponderosa pine and live oak in western North America during autumn. It is edible and highly regarded.

== Taxonomy ==
The species was officially described by American mycologists Harry D. Thiers and Alexander H. Smith in 1976 from a specimen collected near Jacob Lake, Arizona, on August 21, 1971, by amateur mycologist Charles "Chuck" Barrows, who had studied the mushroom in New Mexico. It was previously held to be a white colour form of B. edulis. A 2010 molecular study found that B. barrowsii was sister to a lineage that gave rise to the species B. quercophilus of Costa Rica and B. nobilissimus of eastern North America.

== Description ==
The cap is 5–25 centimetres (2–10 inches) in diameter, initially convex in shape before flattening, with a smooth or slightly tomentose surface, and gray-white, white or buff color. The thick flesh is white and does not stain blue when bruised. The pores are initially whitish, later yellow. The stout stipe is white with a brown reticulated pattern, and may be 6–20 cm (2 1/2–8 in) high with an apical diameter of 2–6 cm (1–2 in). The spores are elliptical to spindle-shaped and 13–15 x 4–5 μm in dimensions; they produce an olive-brown spore print.

Like B. edulis, it is often found eaten by maggots. It has a strong odor while drying.

=== Similar species ===
In addition to B. edulis, the species could also be confused with the similarly pale-capped B. satanas, though the flesh of the latter stains blue when cut or bruised, and it has a reddish stem and pores. The latter species is poisonous when raw.

Caloboletus marshii is also similar.

== Habitat and distribution ==
The white king bolete is ectomycorrhizal, found under Pinus ponderosa (ponderosa pine) inland, and Quercus agrifolia (coast live oak) closer to the west coast. Fruit bodies appear after rain, and will be more abundant if this occurs in early autumn rather than later in the year through to winter. It is abundant in the warmer parts of its range, namely Arizona and New Mexico, but also occurs in Colorado, west into California and north to British Columbia. It has been recorded from the San Marcos Foothills in Santa Barbara County.

== Uses ==
The species is edible and highly regarded in New Mexico, Arizona, and Colorado. It was eaten for many years while assumed to be a form of B. edulis.

== See also ==
- List of Boletus species
- List of North American boletes
