= Boletus umbrinipileus =

Scientific classification
- Domain: Eukaryota
- Kingdom: Fungi
- Division: Basidiomycota
- Class: Agaricomycetes
- Order: Boletales
- Family: Boletaceae
- Genus: Boletus
- Species: B. umbrinipileus

Binomial name
- Boletus umbrinipileus B. Feng, Y.Y. Cui, J.P. Xu & Zhu L. Yan, 2015

Boletus umbrinipileus Mycological characteristics
- Pores on hymenium
- Cap is convex
- Hymenium is adnate
- Stipe is bare
- Ecology is mycorrhizal
- Edibility is edible

Boletus umbrinipileus is an edible basidiomycete mushroom, of the genus Boletus in the family Boletaceae. Morphologically similar to Boletus phaeocephalus and belonging to the porcini group (Boletus sect. Boletus), it was first described in 2015, and is known to be found only in China, Yunnan.

== Morphology ==
Cap

The cap is 4.5 to 7 cm in diameter, initially plano-convex in shape, before becoming applanate as it ages; The surface is dry with small hair, brownish gray to olivaceous brown, sometimes with paler, grayish to grayish white margin. The flesh is white and does not turn blue when bruised.

Pores

The pores are stuffed with white when young, becoming pallid yellow with slightly olivaceous tinge, unchanged when bruised.

Stipe

From 8.5 to 10 cm long; 0.8–1.5 cm thick; subcylindrical shape; upper two-thirds colored brownish to grayish brown and covered with whitish reticulations which become more enlongated downward; lower one-third colored dirty white to white and not reticulated.

Spores

Subfusiform, 10–13 x 3.5–4 μm.

== Habitat and distribution ==
Solitary or gregarious in the subtropical Fagaceae forests in Southwest China.
