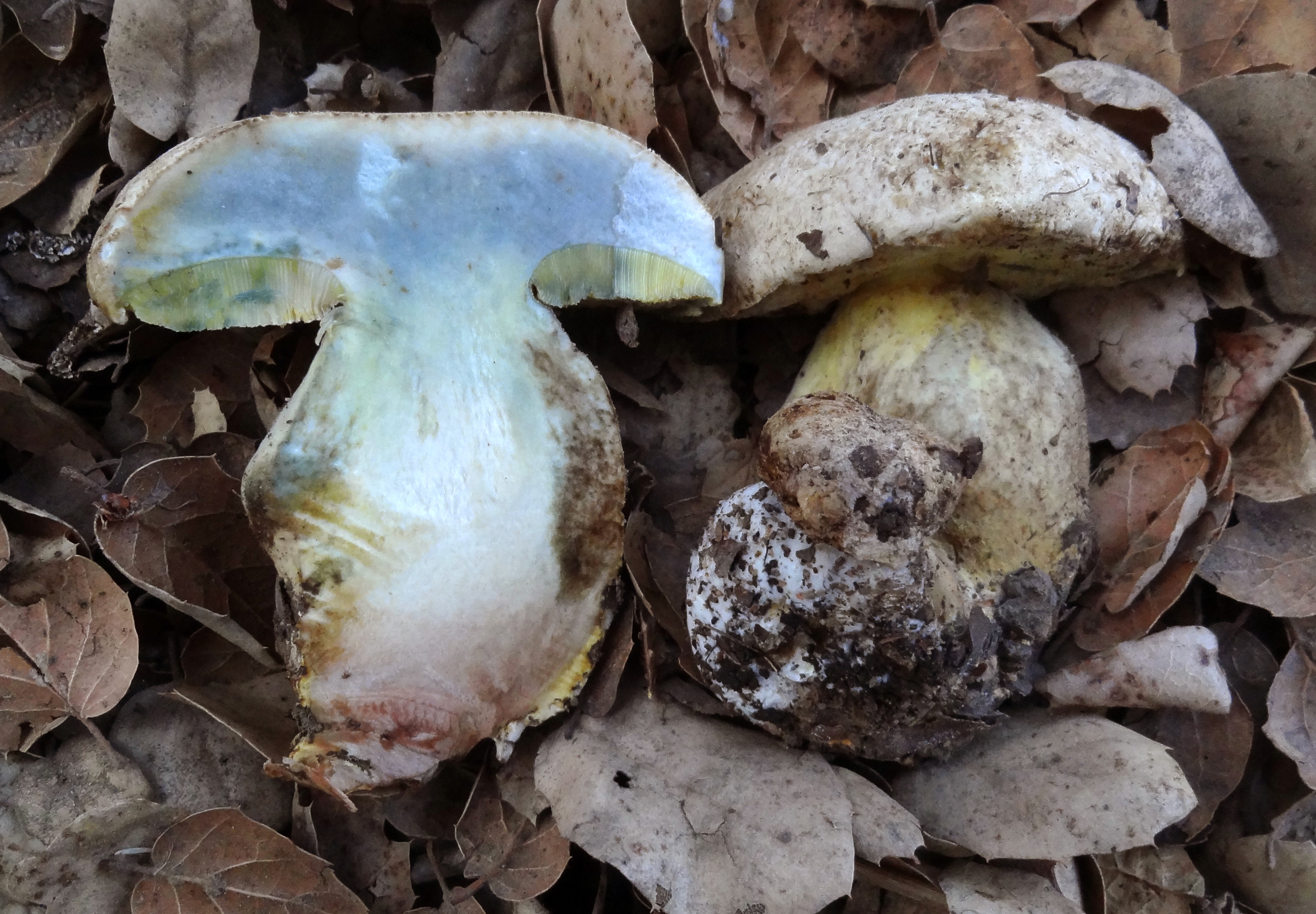

Conservation status
- Least Concern (IUCN 3.1)

Scientific classification
- Kingdom: Fungi
- Division: Basidiomycota
- Class: Agaricomycetes
- Order: Boletales
- Family: Boletaceae
- Genus: Caloboletus
- Species: C. marshii

Binomial name
- Caloboletus marshii D. Arora, C.F. Schwarz, J.L. Frank

= Caloboletus marshii =

Species of mushroom

- Mycological characteristics
- Pores on hymenium
- Cap is convex
- Stipe is bare
- Spore print is olive-brown
- Ecology is mycorrhizal
- Edibility is inedible

Caloboletus marshii, commonly known as Ben's bitter bolete, is a species of mushroom in the family Boletaceae. It is not poisonous, but it is too bitter to eat. It turns blue when cut or bruised, and it grows under live oak.

== Taxonomy ==
Caloboletus marshii was first unofficially described by David Arora as Boletus "marshii" in his book Mushrooms Demystified, which was first published in 1979 and later revised in 1986. In 2014, Jonathan L. Frank formally described the species as Caloboletus marshii.

== Description ==
The cap of Caloboletus marshii is about 2-6 inches (6-15 cm) across, and the stipe is about 1-4 inches (3-10 cm) long and 0.7-4 inches (3-10 cm) wide. The pore surface and the flesh are yellow, and quickly turn blue when bruised or cut.

=== Similar species ===
Caloboletus marshii can be confused with the brown butter bolete, Butryiboletus persolidus. It can also be confused with the white king bolete, Boletus barrowsii, which doesn't bruise blue as much as Caloboletus marshii.

== Habitat and ecology ==
Caloboletus marshii is a mycorrhizal fungus that grows under live oaks in California, Oregon, and Washington. It fruits in late summer and fall, often before the rains come. It is rarely found fruiting in November.

== Edibility and discovery ==
Caloboletus marshii is inedible due to its extremely bitter taste. However, this didn't stop a man named Ben Marsh from repeatedly trying to make it edible. This brought the mushroom to David Arora's attention, and he named it after Ben Marsh.

== See also ==
- List of North American Boletes
