= Boletus monilifer =

Scientific classification
- Domain: Eukaryota
- Kingdom: Fungi
- Division: Basidiomycota
- Class: Agaricomycetes
- Order: Boletales
- Family: Boletaceae
- Genus: Boletus
- Species: B. monilifer

Binomial name
- Boletus monilifer B. Feng, Yang Y. Cui, J.P. Xu & Zhu L. Yang

Species of fungus

Boletus monilifer is a species of porcini-like fungus native to Yunnan Province in Southwestern China, where it grows under trees of the genera Lithocarpus, Quercus and Castanopsis in subtropical montane forests.
