= Boletus fagacicola =

Scientific classification
- Domain: Eukaryota
- Kingdom: Fungi
- Division: Basidiomycota
- Class: Agaricomycetes
- Order: Boletales
- Family: Boletaceae
- Genus: Boletus
- Species: B. fagacicola

Binomial name
- Boletus fagacicola B.Feng, Yang Y.Cui, J.P.Xu & Zhu L.Yang

Species of fungus

Boletus fagacicola is a species of porcini-like fungus native to China, where it grows under trees of the family Fagaceae.
