= Xanthoconium chattoogaense =

Scientific classification
- Domain: Eukaryota
- Kingdom: Fungi
- Division: Basidiomycota
- Class: Agaricomycetes
- Order: Boletales
- Family: Boletaceae
- Genus: Xanthoconium
- Species: X. chattoogaense

Binomial name
- Xanthoconium chattoogaense Wolfe (1987)

Species of fungus

Xanthoconium chattoogaense is a species of bolete fungus in the genus Xanthoconium. Described as new to science in 1987, it is found in North Carolina, where it grows on sandy soil under Quercus alba, Quercus rubra, Acer rubrum, and Rhododendron maximum. The specific epithet refers to the Chattooga River, close to which the type collection was found.

== See also ==
- List of North American boletes
