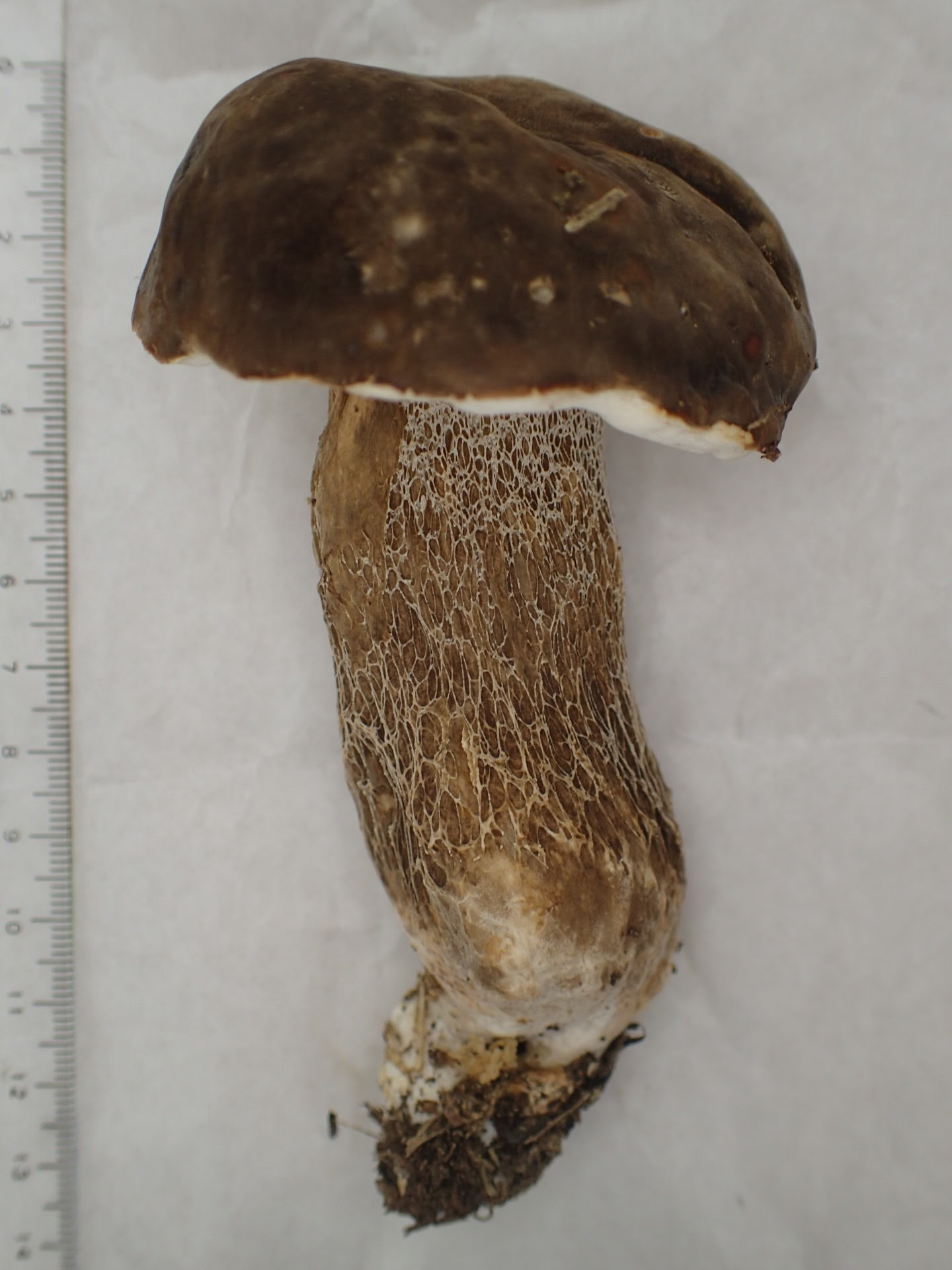
- Boletus hiratsukae

Scientific classification
- Kingdom: Fungi
- Division: Basidiomycota
- Class: Agaricomycetes
- Order: Boletales
- Family: Boletaceae
- Genus: Boletus
- Species: B. hiratsukae

Binomial name
- Boletus hiratsukae Eiji Nagasawa (1994)

= Boletus hiratsukae =

Species of fungus

Boletus hiratsukae is a basidiomycete fungus of the genus Boletus found in Japan. Described by Japanese mycologist Eiji Nagasawa in 1994, it is named after Naohide Hiratsuka. It is characterized by a grey-purple then brown pileipellis and a reticulated stem near the hymenium. It is close to Boletus edulis.

== Description ==
B. hiratsukae is identified by a dark brown to sooty color of both the pileus and stipe, a "dry, pruinose-subvelutinous pileus without any rugosity throughout its development," and a "palisade trichodermium structure of pileipellis" where hyphae often form a bead-like structure with short, inflated terminal and sub-terminal cells.

The pileus is 5 to 13 cm in length and is occasionally depressed when old. The stem is purplish gray but turns distinctly dark gray to brown with age. The flesh is white, also when cut, with no distinct smell. The stipe is dark brown, reticulated with white veins towards the top of the stipe.

=== Related species ===
Populations of Boletus variipes found east of the Rocky Mountains are sister species to B. hiratsukae, with B. variipes from Central America and southeastern North America sister to the combined lineage. Within the genus Boletus, B. hiratsukae resembles B. aereus and B. variipes Pk. var. fagicola.

== Habitat and distribution ==
B. hiratsukae is rarely solitary and has been known to reside near conifers.

== Ecology ==
=== Mycorrhizal associations ===
B. hiratsukae may form mycorrhizal relationships with members of Pinaceae, particularly P. abies and P. pinus.

=== Radioactive cesium activity ===
A study investigating the spatial distribution of radiocaesium in wild mushrooms and soil contaminated by the Fukushima accident concluded that the concentration of radiocaesium in B. hiratsukae did not rely on the distance between the mushrooms.

== See also ==
List of Boletus species
