= Boletus orientialbus =

Scientific classification
- Domain: Eukaryota
- Kingdom: Fungi
- Division: Basidiomycota
- Class: Agaricomycetes
- Order: Boletales
- Family: Boletaceae
- Genus: Boletus
- Species: B. orientialbus

Binomial name
- Boletus orientialbus N.K. Zeng & Zhu L. Yang

Species of fungus

Boletus orientialbus is a species of porcini-like fungus native to Fujian Province in Southeastern China, where it grows under trees of the genera Lithocarpus and Castanopsis in subtropical climates.
