= Xanthoconium montaltoense =

Scientific classification
- Domain: Eukaryota
- Kingdom: Fungi
- Division: Basidiomycota
- Class: Agaricomycetes
- Order: Boletales
- Family: Boletaceae
- Genus: Xanthoconium
- Species: X. montaltoense

Binomial name
- Xanthoconium montaltoense Wolfe (1987)

Species of fungus

Xanthoconium montaltoense is a species of bolete fungus in the genus Xanthoconium. Described as new to science in 1987, it is found in Pennsylvania, where it grows on soil under Betula lenta and Tsuga canadensis. The specific epithet montaltoense refers to Mont Alto campus of Pennsylvania State University, close to the type locality.

== See also ==
- List of North American boletes
