= Xanthoconium montanum =

Scientific classification
- Domain: Eukaryota
- Kingdom: Fungi
- Division: Basidiomycota
- Class: Agaricomycetes
- Order: Boletales
- Family: Boletaceae
- Genus: Xanthoconium
- Species: X. montanum

Binomial name
- Xanthoconium montanum Wolfe (1987)

Species of fungus

Xanthoconium montanum is a species of bolete fungus in the genus Xanthoconium. Described as new to science in 1987, it is found in North Carolina, where it grows on sandy soil under Pinus strobus, Tsuga canadensis, and Rhododendron maximum. The specific epithet montanum refers to the location of the type collection, in the mountains of southwestern North Carolina.

== See also ==
- List of North American boletes
