= Boletus botryoides =

Scientific classification
- Kingdom: Fungi
- Division: Basidiomycota
- Class: Agaricomycetes
- Order: Boletales
- Family: Boletaceae
- Genus: Boletus
- Species: B. botryoides

Binomial name
- Boletus botryoides B. Feng, Yang Y. Cui, J.P. Xu & Zhu L. Yang

Species of fungus

Boletus botryoides is a species of porcini-like fungus native to Hunan Sichuan and Yunnan Provinces in Central China, where it grows under trees of the family Fagaceae.
