= Boletus sinoedulis =

Scientific classification
- Kingdom: Fungi
- Division: Basidiomycota
- Class: Agaricomycetes
- Order: Boletales
- Family: Boletaceae
- Genus: Boletus
- Species: B. sinoedulis

Binomial name
- Boletus sinoedulis B. Feng, Y.Y. Cui, J.P. Xu & Zhu L. Yan, 2015

Boletus sinoedulis
- Mycological characteristics
- Pores on hymenium
- Cap is convex
- Hymenium is adnate
- Stipe is bare
- Ecology is mycorrhizal
- Edibility is edible

Boletus sinoedulis is an edible basidiomycete mushroom, of the genus Boletus in the family Boletaceae. Morphologically similar to Boletus edulis and belonging to the porcini group (Boletus sect. Boletus), it was first described in 2015, and is restricted to subapline conifer forests of Southwestern China.

== Morphology ==
Cap

The cap is 10 to 12 cm in diameter, initially convex in shape, before becoming broadly convex to plane as it ages; The surface is dry with small hair, yellowish brown to dark brown. The flesh is white and does not turn blue when bruised.

Pores

The pores are white when young, becoming yellowish to yellowish brown, unchanged when bruised.

Stipe

From 9 to 10 cm long; 1.2–1.5 cm thick; white to pale gray to yellowish; reticulated; shaped clavate to subcylindrical.

Spores

Subfusiform, 14–17.5 x 5–6.5 μm.

== Habitat and distribution ==
Solitary or gregarious in the subalpine conifer forests dominated by spruce or fir in Southwest China.
