= Boletus tylopilopsis =

Scientific classification
- Kingdom: Fungi
- Division: Basidiomycota
- Class: Agaricomycetes
- Order: Boletales
- Family: Boletaceae
- Genus: Boletus
- Species: B. tylopilopsis

Binomial name
- Boletus tylopilopsis B. Feng, Y.Y. Cui, J.P. Xu & Zhu L. Yang, 2015

Boletus tylopilopsis
- Mycological characteristics
- Pores on hymenium
- Cap is convex
- Hymenium is adnate
- Stipe is bare
- Ecology is mycorrhizal
- Edibility is edible

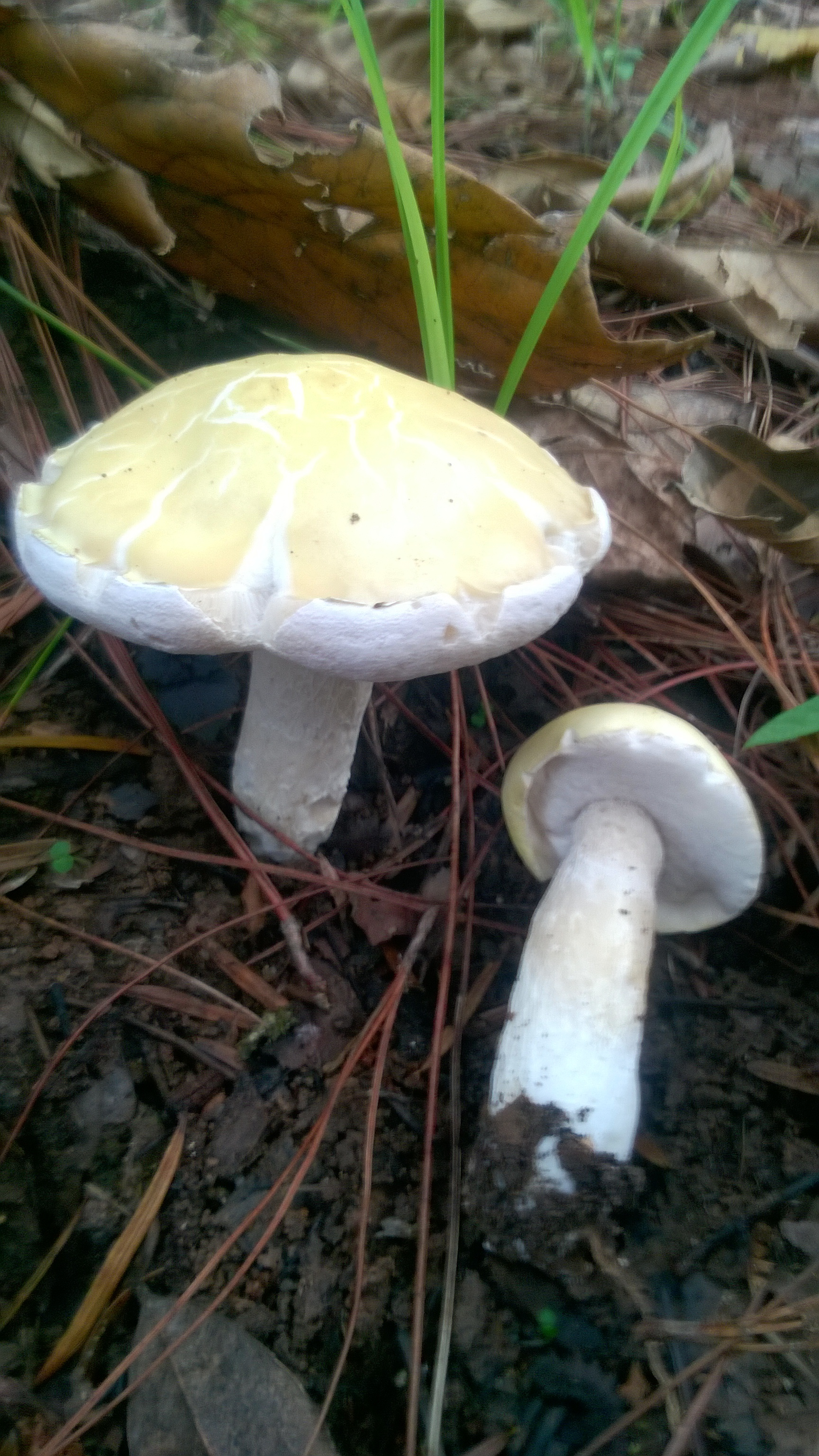
Two Boletus tylopilopsi

Boletus tylopilopsis is an edible basidiomycete mushroom, of the genus Boletus in the family Boletaceae. Morphologically similar to the members of Tylopilus in the pinkish hymenophore and belonging to the porcini group (Boletus sect. Boletus), it was first described in 2015, and is known to be found only in China, Yunnan.

== Morphology ==
Cap

The cap is 8.5 to 10.5 cm in diameter, hemispherical in shape; The surface is dry and distinctly rugose, dull yellow to yellow with olivacous tinge. The flesh is cream to yellowish in color and does not turn blue when bruised.

Pores

The pores are white-stuffed when young, becoming pinkish like those of Tylopilus spp., unchanged when bruised.

Stipe

From 9 to 12 cm long; 1.5–2.2 cm thick; yellowish with reticulations concolorous to the pileus; shaped clavate to subcylindrical, tapered upwards.

Spores

Subfusiform, 12.5–15 x 4.5–5.5 μm.

== Habitat and distribution ==
Solitary or gregarious in the subtropical Fagaceae forests in Southwest China.
