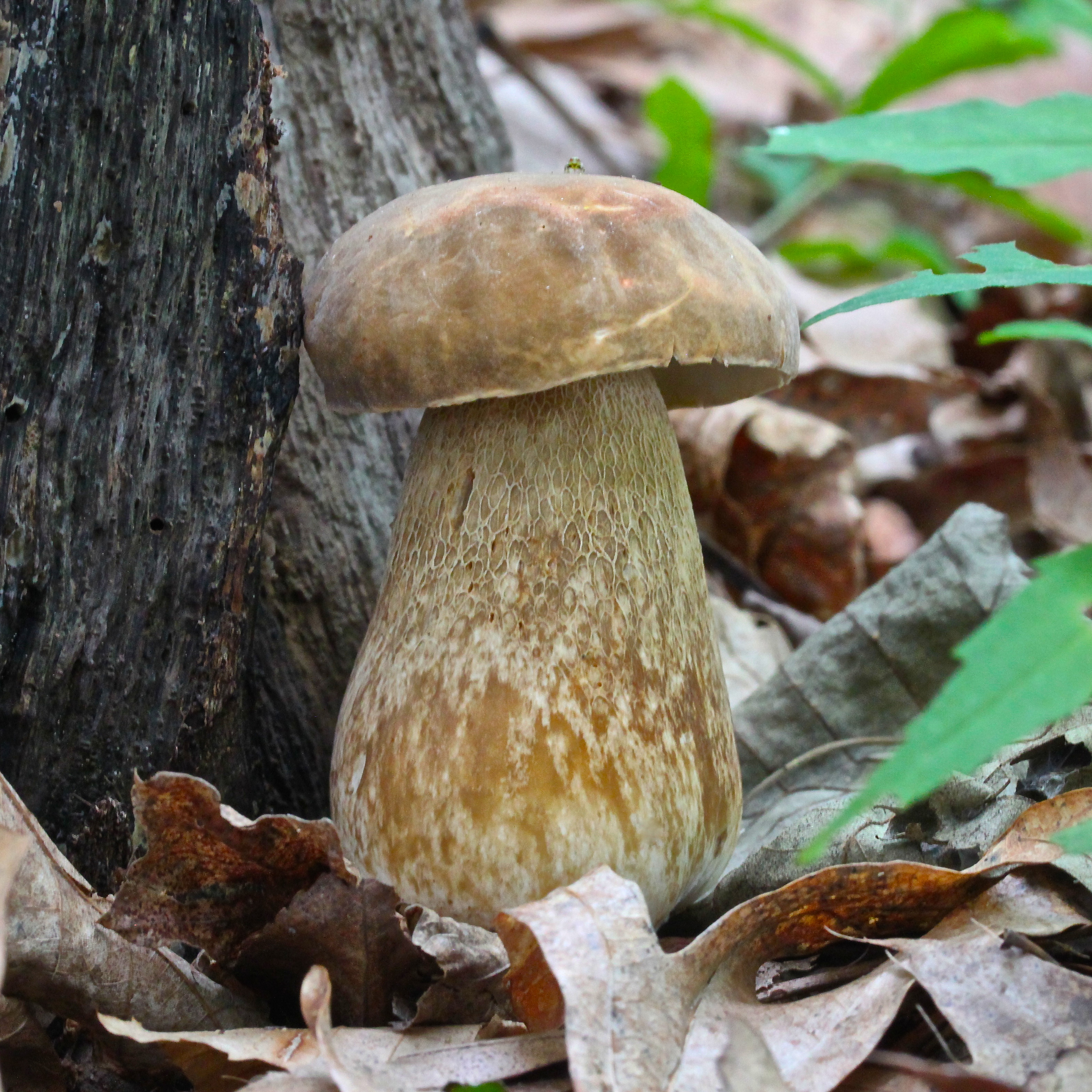

Scientific classification
- Kingdom: Fungi
- Division: Basidiomycota
- Class: Agaricomycetes
- Order: Boletales
- Family: Boletaceae
- Genus: Boletus
- Species: B. variipes

Binomial name
- Boletus variipes Peck (1888)

= Boletus variipes =

Species of fungus

Boletus variipes is a species of bolete fungus in the family Boletaceae. It is native to North America and mycorrhizal with hardwoods. It is an edible mushroom.

== Taxonomy ==
The species was first described by American mycologist Charles Horton Peck in 1888, with Boletus variipes var. fagicola described by Smith and Thiers in 1971.

A 2010 paper analyzing the genetic relationships within Boletus found that what was classified at the time as B. variipes was not monophyletic. Populations from east of the Rocky Mountains were sister to B. hiratsukae of Japan, with those from Central America and southeastern North America were sister to that combined lineage. This required the latter group to be renamed. A third population, from the Philippines, has been known as B. variipes although was more distantly related.

== Description ==
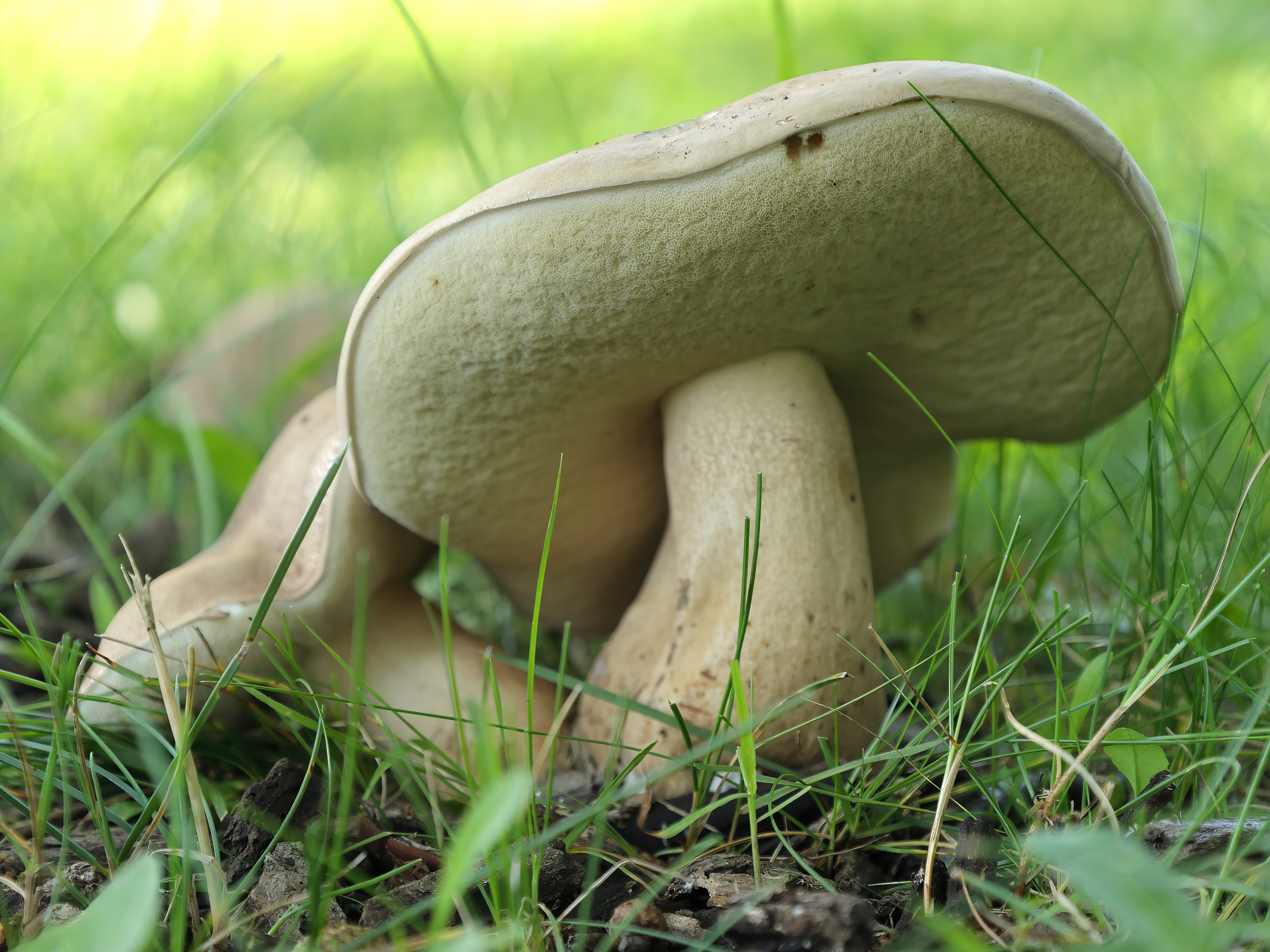
Detail of the pore surface

Boletus variipes has a dry tan or brown-gray cap, which is broad, convex to almost flat, between 6 and 20 centimetres (2 1/2 and 8 inches) wide, with a tendency to become cracked or finely patched in maturity. The pore surface below is white when young (when the pores appear "stuffed"), yellowing to olive as the spores mature, with a density of 1 to 2 pores per millimetre. The stipe is whitish to brown, frequently reticulated, between 8 and 15 cm (3 and 6 in) long and 1 to 3.5 cm (1/2 to 1 1/2 in) thick, equal or wider in the middle or towards the base.

The flesh does not discolor when cut or bruised. The spore print is olive brown.

=== Similar species ===
Boletus variipes is closely related to Boletus edulis.

== Distribution and habitat ==
Boletus variipes is common throughout eastern North America and has been documented in Costa Rica. It is mycorrhizal with hardwoods, particularly oaks.

== Uses ==
While its odor and taste are mild, the species is a choice edible mushroom.

== See also ==
- List of Boletus species
- List of North American boletes
