= Aurel Dermek =

- Born: 25 July 1925; Brodské, Slovakia
- Died: April 15, 1989 (aged 63); Bratislava, Slovakia
- Occupations: Mycologist, writer
- Writing career
- Language: Slovak
- Genre: Field guides
- Subject: Mushrooms of Czechoslovakia
- Notable work: Hríbovité huby (Fungi of the Boletaceae Family)

Aurel Dermek (born 25 July 1925, died 15 April 1989) was a Slovak mycologist, writer, photographer and illustrator.

== Biography ==
Dermek spent his childhood in Brodské, and later attended high school in the nearby Malacky. After abandoning the pursuit of a technical college degree, Dermek worked as an industrial designer in and around Bratislava. A self-taught mycologist, his interest in the field grew from a hobby into a secondary profession. Throughout his career, which spanned 24 years, he published over 50 scientific papers and 16 books, translated into multiple foreign languages. In addition to the above, he dedicated his time to producing visual images of fungi: altogether he published 869 watercolor plates, usually containing multiple species per plate and multiple fruiting bodies per species, as well as 759 color photographs and 432 pieces of line art. After retiring in 1985, he spent the rest of his days in Brodské.

He was an honorary member of the Czechoslovak Scientific Society for Mycology and the Czech Mycological Society, as well as an accomplished member of the Slovak Botanical Society at the Slovak Academy of Sciences.

The standard author abbreviation Dermek is used to indicate this person as the author when citing a botanical name.

== New taxa ==
On his own and/or in cooperation with colleagues, especially with Albert Pilát, Aurel Dermek reclassified 17 fungal taxa (including the creation of Rubinoboletus as a genus and Boletus erythropus discolor as a subspecies), as well as described and published the following new taxa:

=== Species ===
- 1973: Boletus pinophilus Pilát & Dermek
- 1974: Leccinum piceinum Pilát & Dermek
- 1974: Leccinum subcinnamomeum Pilát & Dermek
- 1974: Leccinum thalassinum Pilát & Dermek
- 1979: Boletus subappendiculatus Dermek, Lazebn. & J. Veselský
- 1981: Leccinum crocistipidosum H. Engel & Dermek

=== Varieties ===
- 1973: Boletus pinophilus var. pinophilus Pilát & Dermek
- 1973: Xerocomus chrysenteron var. robustus Dermek
- 1983: Boletus edulis var. arenarius H. Engel, Krieglst. & Dermek
- 1984: Boletus erythropus var. rubropileus Dermek
- 1985: Macrolepiota mastoidea var. atrobrunnea Dermek

=== Forms ===
- 1973: Boletus pinophilus f. pinophilus Pilát & Dermek

== Publications ==
- 1967: Aurel Dermek: Naše huby (Our Fungi)
- 1974: Aurel Dermek, Albert Pilát: Hríbovité huby (Fungi of the Boletaceae Family)
- 1974: Aurel Dermek, Albert Pilát: Poznávajme huby (Getting to Know Fungi)
- 1976: Aurel Dermek: Huby lesov, poli a lúk (Fungi of Forests, Fields and Meadows)
- 1977: Aurel Dermek: Atlas našich húb (Field Guide of our Mushrooms)
- 1980: Aurel Dermek, Pavel Lizoň: Malý atlas húb (Small Field Guide of Mushrooms)
