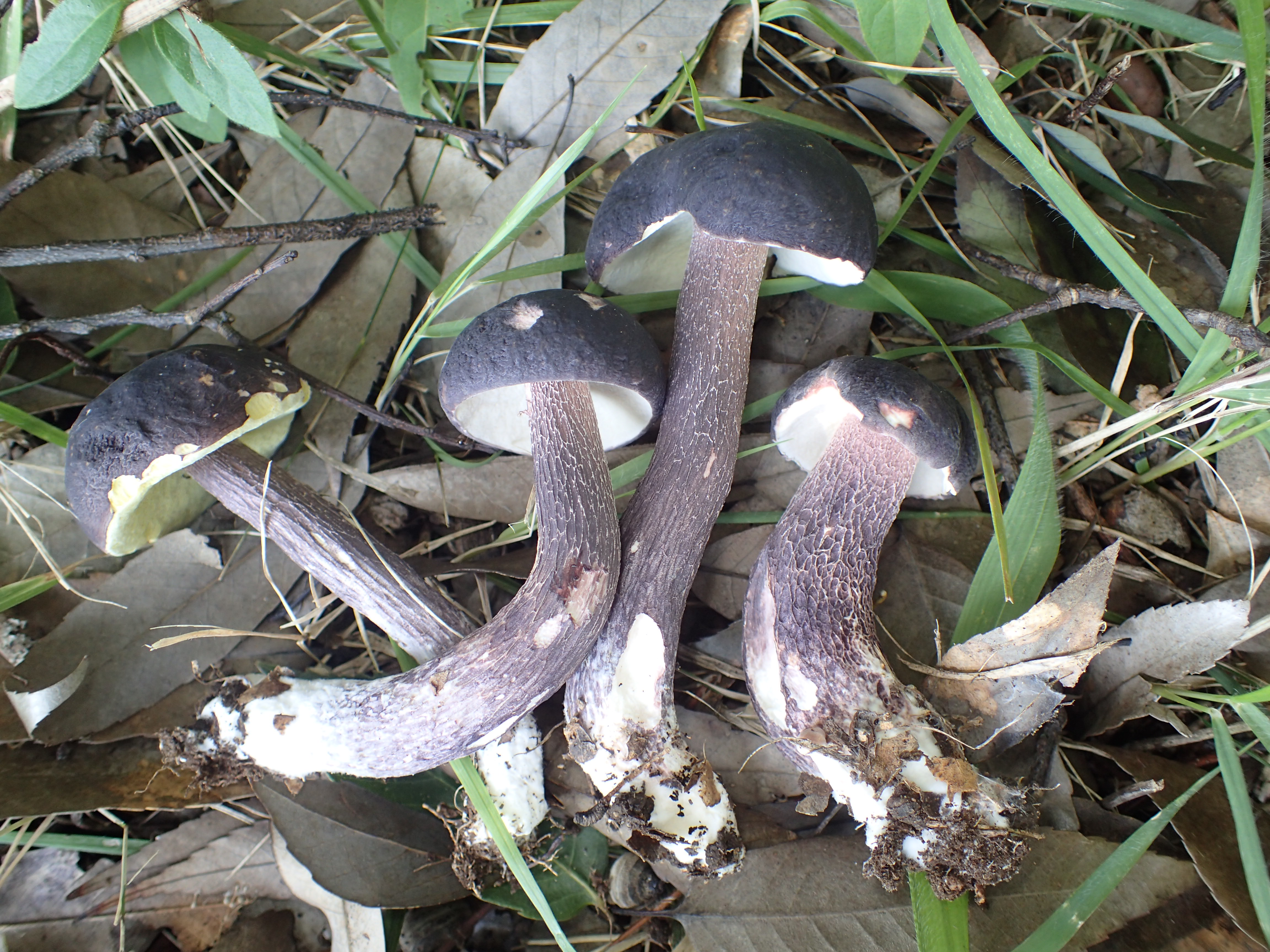

Scientific classification
- Domain: Eukaryota
- Kingdom: Fungi
- Division: Basidiomycota
- Class: Agaricomycetes
- Order: Boletales
- Family: Boletaceae
- Genus: Boletus
- Species: B. violaceofuscus

Binomial name
- Boletus violaceofuscus W.F. Chiu (1948)

= Boletus violaceofuscus =

Species of fungus

Boletus violaceofuscus is a fungus of the genus Boletus native to China. First Described by W.F Chiu in 1948. It is related to Boletus separans.

== Description ==
The cap has a diameter of 4-7 cm, hemispherical when young, broad to almost flat when mature. Colored dark blue, "Blue Violet," and sometimes ageing to "Maroon Purple," the top is usually smooth, rarely wrinkled or with corrugations with a faintly velvety texture. Pore tubes on the underside are 3-6mm long and 0.5 to 1mm wide, white when young a pale yellowish when mature or bruised.

The stipe is 5-7cm long and 1-2 cm thick, not strongly attached to the cap with a narrow top tending toward the thick middle shape typical of Boletus. The stipe is somewhat the same color as the cap, but paler with distinct white mesh veins. The flesh is solid, white and tending to become spongy when old, prone to infestation with larvae.

The spores appear green-gray or olive under the microscope, with a tapered elliptical shape of 12-14um x 5-6um size.

== See also ==
- List of Boletus species
