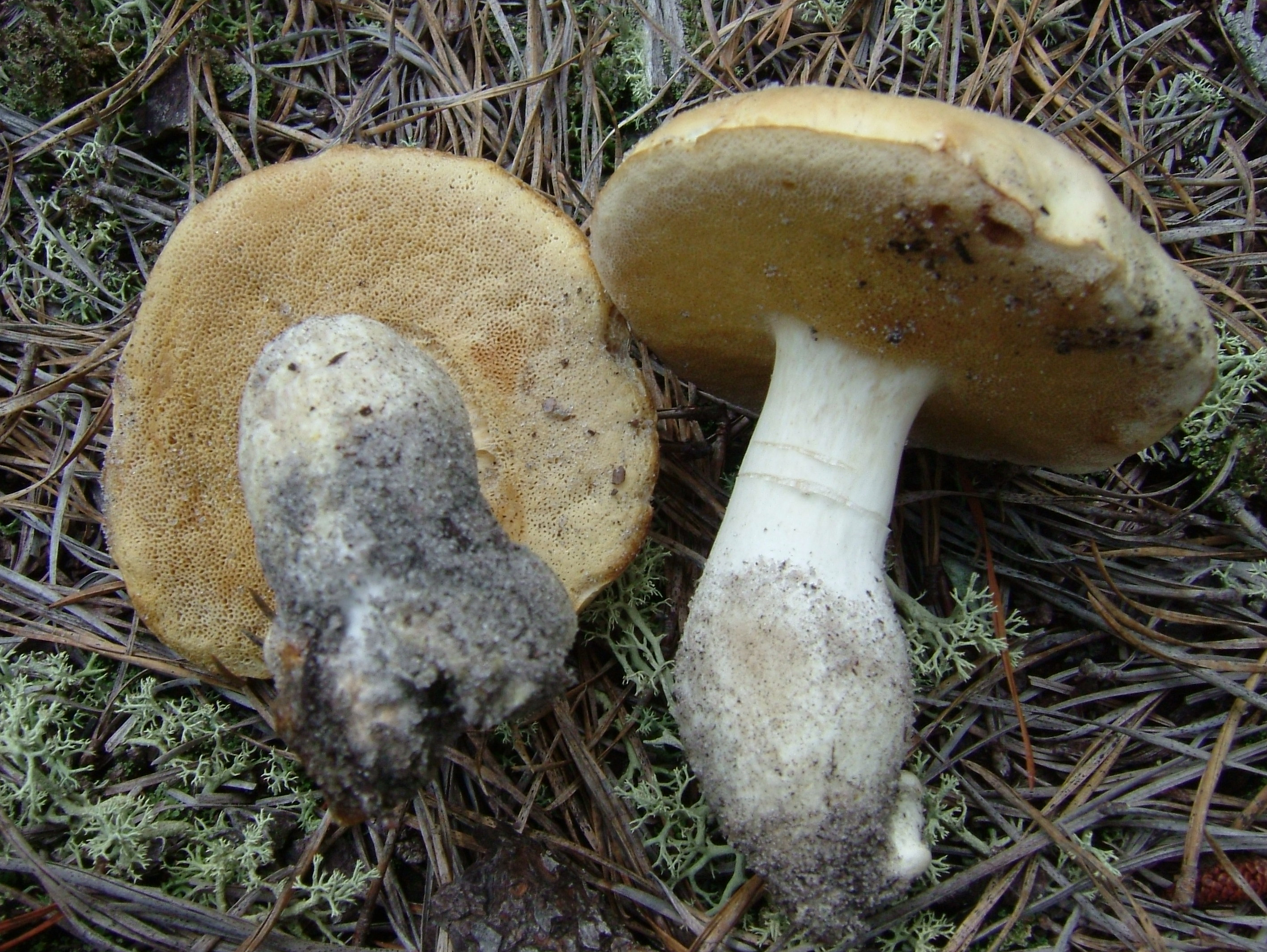

Scientific classification
- Domain: Eukaryota
- Kingdom: Fungi
- Division: Basidiomycota
- Class: Agaricomycetes
- Order: Boletales
- Family: Boletaceae
- Genus: Xanthoconium
- Species: X. stramineum

Binomial name
- Xanthoconium stramineum (Murrill) Singer (1944)

Synonyms
- Gyroporus stramineus Murrill (1940); Boletus stramineus (Murrill) Murrill (1940); Leucogyroporus stramineus (Murrill) Snell (1942)

= Xanthoconium stramineum =

Species of fungus

Xanthoconium stramineum is a species of bolete fungus and the type species of the genus Xanthoconium. First described as a species of Gyroporus by William Alphonso Murrill in 1940, it was placed in its current genus by Rolf Singer in 1944.

== See also ==
- List of North American boletes
