= Boletus viscidiceps =

Scientific classification
- Domain: Eukaryota
- Kingdom: Fungi
- Division: Basidiomycota
- Class: Agaricomycetes
- Order: Boletales
- Family: Boletaceae
- Genus: Boletus
- Species: B. viscidiceps

Binomial name
- Boletus viscidiceps B. Feng, Yang Y. Cui, J. P. Xu & Zhu L. Yang

Species of fungus

Boletus viscidiceps is a species of porcini-like fungus native to Yunnan Province in southwestern China.
