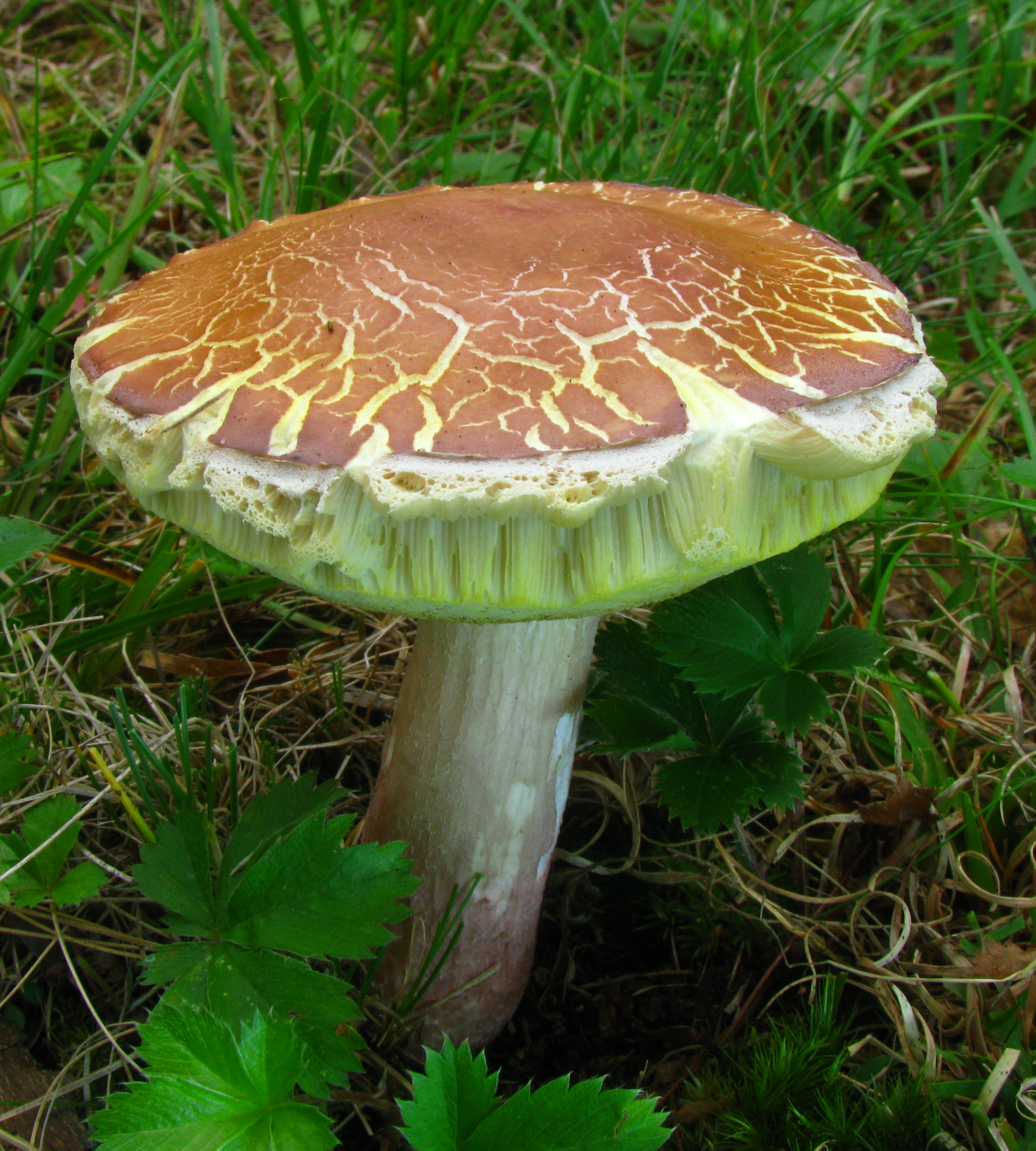

Scientific classification
- Domain: Eukaryota
- Kingdom: Fungi
- Division: Basidiomycota
- Class: Agaricomycetes
- Order: Boletales
- Family: Boletaceae
- Genus: Boletus
- Species: B. separans

Binomial name
- Boletus separans Peck (1873)

Synonyms
- Boletus edulis subsp. separans (Peck) Singer (1947); Boletus edulis f. separans (Peck) Vassilkov (1966); Boletus reticulatus subsp. separans (Peck) Hlaváček (1994); Xanthoconium separans (Peck) Halling & Both (1998)

= Boletus separans =

Species of fungus

Boletus separans is a species of bolete fungus in the family Boletaceae.

== Taxonomy ==
The species was described as new to science in 1873 by American mycologist Charles Horton Peck. In 1998, Roy Halling and Ernst Both transferred the bolete to the genus Xanthoconium. Molecular phylogenetic analysis published in 2013 shows that it is more closely related to Boletus sensu stricto than to Xanthoconium.

== Description ==
The brownish cap is 4–12 centimetres (1 1/2–4 3/4 in) wide with dented pits. There are 1–3 pores per millimetre, white when young, aging to yellow. The stem is 4–12 cm tall and 1.5–3 cm (1/2–1 1/4 in) thick. The flesh is white, with a mild scent and taste; the smell is unpleasant when dried. The spore print is brownish.

It resembles Xanthoconium purpureum and Tylopilus rubrobrunneus.

== Habitat and distribution ==
It grows on the ground in the eastern United States from June to September.

== Uses ==
The species is a choice edible mushroom.

== See also ==
- List of Boletus species
- List of North American boletes
