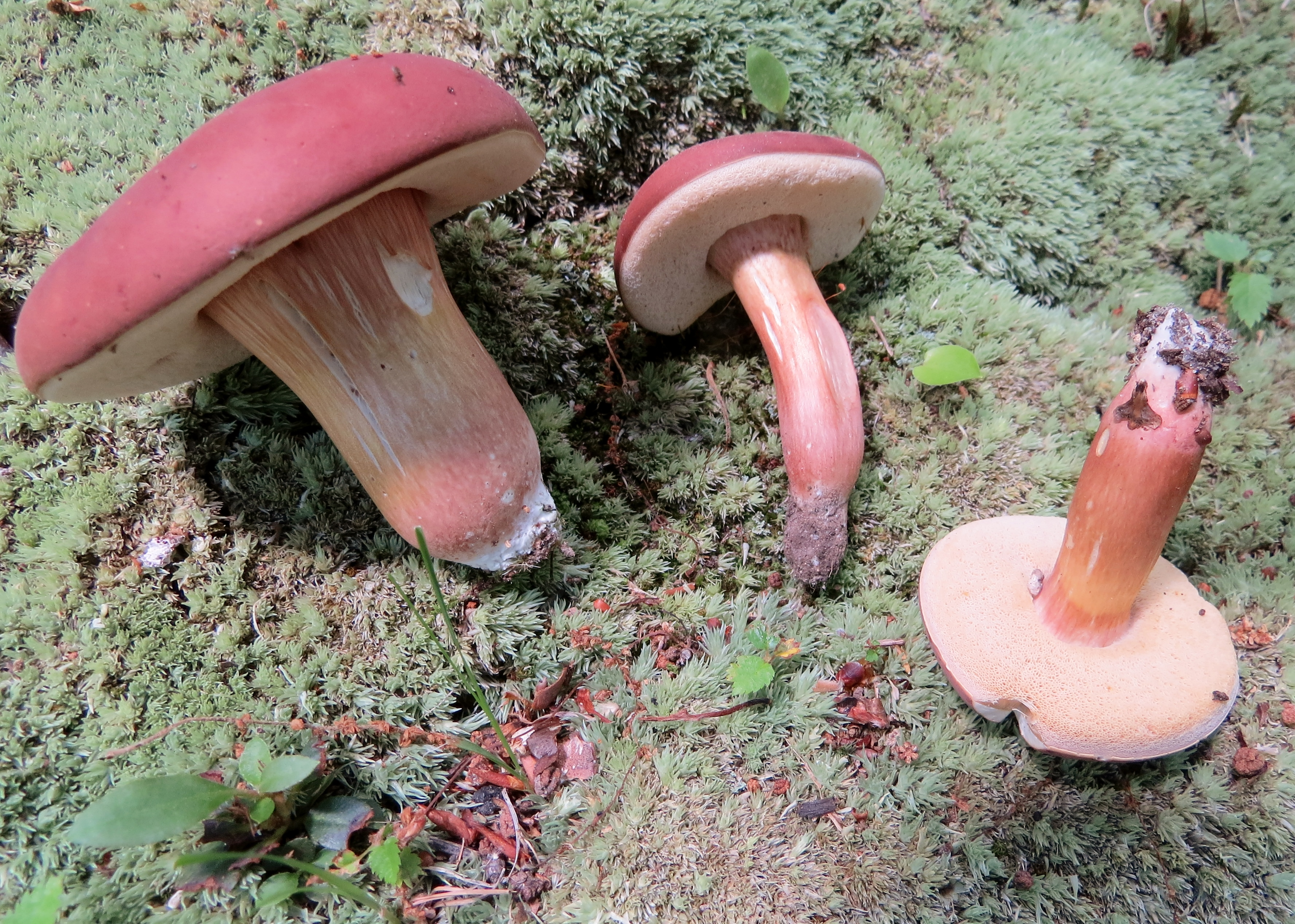

Scientific classification
- Kingdom: Fungi
- Division: Basidiomycota
- Class: Agaricomycetes
- Order: Boletales
- Family: Boletaceae
- Genus: Xanthoconium
- Species: X. purpureum

Binomial name
- Xanthoconium purpureum Snell & E.A.Dick (1962)

Synonyms
- Boletus purpureofuscus H.V.Sm. & A.H.Sm. (1973)

= Xanthoconium purpureum =

Species of fungus

Xanthoconium purpureum is a species of bolete fungus in the genus Xanthoconium. It was described as new to science in 1962 by Wally Snell and Esther Dick in 1962. It is found in eastern North America, where it fruits under oak, sometimes in oak-pine forests.

== See also ==
- List of North American boletes
