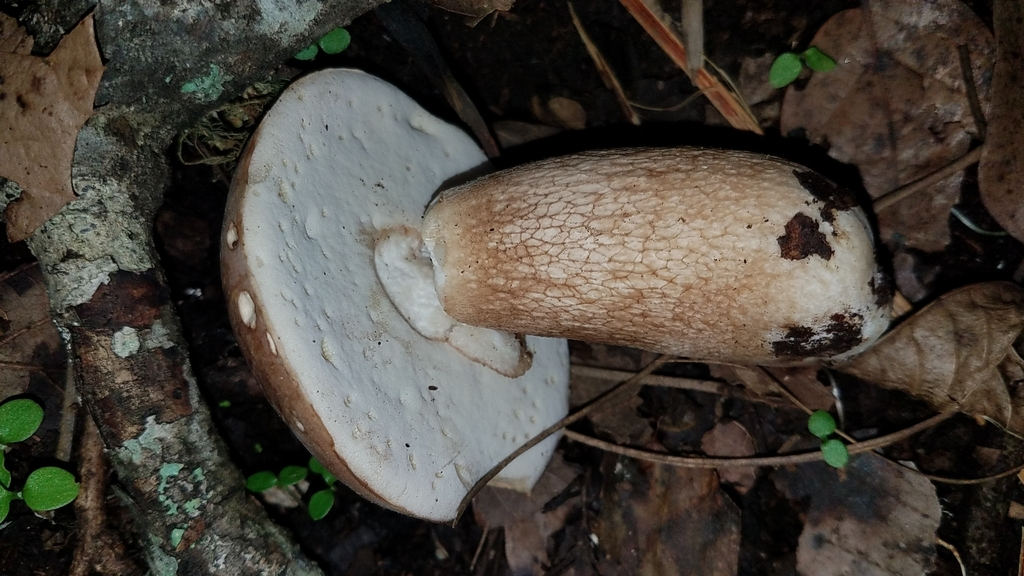

Scientific classification
- Domain: Eukaryota
- Kingdom: Fungi
- Division: Basidiomycota
- Class: Agaricomycetes
- Order: Boletales
- Family: Boletaceae
- Genus: Boletus
- Species: B. quercophilus

Binomial name
- Boletus quercophilus Halling & G.M. Mueller

= Boletus quercophilus =

Species of fungus

Boletus quercophilus is a species of porcini-like fungus native to Costa Rica, where it grows under Quercus copeyensis and Quercus seemannii.
