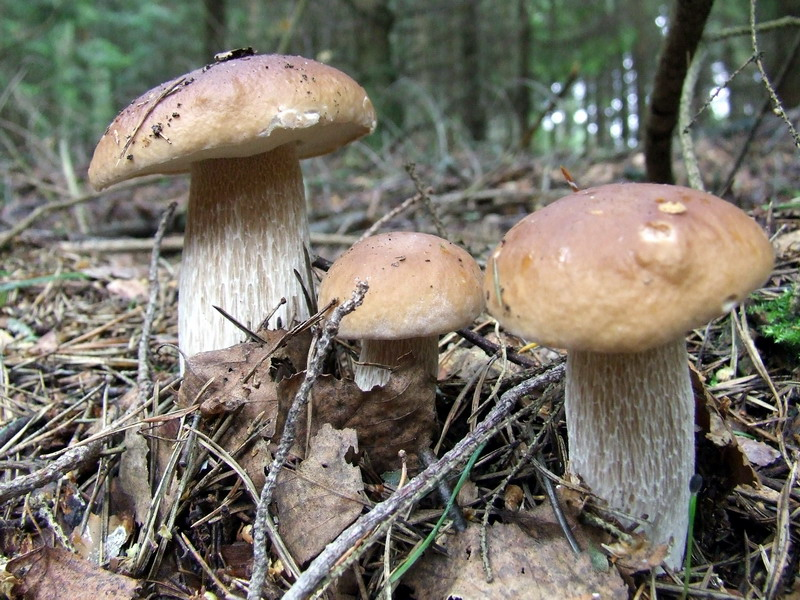
- Boletus edulis

Scientific classification
- Kingdom: Fungi
- Division: Basidiomycota
- Class: Agaricomycetes
- Order: Boletales
- Family: Boletaceae
- Genus: Boletus; L. (1753)

Type species
- Boletus edulis Bull. (1782)

Diversity
- over 300 species

Synonyms
- Suillus P.Micheli ex Adans. (1763); Tubiporus P.Karst. (1881); Suillus Haller ex Kuntze (1898); Oedipus Bataille (1908); Ceriomyces Murrill (1909); Xerocomopsis Reichert (1940); Notholepiota E.Horak (1971)

= Boletus =

Genus of fungus

Boletus
- Mycological characteristics
- Pores on hymenium
- Cap is convex or flat
- Hymenium is adnate
- Stipe is bare
- Ecology is mycorrhizal

Boletus is a genus of mushroom-producing fungi, comprising over 100 species. The name is derived from the Latin term bōlētus 'mushroom' from the Ancient Greek βωλίτης, bōlitēs, ultimately from βῶλος, bōlos 'lump' or 'clod'. However, the βωλίτης of Galen is thought to have been the much prized Amanita caesarea.

The genus Boletus was originally broadly defined and described by Carl Linnaeus in 1753, essentially containing all fungi with hymenial pores instead of gills. Since then, other genera have been defined gradually, such as Tylopilus by Petter Adolf Karsten in 1881, and old names such as Leccinum have been resurrected or redefined. Some mushrooms listed in older books as members of the genus have now been placed in separate genera. These include such as Boletus scaber, now Leccinum scabrum, Tylopilus felleus, Chalciporus piperatus and Suillus luteus. Most boletes have been found to be ectomycorrhizal fungi, which means that they form a mutualistic relationship with the roots system of certain kinds of plants. More recently, Boletus has been found to be massively polyphyletic, with only a small percentage of the over 300 species that have been assigned to Boletus actually belonging there and necessitating the description and resurrection of many more genera.

"Boletus" has historically been listed as food for several animals, such as the larvae of the pleasing fungus beetle Tritoma mimetica. However, old records often actually refer to species now placed into other genera of Boletaceae, and may not always be determinable today.

== Phylogenetic tree of Boletus ==
- - - - - - B. barrowsii Thiers & A.H.Sm. 1976
          - B. viscidiceps B.Feng, Y.Y.Cui, J.P.Xu & Zhu L.Yang 2015
        - - - B. aereus Bull. 1789
            - - B. bainiugan Dentinger 2013
              - B. meiweiniuganjun Dentinger 2013
              - B. reticulatus Schaeff. 1774
          - - B. shiyong Dentinger 2013
            - - B. nobilissimus Both & R.Riedel 2000
              - B. quercophilus Halling & G.M.Muell. 1999
      - - - B. umbrinipileus B.Feng, Y.Y.Cui, J.P.Xu & Zhu L.Yang 2015
          - B. monilifer B.Feng, Y.Y.Cui, J.P.Xu & Zhu L.Yang 2015
          - B. botryoides B.Feng, Y.Y.Cui, J.P.Xu & Zhu L.Yang 2015
        - - - - B. variipes Peck 1888
              - B. hiratsukae Nagas. 1994
            - B. variipes Peck 1888
          - - B. fagacicola B.Feng, Y.Y.Cui, J.P.Xu & Zhu L.Yang 2015
            - - B. sinoedulis B.Feng, Y.Y.Cui, J.P.Xu & Zhu L.Yang 2015
              - - B. reticuloceps (M.Zang, M.S.Yuan & M.Q.Gong 1993) Q.B.Wang & Y.J.Yao 2005
                - - B. edulis Bull. 1782
                  - B. rubriceps D.Arora & J.L.Frank 2014
                - - - B. rex-veris D.Arora & Simonini 2008
                    - B. fibrillosus Thiers 1975
                  - - B. pinophilus Pilát & Dermek 1973
                    - - B. subalpinus (Trappe & Thiers 1969) Nuhn, Manfr.Binder, A.F.S.Taylor, Halling & Hibbett 2013
                      - B. regineus D.Arora & Simonini 2008
                    - B. subcaerulescens (E.A.Dick & Snell 1965) Both, Bessette & A.R.Bessette 2000
    - B. austroedulis Halling & N.A.Fechner 2014
  - - - - - - - - B. tylopilopsis B.Feng, Y.Y.Cui, J.P.Xu & Zhu L.Yang 2015
                - B. nobilis Peck 1905
              - - B. violaceofuscus W.F.Chiu 1948
                - B. separans =Xanthoconium separans (Peck 1873) Halling & Both 1998
            - B. subviolaceofuscus B.Feng, Y.Y.Cui, J.P.Xu & Zhu L.Yang 2015
          - B. semigastroideus Nuhn, Manfr.Binder, A.F.S.Taylor, Halling & Hibbett 2013
        - B. orientialbus N.K.Zeng & Zhu L.Yang 2014
      - B. albobrunnescens Desjardin, Dentinger & D.Arora 2014
- B. pallidus= Imleria pallida (Frost 1873) A.Farid, A.R.Franck & J.Bolin 2020

== Edibility ==
The genus Boletus contains many members which are edible, such as Boletus edulis, Boletus aereus and Boletus barrowsii.

Boletes with red pores may be toxic.

== See also ==
- Bolete eater, a fungal parasite of various Boletus species
- List of Boletus species
