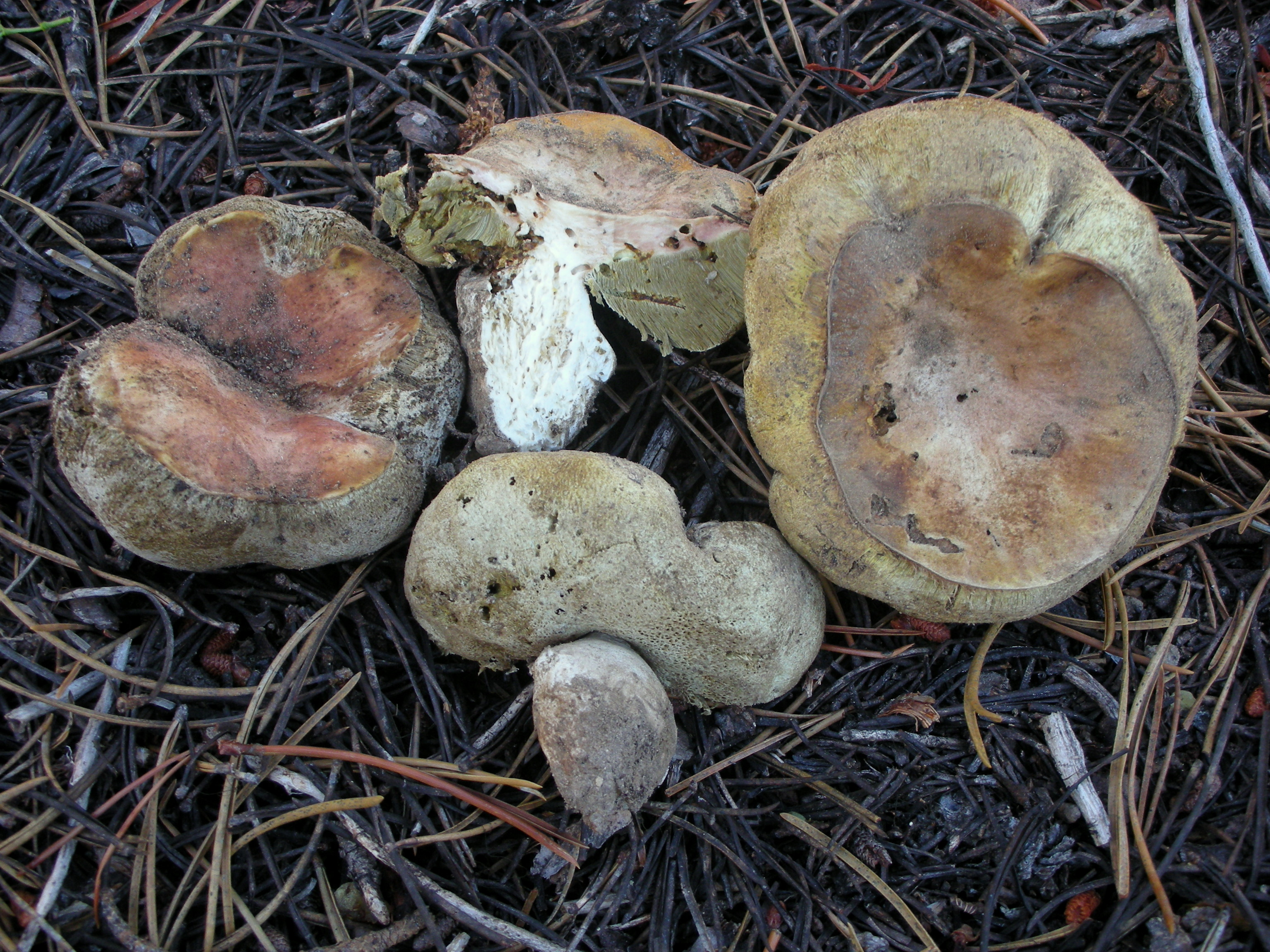

Scientific classification
- Kingdom: Fungi
- Division: Basidiomycota
- Class: Agaricomycetes
- Order: Boletales
- Family: Boletaceae
- Genus: Boletus
- Species: B. subalpinus

Binomial name
- Boletus subalpinus (Trappe & Thiers) M.Nuhn, Manfr.Binder, A.F.S.Taylor, Halling, & Hibbett (2013)

Synonyms
- Gastroboletus subalpinus Trappe & Thiers (1969)

= Boletus subalpinus =

Species of fungus

Boletus subalpinus
- Mycological characteristics
- Pores on hymenium
- Cap is convex or depressed
- Hymenium is adnexed
- Stipe is bare
- Spore print is yellow-brown
- Ecology is mycorrhizal
- Edibility is unknown

Boletus subalpinus, commonly known as the gasteroid king bolete, is a species of fungus in the family Boletaceae. The species was first described scientifically in 1969 by American mycologists Harry Delbert Thiers and James M. Trappe. It was originally named as a species of Gastroboletus but was found to be in Boletus sensu stricto in a 2013 molecular phylogenetics study.

The cap is 5–12 centimetres (2–4 3/4 in) wide, buff, convex and then flattening. The flesh is whitish, staining bluish or sometimes pink. The pores are pale then darken and produce no spore print. The stalk is up to 6 cm long and 5 cm thick, pale and darkening with age, sometimes darker at the base.

The species is found in California and Oregon.

== See also ==
- List of Boletus species
- List of North American boletes
