= Boletus shiyong =

Scientific classification
- Domain: Eukaryota
- Kingdom: Fungi
- Division: Basidiomycota
- Class: Agaricomycetes
- Order: Boletales
- Family: Boletaceae
- Genus: Boletus
- Species: B. shiyong

Binomial name
- Boletus shiyong Dentinger 2013

Species of fungus

Boletus shiyong is a species of porcini-like fungus native to Yunnan Province in Southwestern China, where it grows under Picea spp., Pinus densata, and Quercus aquifolioides. It is very closely related to Boletus quercophilus and Boletus nobilissimus; less closely to Boletus aereus.

The epithet shiyong is the Hanyu Pinyin transcription of the fungus's Mandarin epithet, 食用 "edible", originally used to translate the epithet of Boletus edulis.
