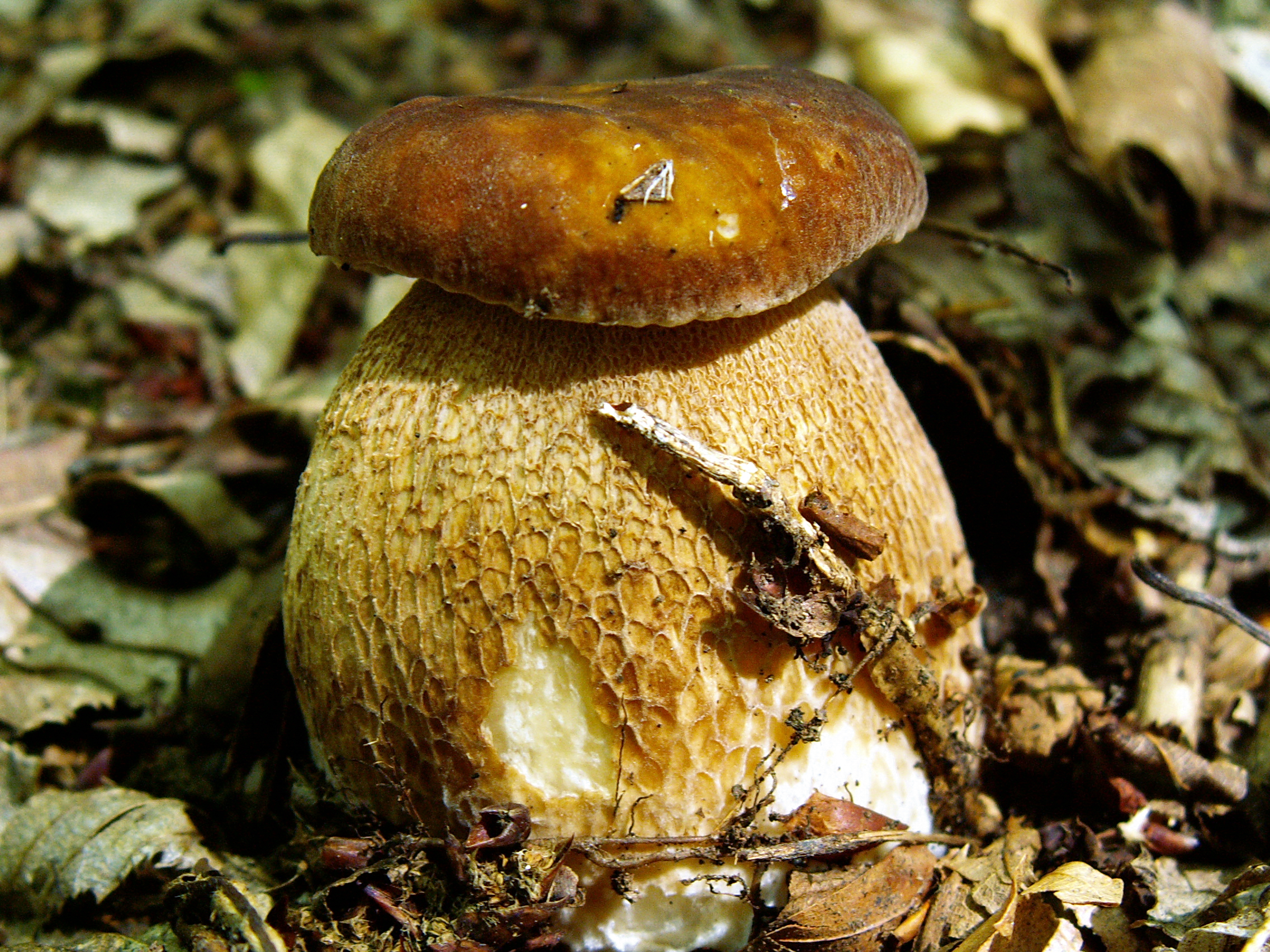

Scientific classification
- Kingdom: Fungi
- Division: Basidiomycota
- Class: Agaricomycetes
- Order: Boletales
- Family: Boletaceae
- Genus: Boletus
- Species: B. reticulatus

Binomial name
- Boletus reticulatus Schaeff. (1774)

Synonyms
- Tubiporus aestivalis Paulet (1793); Boletus aestivalis (Paulet) Fr. (1838)

= Boletus reticulatus =

Species of fungus

Boletus reticulatus
- Mycological characteristics
- Pores on hymenium
- Cap is convex
- Hymenium is adnate
- Stipe is bare
- Spore print is olive
- Ecology is mycorrhizal
- Edibility is choice

Boletus reticulatus (alternately known as Boletus aestivalis (Paulet) Fr.), and commonly referred to as the summer cep is a basidiomycete fungus of the genus Boletus. It occurs in deciduous forests of Europe, where it forms a symbiotic mycorrhizal relationship with species of oak (Quercus). The fungus produces fruiting bodies in the summer months which are edible and popularly collected. The summer cep was formally described by Jacob Christian Schäffer as Boletus reticulatus in 1774, which took precedence over B. aestivalis as described by Jean-Jacques Paulet in 1793.

== Taxonomy ==
German naturalist Jacob Christian Schäffer described the summer cep as Boletus reticulatus in 1774, in his series on fungi of Bavaria and the Palatinate, Fungorum qui in Bavaria et Palatinatu circa Ratisbonam nascuntur icones. French mycologist Jean-Jacques Paulet described it as Le grand Mousseux (Tubiporus aestivalis) in 1793, adding that it was delicious with chicken fricassee and could be found in the Bois de Boulogne in summer. the species name the species name is derived from the Latin aestas "summer". Swedish mycologist Elias Magnus Fries followed Paulet, using Boletus aestivalis in 1838.

The two names have been used in literature for many years.

Boletus reticulatus is classified in Boletus section Boletus, alongside close relatives such as B. aereus, B. edulis, and B. pinophilus. A genetic study of the four European species found that B. reticulatus was sister to B. aereus. More extensive testing of worldwide taxa revealed that B. reticulatus was most closely related to two lineages that had been classified as B. edulis from southern China and Korea/northern China respectively. The common ancestor of these three species was related to a lineage consisting of B. aereus and the genetically close B. mamorensis. Molecular analysis suggests that the B. aereus/mamorensis and B. reticulatus/Chinese B. "edulis" lineages diverged around 6 to 7 million years ago.

The British Mycological Society approved the name "summer bolete" for Boletus reticulatus.

== Description ==
The summer cep's fruiting body is a mushroom with a swollen bulbous stem, and large convex cap. The cap is more or less round and usually up to 30 centimetres (12 in) in diameter. It bears a velvety brown, rust to chocolate cuticle which when dry often cracks to reveal the white flesh underneath, giving the appearance of a net.

The darker, more uniform shade and the velvety feel of the cap are a key feature distinguishing this species as is the vagueness or total absence of a white edge to the cap margin as seen in Boletus edulis. The tubes and pores of the hymenium are initially white, darkening with age to pale yellow and finally brown. The stipe is central, up to about 12 cm (4 3/4 in) tall, and has a strongly marked reticulated pattern with a variable white to brown colour.

The flesh is white and thick and remains firm if yellowish as the mushroom ages, and is often attacked by insect larvae. Its odour is pleasant.

== Distribution and habitat ==
The summer cep is found in woods throughout Europe, after hot and humid weather, from the start of summer until the end of autumn. It is particularly common in the south and west of France, as well as in Tosco-Emiliano Apennine in Italy. It is less host-specific than other porcini mushrooms. It occurs in Ukraine and Crimea, and Republic of Karelia, Karachay-Cherkessia, Krasnodar Krai, Tula Oblast, Moscow Oblast, and as far east as Primorsky Krai in Russia. Boletus reticulatus has been recovered from southern Africa, where it was likely introduced, growing under the Mexican species Pinus patula.

== Edibility ==
The summer cep, like most ceps, is edible and useful in cooking. However, its flesh is somewhat less firm than other ceps. Based on analysis of fruit bodies collected in Portugal, there are 334 kilocalories per 100 gram of bolete (as dry weight). The macronutrient composition of 100 grams of dried bolete includes 22.6 grams of protein, 55.1 grams of carbohydrates, and 2.6 grams of fat. By weight, fresh fruit bodies are about 91% water. B. reticulatus contains predominantly unsaturated fatty acids; mainly cis-linoleic acid, followed by cis-oleic, palmitic, and stearic acids. The carbohydrate component contains the monosaccharides glucose, mannitol and α,α-trehalose, the polysaccharide glycogen, and the water-insoluble structural polysaccharide chitin, which accounts for up to 80–90% of dry matter in mushroom cell walls. Chitin, hemicellulose, and pectin-like carbohydrates—all indigestible by humans—contribute to high proportion of insoluble fibre in B. reticulatus. It also contains more tocopherol than other species of mushroom.

== See also ==
- List of Boletus species
- List of North American boletes

== Notes ==
- Media related to Boletus reticulatus at Wikimedia Commons
- This article contains translations from the French Wikipedia article.
