= Boletus bainiugan =

Scientific classification
- Domain: Eukaryota
- Kingdom: Fungi
- Division: Basidiomycota
- Class: Agaricomycetes
- Order: Boletales
- Family: Boletaceae
- Genus: Boletus
- Species: B. bainiugan

Binomial name
- Boletus bainiugan Dentinger 2013

Synonyms
- B. meiweiniuganjun Dentinger

Species of fungus

Boletus bainiugan is a species of porcini-like fungus native to Henan, Sichuan and Yunnan Provinces in Central and Southwestern China, where it grows under Pinus yunnanensis, Pinus kesiya and Castanea mollissima. It is closely related to Boletus reticulatus.

The epithet bainiugan is the Hanyu Pinyin transcription of the fungus's Mandarin name, 白牛肝 "white porcini". The other epithet meiweiniuganjun likewise is a transcription of 美味牛肝菌 "delicious porcini", a name originally used to translate the epithet of Boletus edulis.
