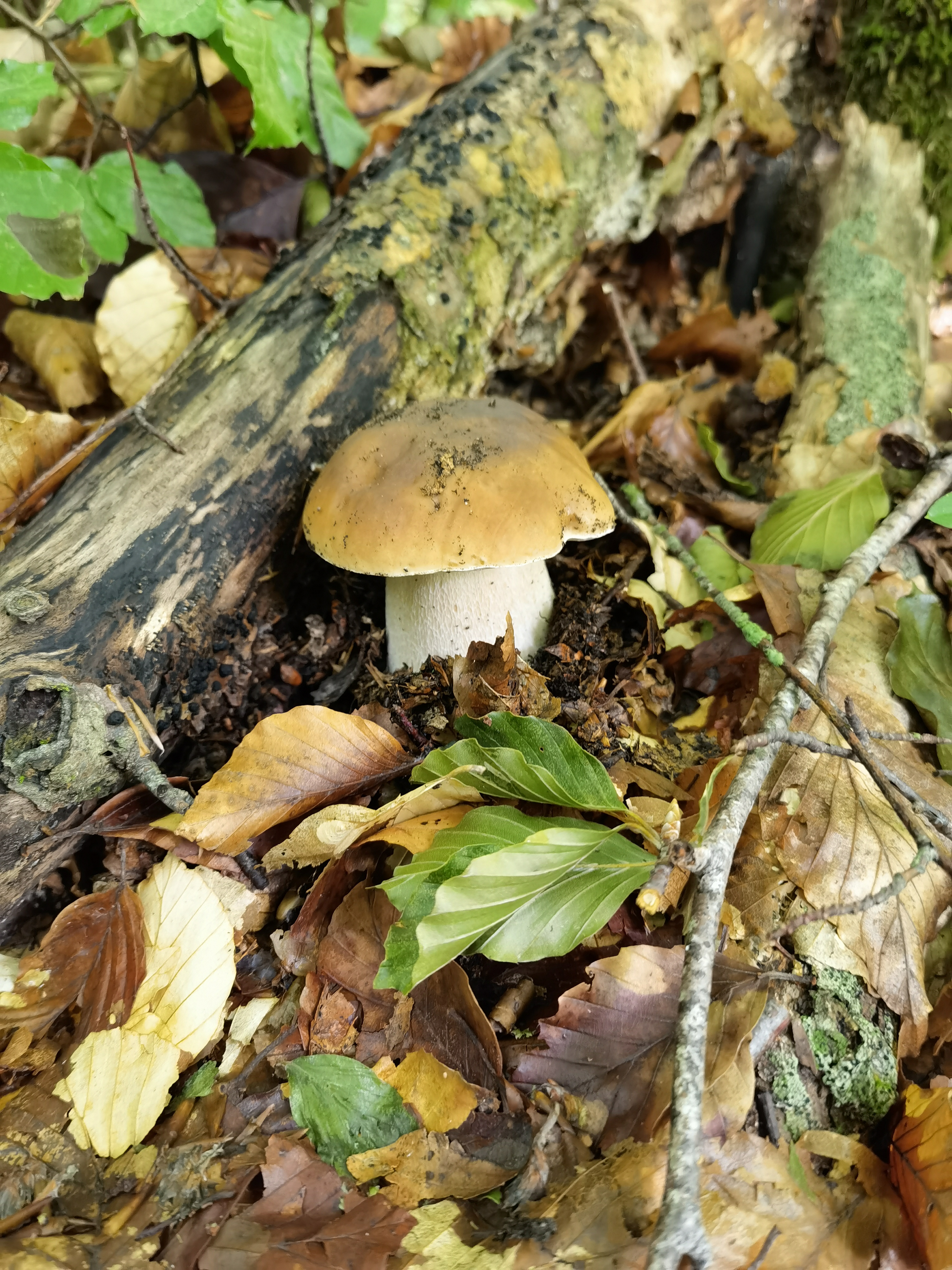
- In the northern Apennine Mountains, Abetina Reale forest, Italy

Conservation status
- Least Concern (IUCN 3.1)

Scientific classification
- Kingdom: Fungi
- Division: Basidiomycota
- Class: Agaricomycetes
- Order: Boletales
- Family: Boletaceae
- Genus: Boletus
- Species: B. edulis

Binomial name
- Boletus edulis Bull. (1782)

Synonyms
- Ceriomyces crassus Battarra (1775); Boletus solidus Sowerby (1809); Leccinum edule (Bull.) Gray (1821); Dictyopus edulis (Bull.) Forq. (1890)

= Boletus edulis =

Species of mushroom, widely distributed in the Northern Hemisphere

Boletus edulis
- Mycological characteristics
- Pores on hymenium
- Cap is convex
- Hymenium is adnate
- Stipe is bare
- Spore print is brown
- Ecology is mycorrhizal
- Edibility is choice

Boletus edulis (English: cep, penny bun, porcino) is a basidiomycete fungus, and the type species of the genus Boletus. It is prized as an edible mushroom.

The fungus produces spore-bearing fruit bodies above ground in summer and autumn. The fruit body has a large brown cap which can reach 30 cm (12 in) in diameter and 3 kg (6 lb 10 oz) in weight. Like other boletes, it has tubes extending downward from the underside of the cap, rather than gills; spores escape at maturity through the tube openings (pores). The pore surface of the fruit body is whitish when young, aging to a greenish-yellow. The stout stipe (or stem) is white or yellowish, up to 25 cm (10 in) tall and 7 cm (3 in) thick, and partially covered with a raised network pattern (reticulations).

The fungus grows in deciduous and coniferous forests and tree plantations, forming symbiotic ectomycorrhizal associations with living trees by enveloping the tree's underground roots with sheaths of fungal tissue. Widely distributed in the Northern Hemisphere across Eurasia and North America, it does not occur naturally in the Southern Hemisphere but has been introduced to it. Several closely related European mushrooms formerly thought to be varieties or forms of B. edulis have been shown using molecular phylogenetic analysis to be distinct species, while others previously classified as separate species are conspecific with B. edulis. The western North American species commonly known as the California king bolete (B. edulis var. grandedulis) is a large, darker-coloured variant first formally identified in 2007.

B. edulis is held in high regard in many cuisines and is commonly prepared and eaten in soups, pasta, or risotto. The mushroom is low in fat and digestible carbohydrates, while being high in protein, vitamins, minerals and dietary fibre. Although it is sold commercially, it is very difficult to cultivate. Available fresh in autumn throughout Europe and Russia, it is most often dried, packaged, and distributed worldwide. It keeps its flavour after drying and is then reconstituted and used in cooking. B. edulis is also one of the few fungi sold pickled.

== Taxonomy ==
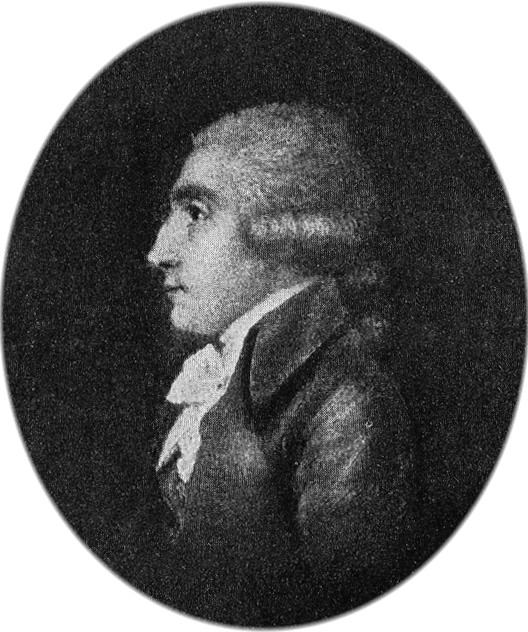
Pierre Bulliard described B. edulis in 1782.

Boletus edulis was first described in 1782 by the French botanist Pierre Bulliard and still bears its original name. The starting date of fungal taxonomy had been set as January 1, 1821, to coincide with the date of the works of the 'father of mycology', Swedish naturalist Elias Magnus Fries, which meant the name required sanction by Fries (indicated in the name by a colon) to be considered valid, as Bulliard's work preceded this date. It was thus written Boletus edulis Bull.:Fr. A 1987 revision of the International Code of Botanical Nomenclature set the starting date at May 1, 1753, the date of publication of Carl Linnaeus' Species Plantarum. Hence, the name no longer requires the ratification of Fries' authority. Early alternate names include Boletus solidus by English naturalist James Sowerby in 1809, and Gray's Leccinum edule. Gray's transfer of the species to Leccinum was later determined to be inconsistent with the rules of botanical nomenclature, and he apparently was unfamiliar with the earlier works of Fries when he published his arrangement of bolete species.

Boletus edulis is the type species of the genus Boletus. In Rolf Singer's classification of the Agaricales mushrooms, it is also the type species of section Boletus, a grouping of about 30 related boletes united by several characteristics: a mild-tasting, white flesh that does not change colour when exposed to air; a smooth to distinctly raised, netted pattern over at least the uppermost portion of the stem; a yellow-brown or olive-brown spore print; white tubes that later become yellowish then greenish, which initially appear to be stuffed with cotton; and cystidia that are not strongly coloured. Molecular analysis published in 1997 established that the bolete mushrooms are all derived from a common ancestor, and established the Boletales as an order separate from the Agaricales.

The generic name is derived from the Latin term bōlētus "mushroom", which was borrowed in turn from the Ancient Greek βωλίτης, "terrestrial fungus". Ultimately, this last word derives from bōlos/βῶλος "lump", "clod", and, metaphorically, "mushroom". The βωλίτης of Galen, like the boletus of Latin writers like Martial, Seneca and Petronius, is often identified as the much prized Amanita caesarea. The specific epithet edulis in Latin means "eatable" or "edible".

=== Common names ===
Common names for B. edulis vary by region. The standard Italian name, porcino (pl. porcini), means porcine; fungo porcino, in Italian, echoes the term suilli, literally "hog mushrooms", a term used by the Ancient Romans and still in use in southern Italian terms for this species. The derivation has been ascribed to the resemblance of young fruit bodies to piglets, or to the fondness pigs have for eating them. It is also known as "king bolete". The English penny bun refers to its rounded brownish shape.

The German name Steinpilz (stone mushroom) refers to the species' firm flesh. In Austria, it is called Herrenpilz, the "noble mushroom", while in Mexico, the Spanish name is panza, meaning "belly". Another Spanish name, rodellon, means "small round boulder", while the Dutch name eekhoorntjesbrood means "squirrel's bread". Russian names are belyy grib (ru:белый гриб; "white mushroom" as opposed to less valuable "black mushrooms") and borovik (ru:боровик; from bor—"pine forest"). The vernacular name cep is derived from the Catalan cep or its French name cèpe, although the latter is a generic term applying to several related species. In France, it is more fully cèpe de Bordeaux, derived from the Gascon cep "trunk" for its fat stalk, ultimately from the Latin cippus "stake". Ceppatello, ceppatello buono, ceppatello bianco, giallo leonato, ghezzo, and moreccio are names from Italian dialects, and ciurenys or surenys is another term in Catalan. The French-born King Charles XIV John popularised B. edulis in Sweden after 1818, and is honoured in the local vernacular name Karljohanssvamp, as well as the Danish name Karl Johan svamp. The monarch cultivated the fungus about his residence, Rosersberg Palace.

== Description ==
The cap of this mushroom grows up to 8–30 cm (3–12 in) wide, sometimes more. Viscid when moist, the cap is convex when young and flattens with age. The colour is generally reddish-brown, sometimes with a paler margin. The stipe grows up to 8–25 cm (3–10 in) tall and 2–7 cm (1–3 in) thick—rather large in comparison to the cap. The stem is usually enlarged at the base when young, becoming more cylindrical in age. It is finely reticulate on the upper portion or sometimes the whole. The flesh of the stem is sometimes dark yellow near the base.

The undersurface of the cap consists of thin tubes, the site of spore production; they are 1 to 2 cm (1/2 to 3/4 in) deep, and whitish in colour when young, but mature to a greenish-yellow. The angular pores, which do not stain when bruised, are small—roughly 2 to 3 pores per millimetre. In youth, the pores are white and appear as if stuffed with cotton (which are actually mycelia); as they age, they change colour to yellow and later to brown. The spore print is olive brown. The flesh of the fruit body is white, thick and firm when young, but becomes somewhat spongy with age. When bruised or cut, it either does not change colour, or turns a very light brown or light red. Mature specimens can weigh about 1 kg (2 lb 3 oz). A huge specimen collected on the Isle of Skye, Scotland, in 1995 weighed 3.2 kg (7 lb 1 oz); its cap was 42 cm (16 1/2 in) wide and the stipe was 18 cm (7 in) tall and 14 cm (5 1/2 in) wide. A similarly sized specimen found in Poland in 2013 made international news.

The spores are elliptical to spindle-shaped, with dimensions of 12–17 by 5–7 μm. The basidia, the spore-bearing cells, are produced in a layer lining the tubes, and arrange themselves so their ends are facing the center of the tube; this layer of cells is known technically as a hymenium. The basidia are thin-walled, mostly attached to four spores, and measure 25–30 by 8–10 μm. Another cell type present in the hymenium is the cystidia, larger sterile cells that protrude beyond the basidia into the lumen of the hymenium and act as air traps, regulating humidity. B. edulis has pleurocystidia (cystidia located on the face of a pore) that are thin-walled, roughly spindle-shaped to ventricose, and 30–45 by 7–10 μm; the "stuffed" feature of the hymenium is caused by cheilocystidia—cells found on the edges of the pores. The hyphae of B. edulis do not have clamp connections.

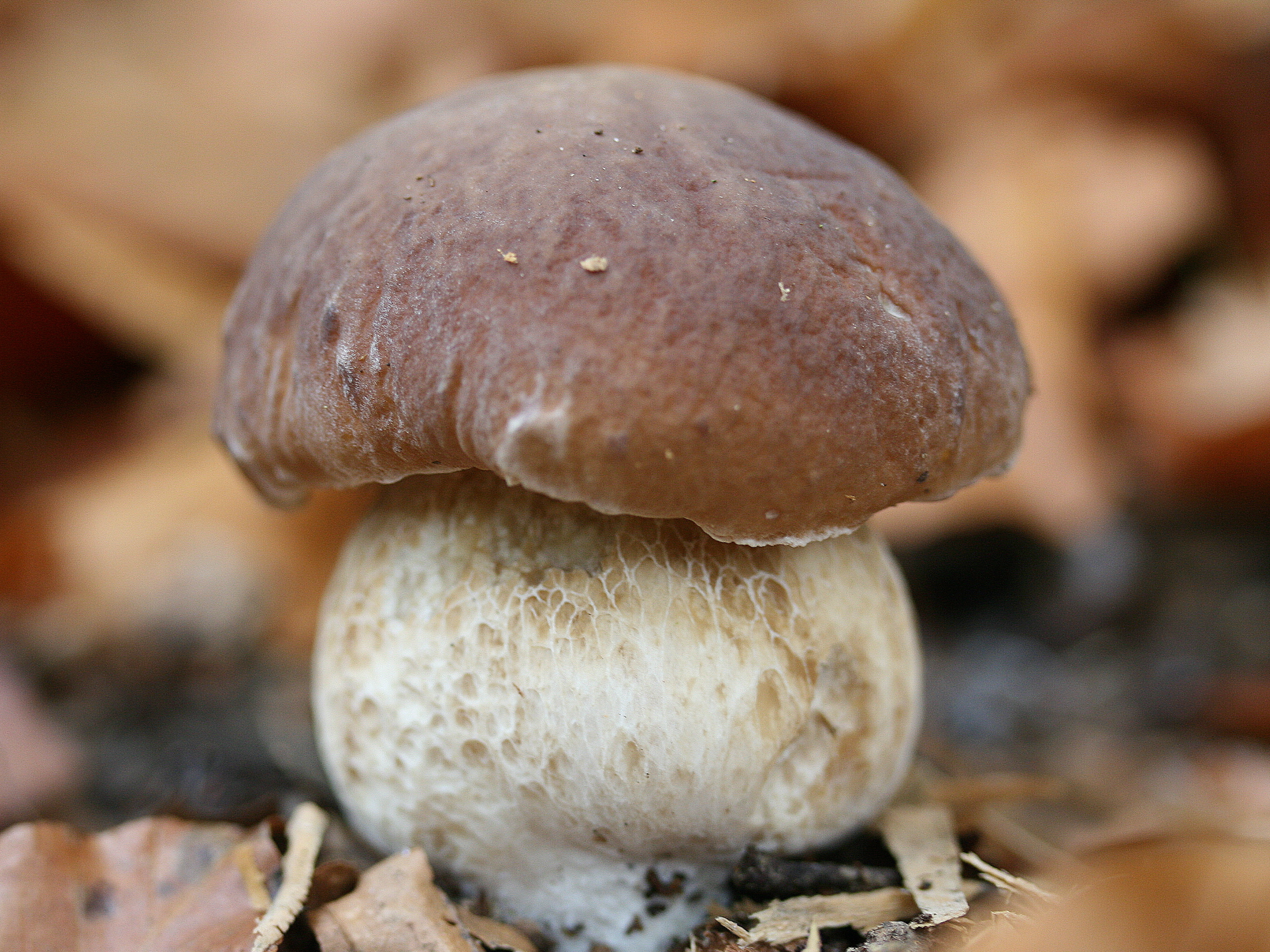
Bulbous stem

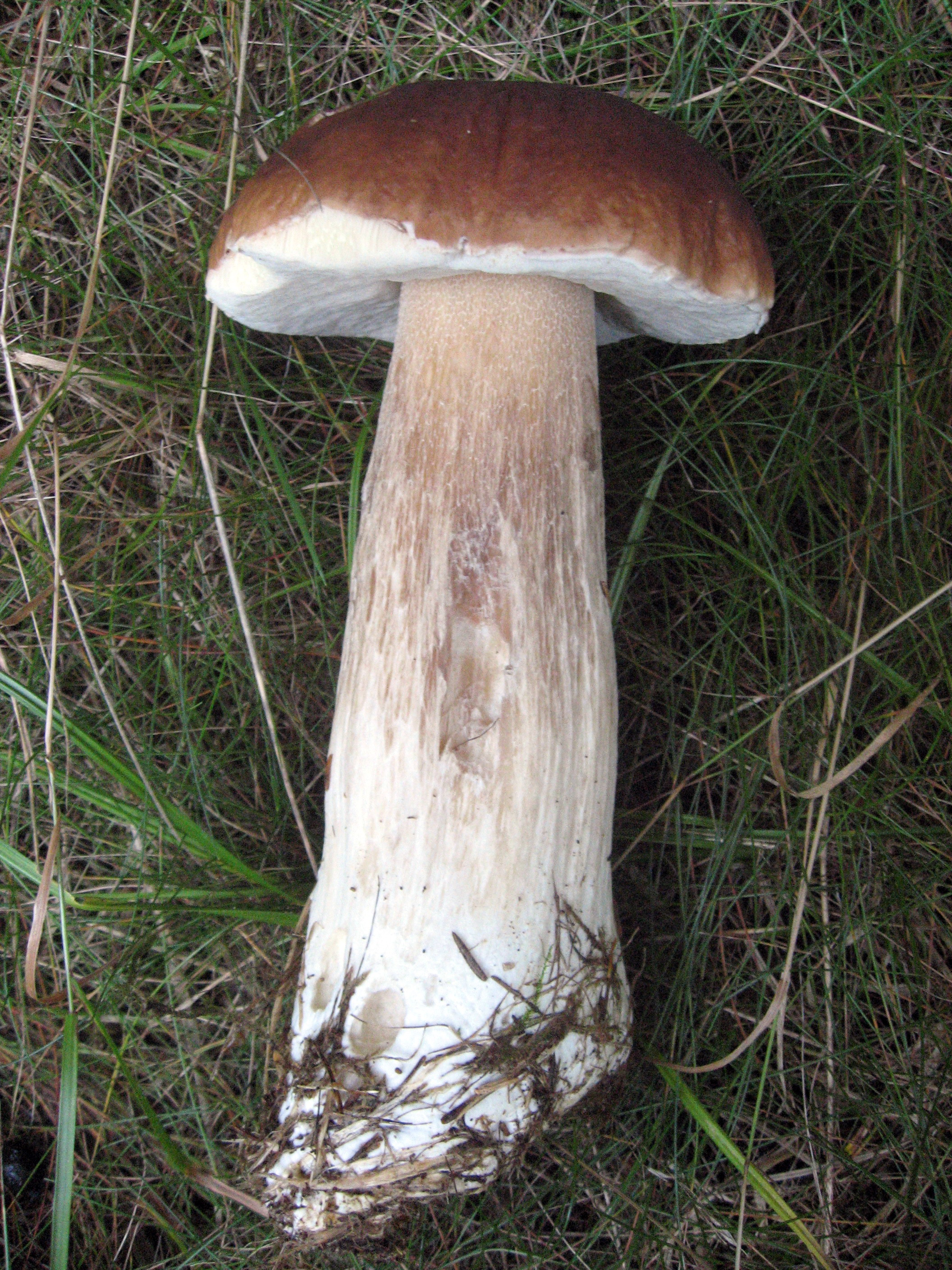
Mature stem

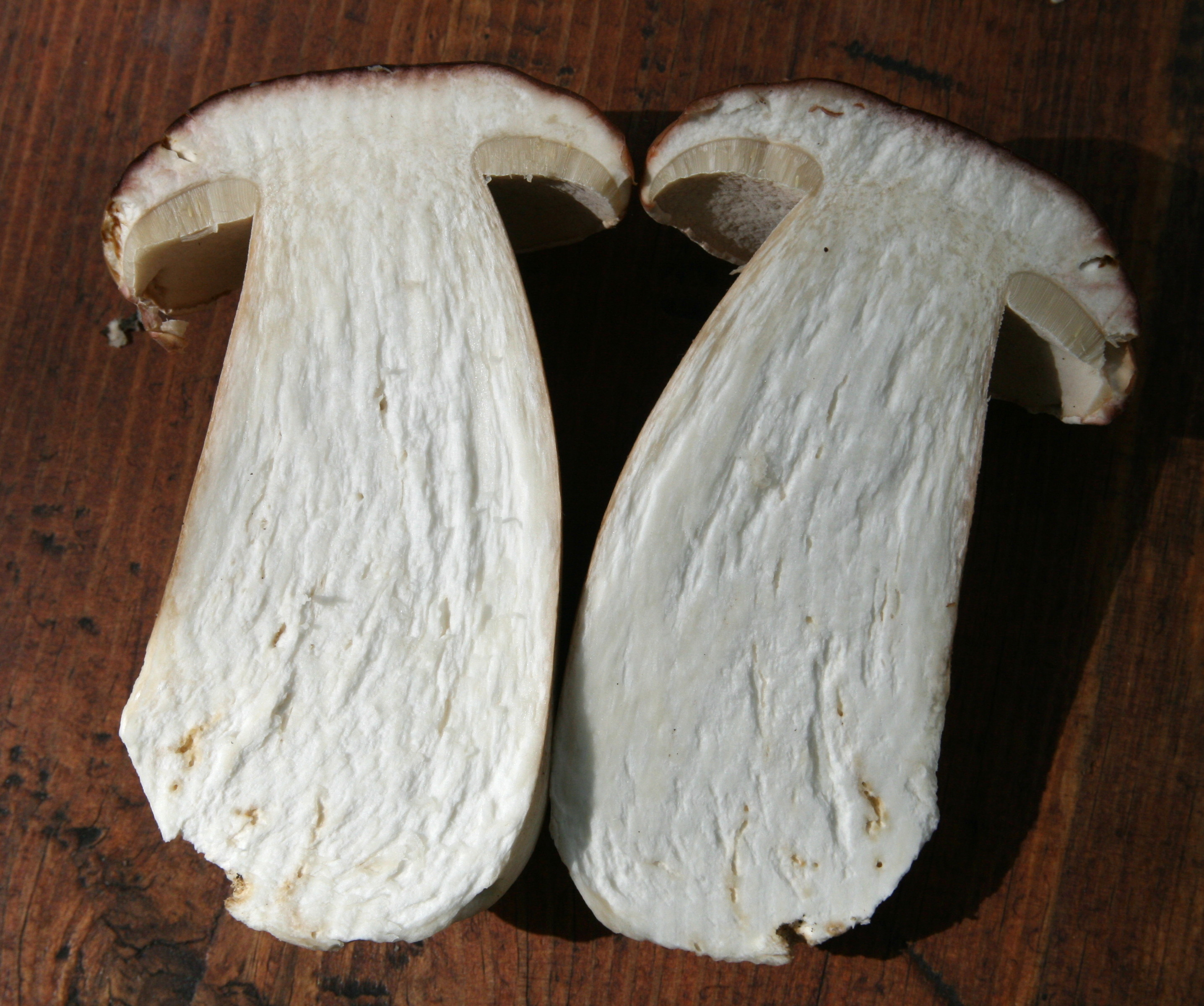
Cross-section

=== Similar species ===
Boletus edulis is considered one of the safest wild mushrooms to pick for the table, as few poisonous species closely resemble it and those that do may be easily distinguished by careful examination. The most similar poisonous mushroom may be the devil's bolete (Rubroboletus satanas), which has a similar shape, but has a red stem and stains blue on bruising. It is often confused with the very bitter and unpalatable Tylopilus felleus, but can be distinguished by the reticulation on the stalk; in porcini, it is a whitish, net-like pattern on a brownish stalk, whereas it is a dark pattern on white in the latter. Porcini have whitish pores while the other has pink. If in doubt, tasting a tiny bit of flesh will yield a bitter taste. It can also resemble the "bolete-like" Gyroporus castaneus, which is generally smaller, and has a browner stem. Boletus huronensis, an uncommon mushroom of northeastern North America, is another recognized look-alike known to cause severe gastrointestinal disorders.

==== Related species ====
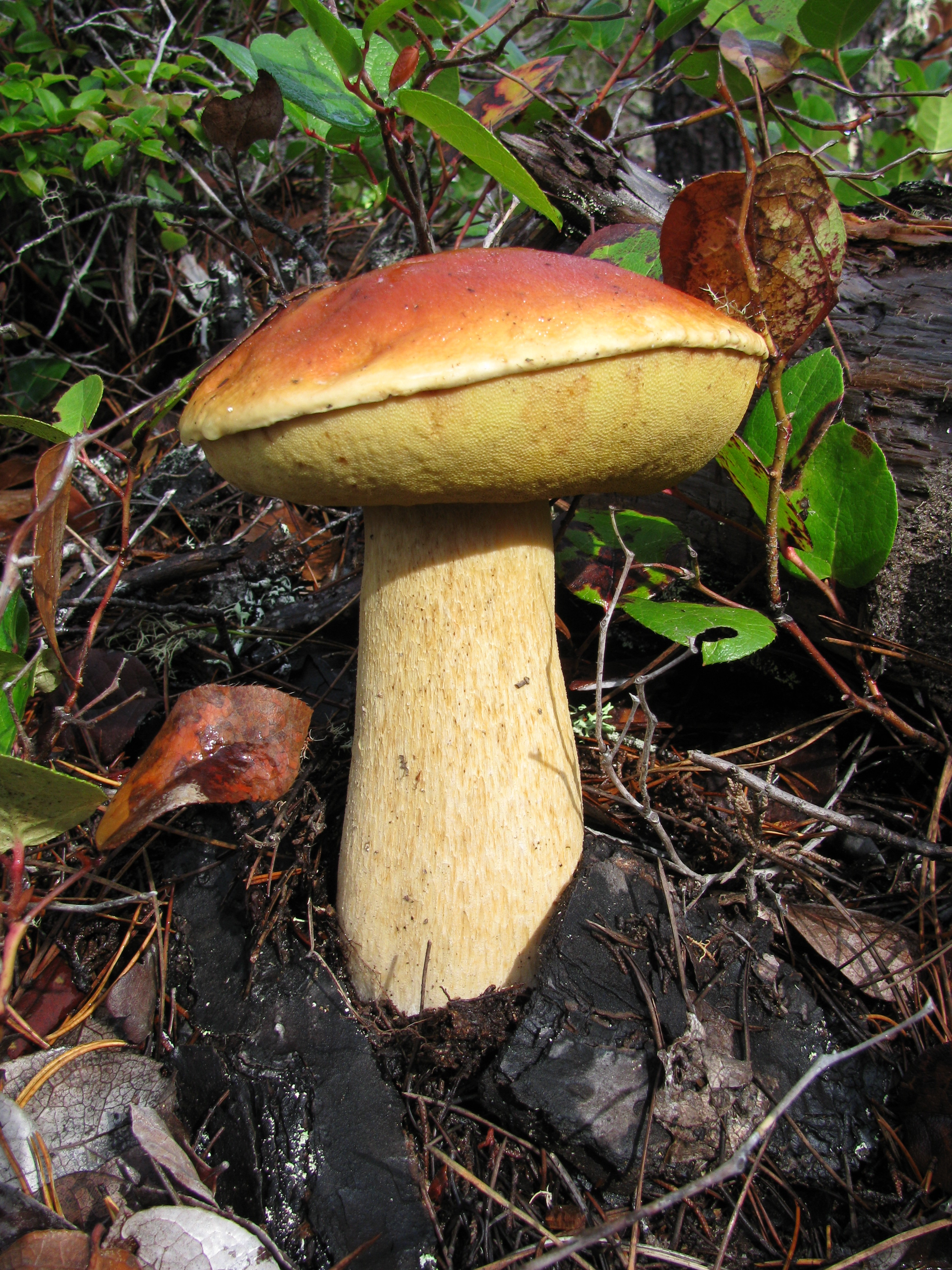
B. edulis var. grandedulis

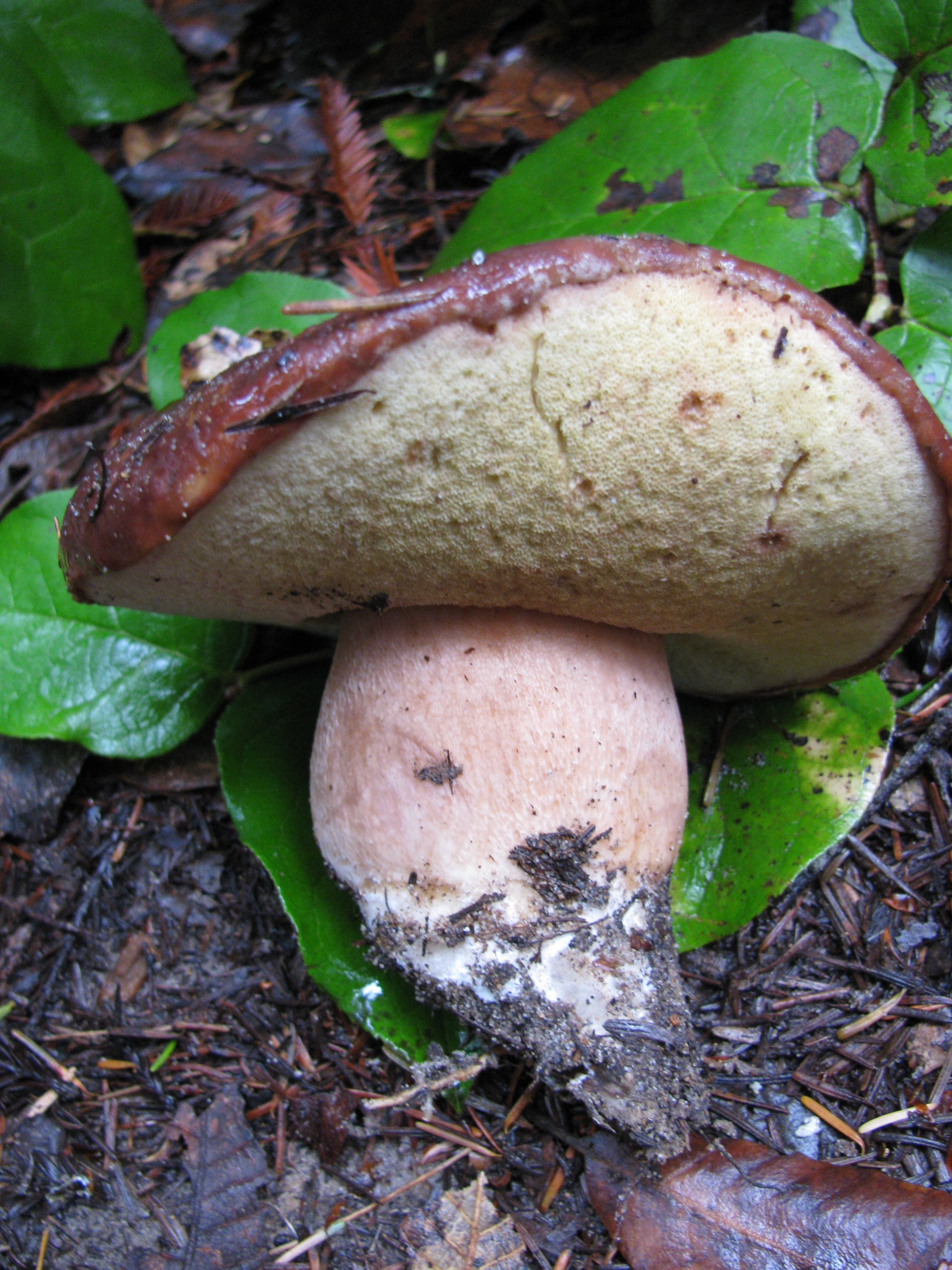
B. regineus

Several similar brownish-coloured species are sometimes considered subspecies or forms of this mushroom. In Europe, in addition to B. edulis (or cèpe de Bordeaux), the most popular are:

- Cèpe bronzé ("dark cep"; Boletus aereus), much rarer than B. edulis, is more highly regarded by gourmets and consequently more expensive. Usually smaller than B. edulis, it is also distinctively darker in colour. It is especially suited to drying.
- Cèpe des pins ("pine tree cep"; Boletus pinophilus or Boletus pinicola) grows among pine trees. Rarer than B. edulis, it is less appreciated by gourmets than the two other kinds of porcini, but remains a mushroom rated above most others.
- Cèpe d'été ("summer cep"; Boletus reticulatus), also less common and found earlier.

Molecular phylogenetic analyses have proven these three are all distinctive and separate species; other taxa formerly believed to be unique species or subspecies, such as B. betulicola, B. chippewaensis, B. persoonii, B. quercicola and B. venturii, are now known to be part of a B. edulis species complex with a wide morphological, ecological and geographic range, and that the genetic variability in this complex is low. Similar molecular technology has been developed to rapidly and accurately identify B. edulis and other commercially important fungi.

Three divergent lineages found in Yunnan province in China that are commonly marketed and sold as B. edulis (and are actually more closely related to B. aereus) were described in 2013 as B. bainiugan, B. meiweiniuganjun and B. shiyong. The classification has since been updated and expanded. All lineages are still members of Boletus sect. Boletus, the sensu stricto "porcini clade" of the genus.

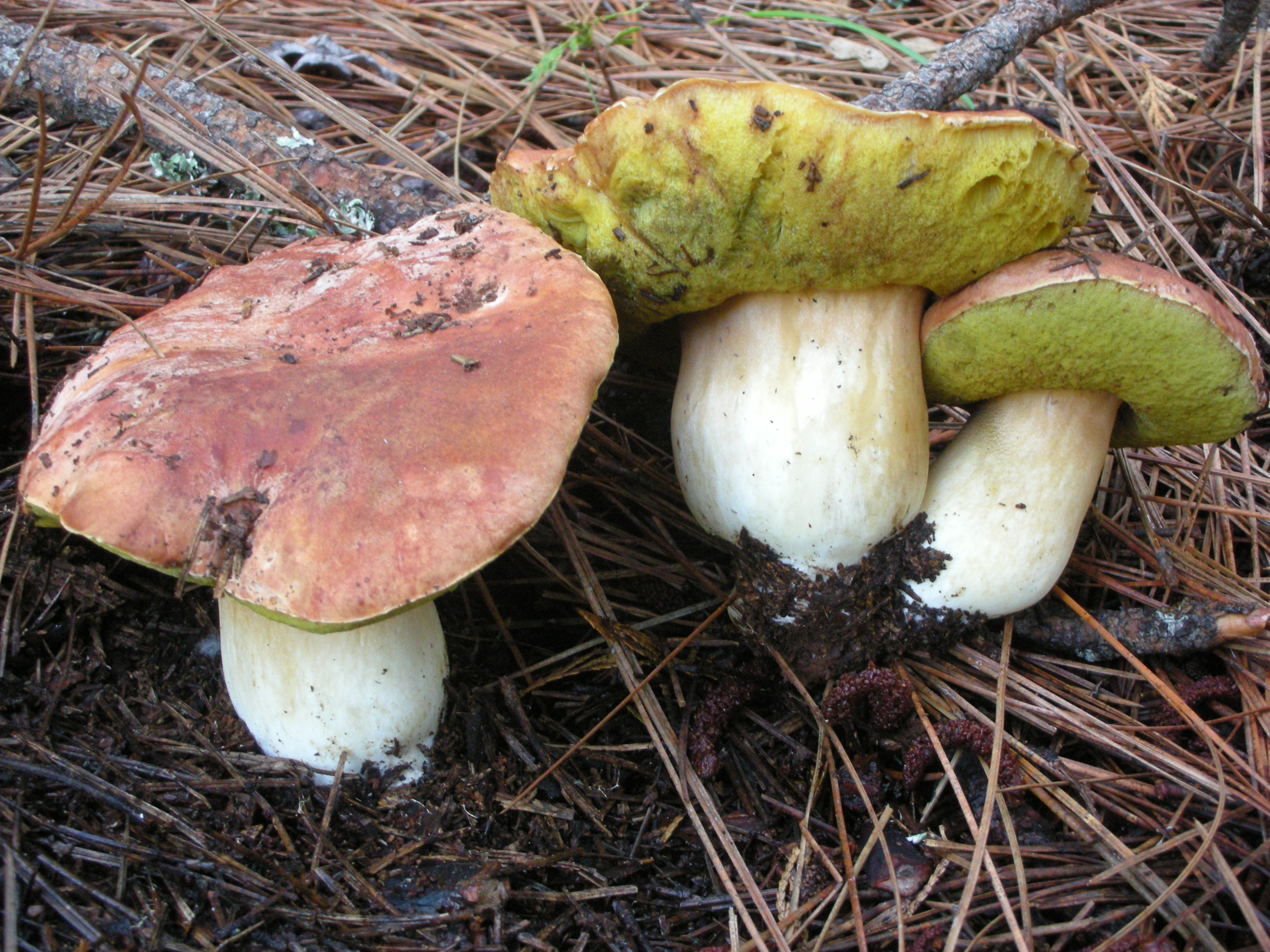
B. rex-veris

Western North America has several species closely related to B. edulis. The white king bolete (B. barrowsii), found in parts of Colorado, New Mexico, Arizona, and California (and possibly elsewhere), is named after its discoverer Chuck Barrows. It is lighter in colour than B. edulis, having a cream-coloured cap with pink tones; often mycorrhizal with Ponderosa pine, it tends to grow in areas where there is less rainfall. Some find its flavour as good as if not better than B. edulis. The California king bolete (Boletus edulis var. grandedulis) can reach massive proportions, and is distinguished from B. edulis by a mature pore surface that is brown to slightly reddish. The cap colour appears to be affected by the amount of light received during its development, and may range from white in young specimens grown under thick canopy, to dark-brown, red-brown or yellow brown in those specimens receiving more light. The queen bolete (Boletus regineus), formerly considered a variety of B. aereus, is also a choice edible. It is generally smaller than B. edulis, and unlike that species, is typically found in mixed forests. The spring king bolete (Boletus rex-veris), formerly considered a variety of B. edulis or B. pinophilus, is found throughout western North America. In contrast to B. edulis, B. rex-veris tends to fruit in clusters, and, as its common name suggests, appears in the spring. B. fibrillosus is edible but considered inferior in taste.

== Habitat and distribution ==
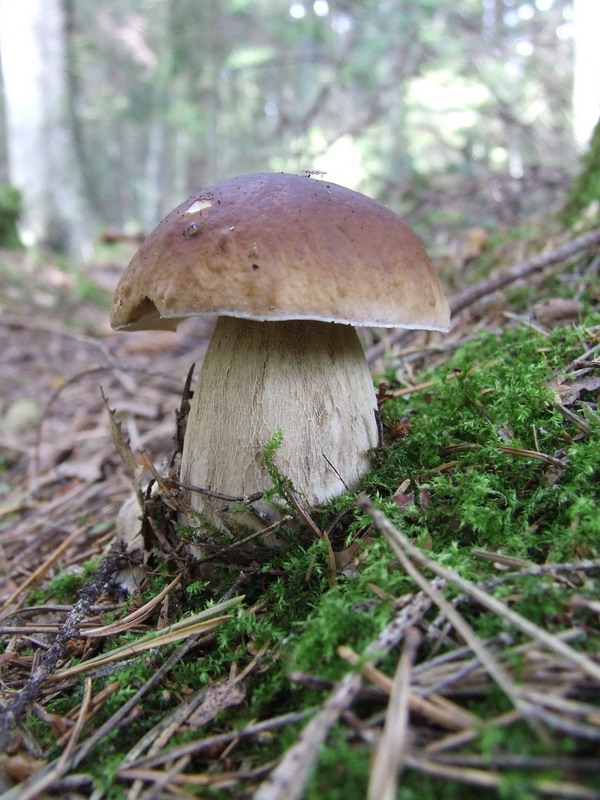
In Lithuania

The fruit bodies of Boletus edulis can grow singly or in small clusters of two or three specimens. The mushroom's habitat consists of areas dominated by pine (Pinus spp.), spruce (Picea spp.), hemlock (Tsuga spp.) and fir (Abies spp.) trees, although other hosts include chestnut, chinquapin, beech, Keteleeria spp., Lithocarpus spp., and oak. In California, porcini have been collected in a variety of forests, such as coastal forests, dry interior oak forests and savannas and interior high-elevation montane mixed forests, to an altitude of 3,500 m (11,500 ft). In northwestern Spain, they are common in scrublands dominated by the rock rose species Cistus ladanifer and Halimium lasianthum. In the Midi region of south-west France, they are especially favoured and locally called cèpe de Bordeaux after the town from which they are traded to the north and abroad.

Boletus edulis has a cosmopolitan distribution, concentrated in cool-temperate to subtropical regions. It is common in Europe—from northern Scandinavia, south to the extremities of Greece and Italy—and North America, where its southern range extends as far south as Mexico. It is well known from the Borgotaro area of Parma, Italy, and has PGI status there. The European distribution extends north to Scandinavia and south to southern Italy and Morocco. In North America, it can be found from May to October inland and August to January on the West Coast. In China, the mushroom can be found from the northeastern Heilongjiang to the Yunnan–Guizhou Plateau and Tibet. It has been recorded growing under Pinus and Tsuga in Sagarmatha National Park in Nepal, as well as in the Indian forests of Arunachal Pradesh. In West Asia, the species has been reported from the northwest forests of Iran.

=== Cultivation ===
Some steps have been made towards cultivating Boletus edulis, including mycorrhization of rockrose shrubs enhanced by helper bacteria.

=== Non-native introductions ===
Boletus edulis grows in some areas where it is not believed to be indigenous. It is often found underneath oak and silver birch in Hagley Park in central Christchurch, New Zealand, where it is likely to have been introduced, probably on the roots of container-grown beech, birch, and oak in the mid-19th century—around the time exotic trees began to be planted in the Christchurch area. Similarly, it has been collected in Adelaide Hills region of Australia in association with three species of introduced trees. It has been growing plentifully in association with pine forests in the southern KwaZulu-Natal Midlands in South Africa for more than 50 years and is believed to have been introduced with the import of pine trees. It also grows in pine plantations in neighboring Zimbabwe.

== Ecology ==
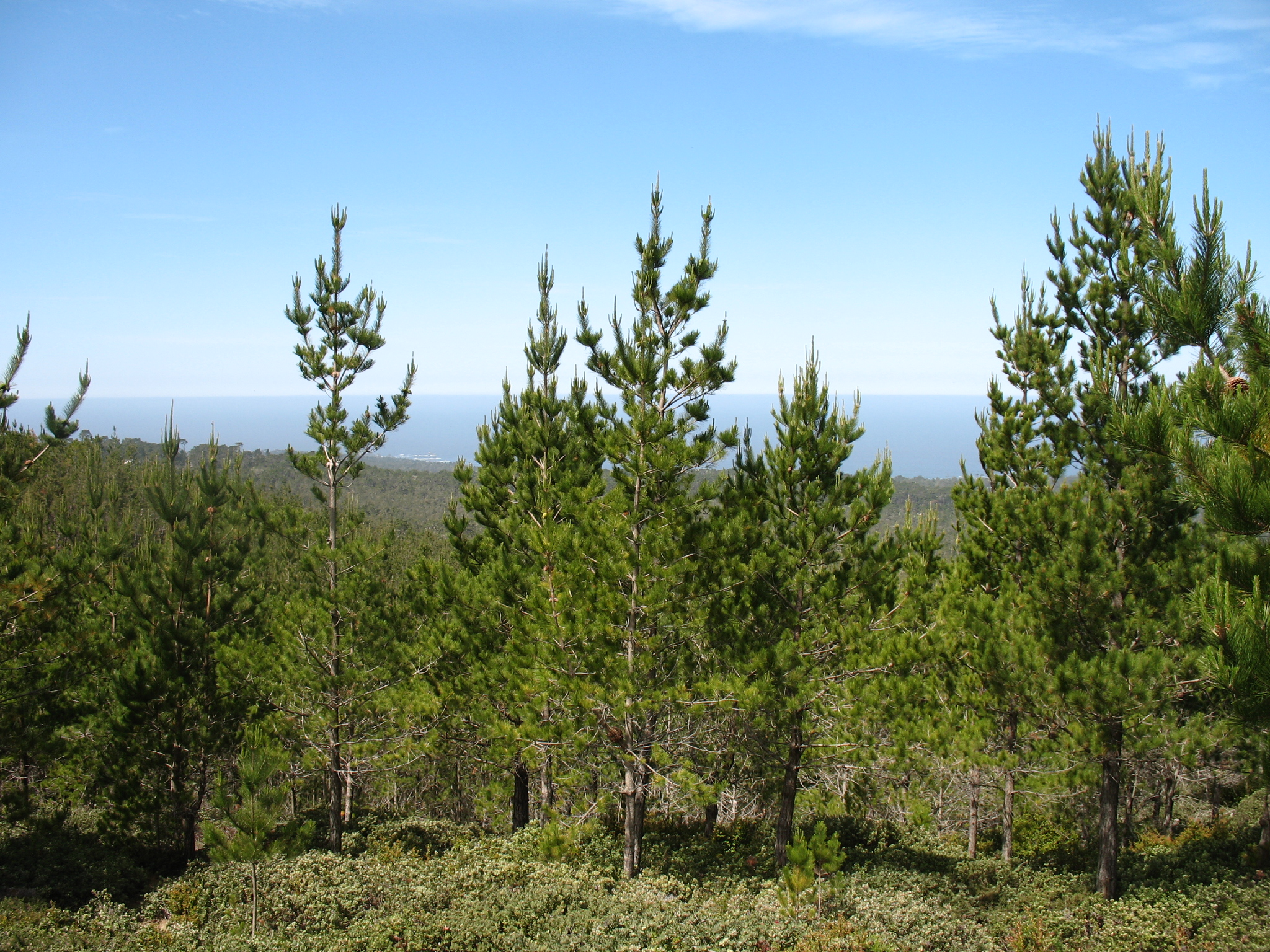
B. edulis is ectomycorrhizal and may co-occur with Pinus radiata.

=== Fruit body production ===
Italian folklore holds that porcini sprout up at the time of the new moon; research studies have tried to investigate more scientifically the factors that influence the production of fruit bodies. Although fruit bodies may appear any time from summer to autumn (June to November in the UK), their growth is known to be triggered by rainfall during warm periods of weather followed by frequent autumn rain with a drop in soil temperature. Above average rainfall may result in the rapid appearance of large numbers of boletes, in what is known in some circles as a "bolete year". A 2004 field study indicated that fruit body production is enhanced by an open and sunny wood habitat, corroborating an earlier observation made in a Zimbabwean study; removal of the litter layer on the forest floor appeared to have a negative effect on fruit body production, but previous studies reported contradictory results. A Lithuanian study conducted in 2001 concluded that the maximal daily growth rate of the cap (about 21 mm or 0.8 in) occurred when the relative air humidity was the greatest, and the fruit bodies ceased growing when the air humidity dropped below 40%. Factors most likely to inhibit the appearance of fruit bodies included prolonged drought, inadequate air and soil humidity, sudden decreases of night air temperatures, and the appearance of the first frost. Northern Hemisphere plots that face north tend to produce more mushrooms compared to equivalent plots facing south.

=== Mycorrhizal associations ===
Boletus edulis is mycorrhizal—it is in a mutualistic relationship with the roots of plants (hosts), in which the fungus exchanges nitrogen and other nutrients extracted from the environment for fixed carbon from the host. Other benefits for the plant are evident: in the case of the Chinese chestnut, the formation of mycorrhizae with B. edulis increases the ability of plant seedlings to resist water stress, and increases leaf succulence, leaf area, and water-holding ability. The fungus forms a sheath of tissue around terminal, nutrient-absorbing root tips, often inducing a high degree of branching in the tips of the host, and penetrating into the root tissue, forming, to some mycologists, the defining feature of ectomycorrhizal relationships, a hartig net. The ectomycorrhizal fungi are then able to exchange nutrients with the plant, effectively expanding the root system of the host plant to the furthest reaches of the symbiont fungi. Compatible hosts may belong to multiple families of vascular plants that are widely distributed throughout the Northern Hemisphere; according to one 1995 estimate, there are at least 30 host plant species distributed over more than 15 genera. Examples of mycorrhizal associates include Chinese red pine, Mexican weeping pine, Scots pine, Norway spruce, Coast Douglas-fir, mountain pine, and Virginia pine. The fungus has also been shown to associate with gum rockrose, a pioneer early stage shrub that is adapted for growth in degraded areas, such as burned forests. These and other rockrose species are ecologically important as fungal reservoirs, maintaining an inoculum of mycorrhizal fungi for trees that appear later in the forest regrowth cycle.

The mushroom has been noted to often co-occur with Amanita muscaria or A. rubescens, although it is unclear whether this is due to a biological association between the species, or because of similarities in growing season, habitat, and ecological requirements. An association has also been reported between B. edulis and Amanita excelsa on Pinus radiata ectomycorrhizae in New Zealand, suggesting that other fungi may influence the life cycle of porcini. A 2007 field study revealed little correlation between the abundance of fruit bodies and presence of its mycelia below ground, even when soil samples were taken from directly beneath the mushroom; the study concluded that the triggers leading to formation of mycorrhizae and production of the fruit bodies were more complex.

=== Heavy-metal contamination ===
Boletus edulis is known to be able to tolerate and even thrive on soil that is contaminated with toxic heavy metals, such as soil that might be found near metal smelters. The mushroom's resistance to heavy-metal toxicity is conferred by a biochemical called a phytochelatin—an oligopeptide whose production is induced after exposure to metal.

=== Pests and predators ===
The fruit bodies of B. edulis can be infected by the parasitic mould-like fungus Hypomyces chrysospermus, known as the bolete eater, which manifests itself as a white, yellow, or reddish-brown cottony layer over the surface of the mushroom. Some reported cases of stomach ache following consumption of dried porcini have been attributed to the presence of this mould on the fruit bodies. The mushroom is also used as a food source by several species of mushroom flies, as well as other insects and their larvae. An unidentified species of virus was reported to have infected specimens found in the Netherlands and in Italy; fruit bodies affected by the virus had relatively thick stems and small or no caps, leading to the name "little-cap disease".

Boletus edulis is a food source for animals such as the banana slug (Ariolimax columbianus), the long-haired grass mouse, the red squirrel, and, as noted in one isolated report, the fox sparrow.

== Culinary uses ==
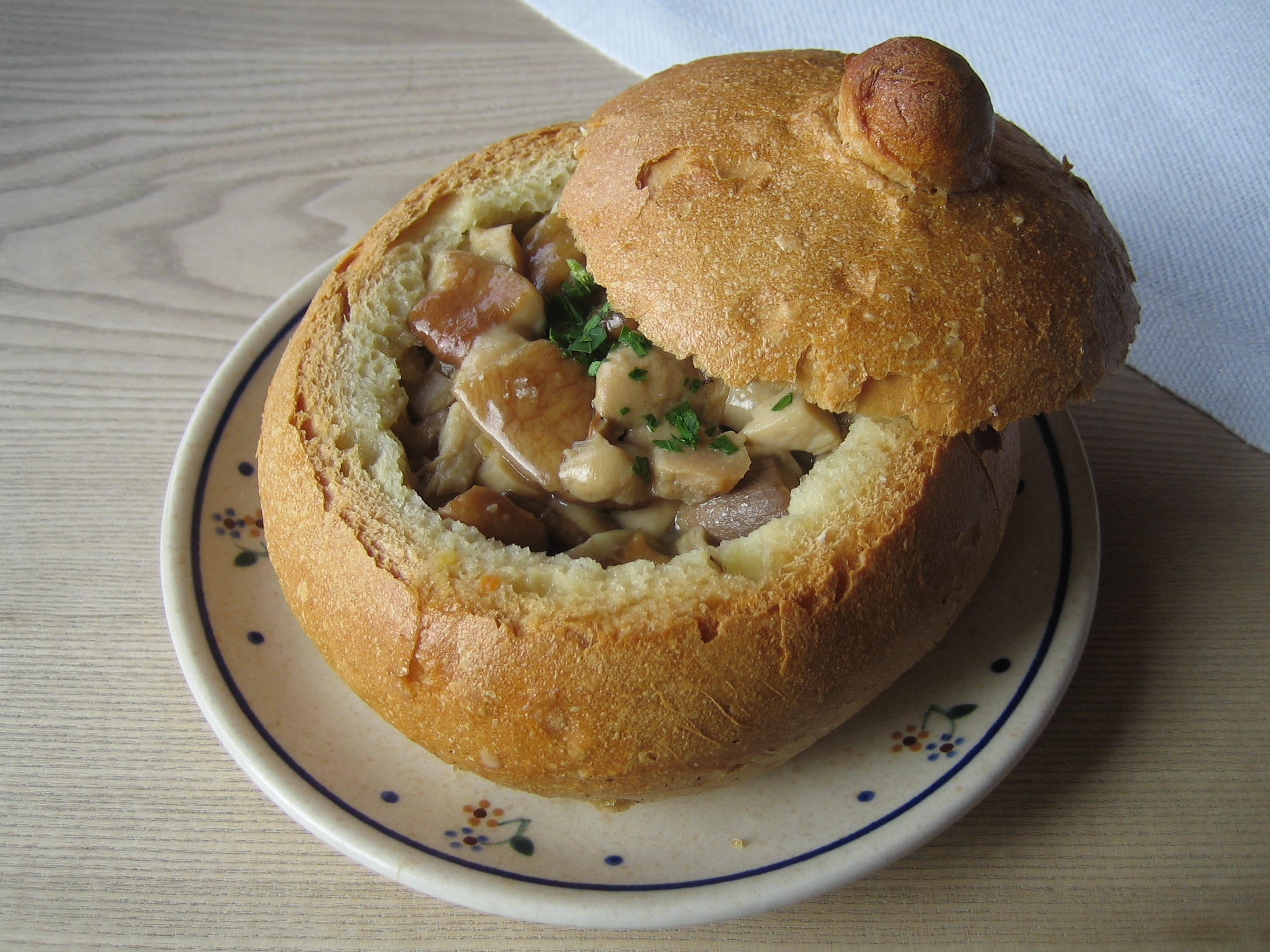
A porcini mushroom and noodle soup served in a bread bowl at a Polish restaurant

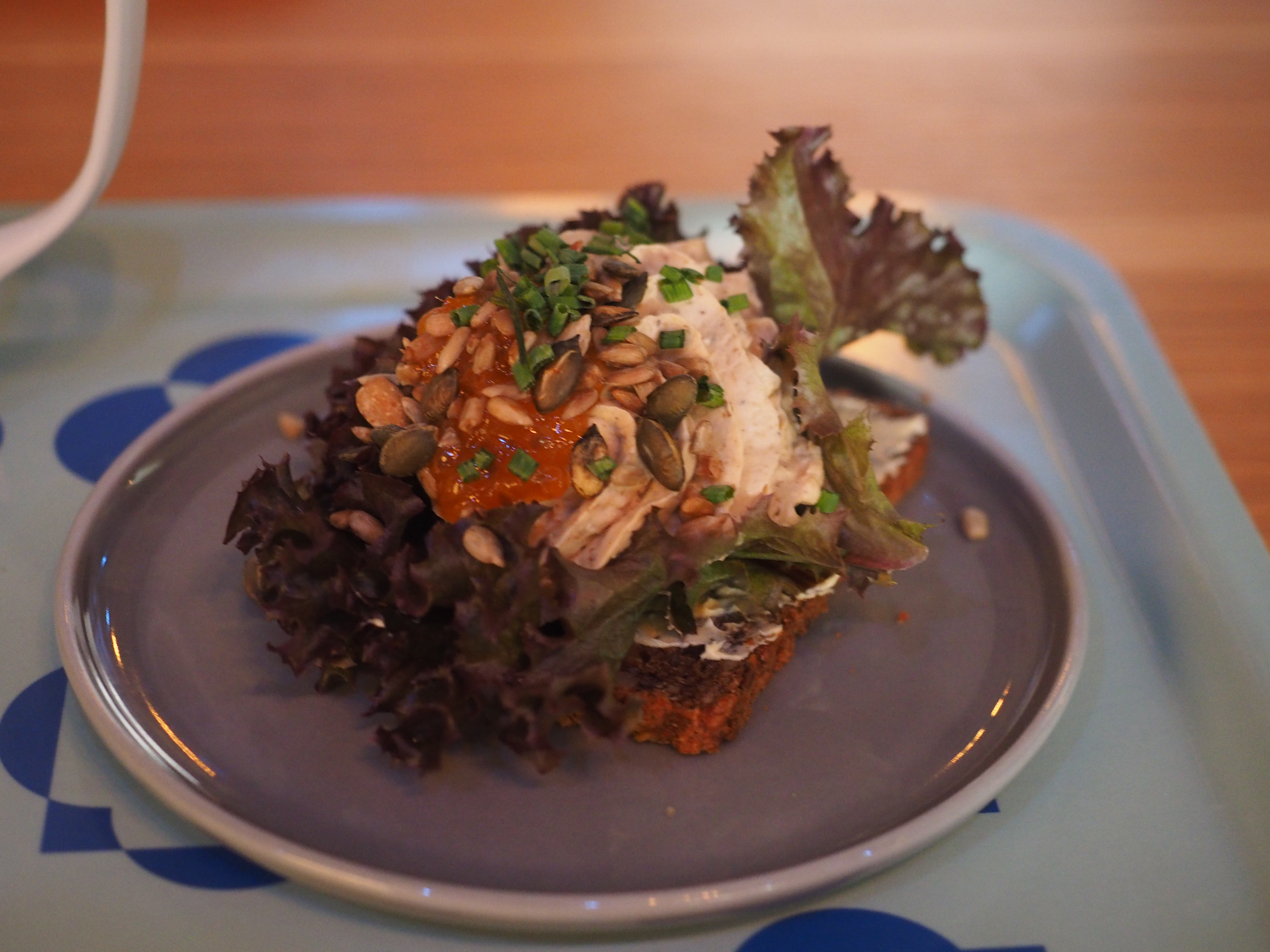
A porcini mushroom sandwich in Stockholm, Sweden

Boletus edulis, as the species epithet edulis (Latin: edible) indicates, is an edible mushroom. Italian chef and restaurateur Antonio Carluccio described it as representing "the wild mushroom par excellence", and hailed it as the most rewarding of all fungi in the kitchen for its taste and versatility. Considered a choice edible, particularly in France, Germany, Poland and Italy, it was widely written about by the Roman writers Pliny the Elder and Martial, although ranked below the esteemed Amanita caesarea. When he was served suilli (Note: The term suilli was also thought to encompass the related Leccinum scabrum.) instead of boleti, the disgruntled Martial wrote:

sunt tibi boleti; fungos ego sumo suillos (Ep. iii. 60)
("You eat the choice boletus, I have mushrooms that swine grub up.")

The flavour of porcini has been described as nutty and slightly meaty, with a smooth, creamy texture, and a distinctive aroma reminiscent of sourdough. Young, small porcini are most appreciated, as the large ones often harbour maggots (insect larvae), and become slimy, soft and less tasty with age. The fruit bodies are collected by holding the stipe near the base and twisting gently. Cutting the stipe with a knife may risk the part left behind rotting and the mycelium being destroyed. Peeling and washing are not recommended. The fruit bodies are highly perishable, due largely to the high water content (around 90%), the high level of enzyme activity, and the presence of a flora of microorganisms. Caution should be exercised when collecting specimens from potentially polluted or contaminated sites, as several studies have shown that the fruit bodies can bioaccumulate toxic heavy metals like mercury, cadmium, caesium and polonium. Bioaccumulated metals or radioactive fission decay products are like chemical signatures: chemical and radiochemical analysis can be used to identify the origin of imported specimens, and for long-term radioecological monitoring of polluted areas.

Porcini are sold fresh in markets in summer and autumn in Europe and Russia, and dried or canned at other times of the year, and distributed worldwide to countries where they are not otherwise found. They are eaten and enjoyed raw, sautéed with butter, ground into pasta, in soups, and in many other dishes. In France, they are used in recipes such as cèpes à la Bordelaise, cèpe frits and cèpe aux tomates. Porcini risotto is a traditional Italian autumn dish. Porcini are a feature of many cuisines, including Provençal, and Viennese. In Thailand they are used in soups and consumed blanched in salads. Porcini can also be frozen, either while raw or after cooking in butter. The colour, aroma, and taste of porcini deteriorate noticeably after being frozen for four months. Blanching (or soaking and blanching) as a processing step before freezing can extend the freezer life to 12 months. They are also one of the few species sold commercially as pickled mushrooms.

=== Dried ===
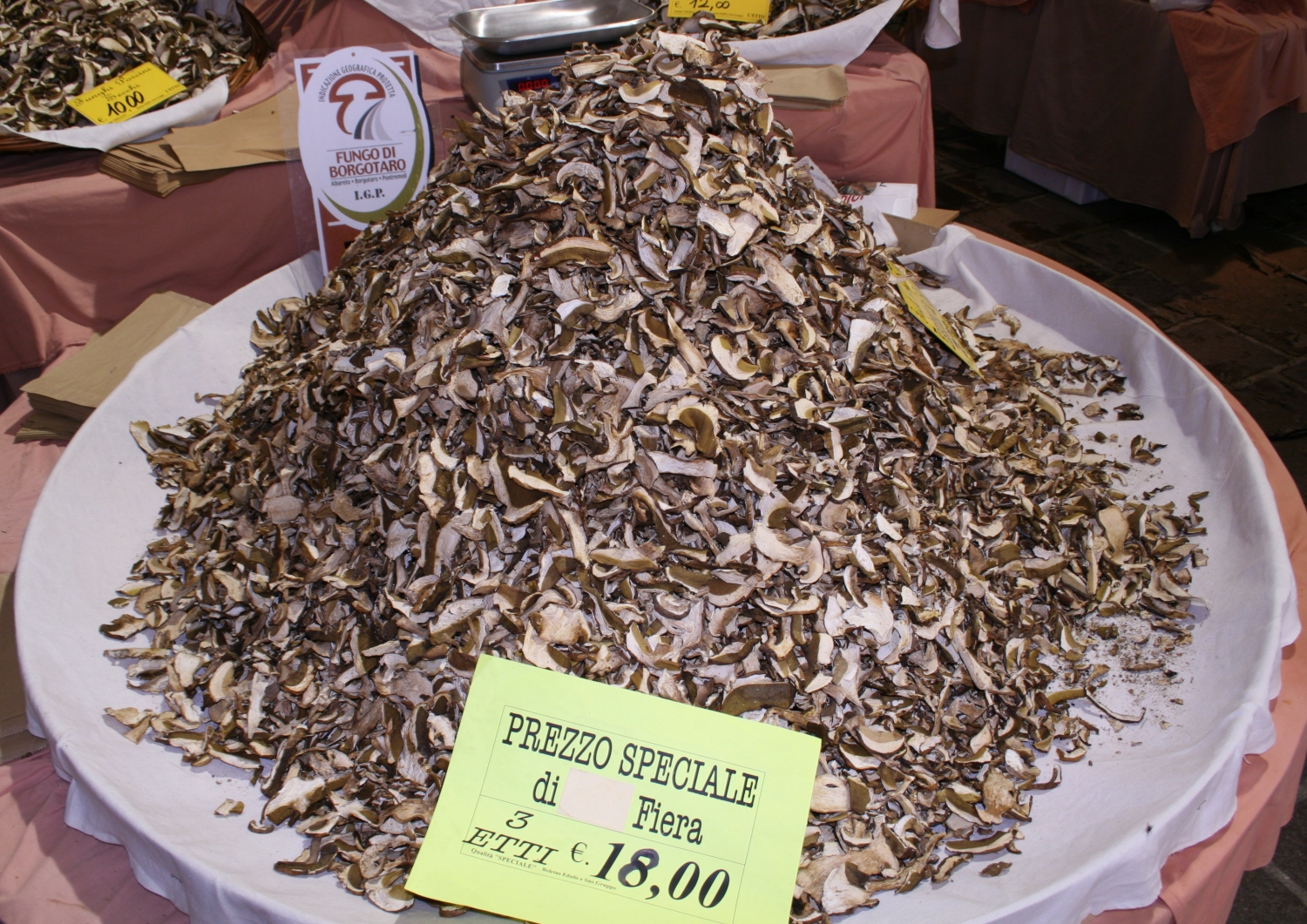
A pile of dried porcini at the Borgotaro porcino festival in Italy

Boletus edulis is well suited to drying—its flavour intensifies, it is easily reconstituted, and its resulting texture is pleasant. Reconstitution is done by soaking in hot, but not boiling, water for about twenty minutes; the water used is infused with the mushroom aroma and it too can be used in subsequent cooking, after filtering out particulate matter such as fine grit. Dried porcini have more protein than most other commonly consumed vegetables, apart from soybeans. Some of their protein is indigestible, though digestibility is improved with cooking.

Like other boletes, porcini can be dried by being strung separately on twine and hung close to the ceiling of a kitchen. Alternatively, the mushrooms can be dried by cleaning with a brush (washing is not recommended), and then placing them in a wicker basket or bamboo steamer on top of a boiler or hot water tank. Another method is drying in an oven at 25 to 30 °C (77 to 86 °F) for two to three hours, then increasing the temperature to 50 °C (122 °F) until crisp or brittle. Once dry, they must be kept in an airtight container. Importantly for commercial production, porcini retain their flavour after industrial preparation in a pressure cooker or after canning or bottling, and are thus useful for manufacturers of soups or stews. The addition of a few pieces of dried porcino can significantly add to flavour, and they are a major ingredient of the pasta sauce known as carrettiera (carter's sauce). The drying process is known to induce the formation of various volatile substances that contribute to the mushroom's aroma. Chemical analysis has shown that the odour of the dried mushroom is a complex mixture of 53 volatile compounds.

=== Commercial harvest ===
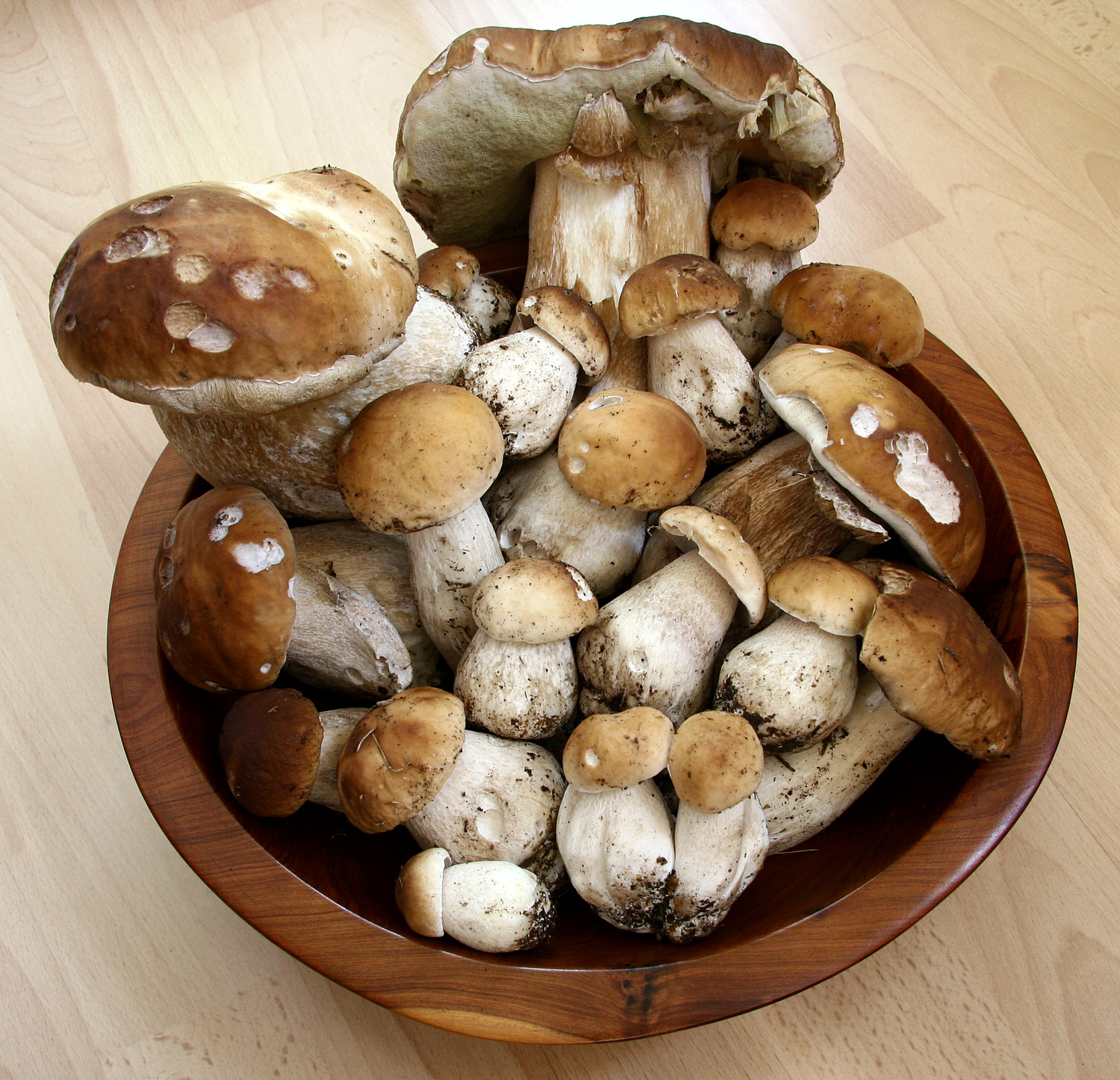
Porcini can vary considerably in size.

A 1998 estimate suggested that the total annual worldwide consumption of Boletus edulis and closely related species (B. aereus, B. pinophilus, and B. reticulatus) was between 20,000 and 100,000 tons. Approximately 2,700 tonnes (3,000 tons) were sold in France, Italy and Germany in 1988, according to official figures. The true amount consumed far exceeds this, as the official sales figures did not account for informal sales or consumption by collectors. They are widely exported and sold in dried form, reaching countries where they do not occur naturally, such as Australia and New Zealand. The autonomous community of Castile and León in Spain produces 7,700 tonnes (8,500 tons) annually. In autumn, the price of porcini in the Northern Hemisphere typically ranges between $20 and $80 per kilogram, although in New York in 1997 the wholesale price rose to more than $200 per kilogram due to scarcity.

In the vicinity of Borgotaro in the Province of Parma of northern Italy, the four species Boletus edulis, B. aereus, B. aestivalis and B. pinophilus have been recognised for their superior taste and officially termed Fungo di Borgotaro. Here these mushrooms have been collected for centuries and exported commercially. Owing to the globalisation of the mushroom trade most of the porcini commercially available in Italy or exported by Italy no longer originate there. Porcini and other mushrooms are also imported into Italy from various locations, especially China and eastern European countries; these are then often re-exported under the "Italian porcini" label.

In Italy the disconnect with local production has had an adverse effect on quality; for example in the 1990s some of the dried porcino mushrooms exported to Italy from China contained species of genus Tylopilus, which are rather similar in appearance and when dried are difficult for both mushroom labourers and mycologists alike to distinguish from Boletus. Tylopilus species typically have a very bitter taste, which is imparted to the flavour of the porcini with which they are mixed.

After the fall of the Iron Curtain and the subsequent reduction of economic and political barriers, central and eastern European countries with local mushroom harvesting traditions, such as Albania, Bulgaria, Macedonia, Romania, Serbia and Slovenia, developed into exporters of porcini, concentrating primarily on the Italian market. Porcini and other wild fungi from these countries are also destined for France, Germany and other western European markets, where demand for them exists but collection on a commercial scale does not. Picking B. edulis has become an annual seasonal income earner and pastime in countries like Bulgaria, especially for many Roma communities and the unemployed. A lack of control of the harvest has led to heavy exploitation of the mushroom resource.

Like many other strictly mycorrhizal fungi, B. edulis has eluded cultivation attempts for years. The results of some studies suggest that unknown components of the soil microflora might be required for B. edulis to establish a mycorrhizal relationship with the host plant. Successful attempts at cultivating B. edulis have been made by Spanish scientists by mycorrhization of Cistus species, with Pseudomonas fluorescens bacteria helping the mycorrhiza.

Boletus edulis, fresh
Nutritional value per 100 g (3.5 oz)
- Energy: 342.4 kJ (81.8 kcal)
- Carbohydrates: 9.23 g
- Fat: 1.70 g
- Protein: 7.39 g
Vitamins and minerals
Vitamins	Quantity %DV^{†}
Thiamine (B1)	9% 0.105 mg
Riboflavin (B2)	7% 0.092 mg
Niacin (B3)	38% 6.07 mg
Pantothenic acid (B5)	53% 2.64 mg
Vitamin B6	3% 0.051 mg
Folate (B9)	73% 290 μg
Vitamin C	5% 4.21 mg
Minerals	Quantity %DV^{†}
Calcium	0% 1.195 mg
Copper	87% 0.786 mg
Iron	4% 0.739 mg
Phosphorus	2% 22.26 mg
Potassium	7% 203.3 mg
Zinc	38% 4.172 mg
- ^{†}Percentages estimated using US recommendations for adults, except for potassium, which is estimated based on expert recommendation from the National Academies.

== Nutrition ==
Boletus edulis mushrooms are 9% carbohydrates, 3% fat, and 7% protein (table). Fresh mushrooms consist of over 80% moisture, although reported values tend to differ somewhat as moisture content can be affected by environmental temperature and relative humidity during growth and storage. The carbohydrate component contains the monosaccharides glucose, mannitol and α,α-trehalose, the polysaccharide glycogen, and the water-insoluble structural polysaccharide chitin, which accounts for up to 80–90% of dry matter in mushroom cell walls. Chitin, hemicellulose, and pectin-like carbohydrates—all indigestible by humans—contribute to the high proportion of insoluble fibre in B. edulis.

The total lipid, or crude fat, content makes up 3% of the dry matter of the mushroom. The proportion of fatty acids (expressed as a % of total fatty acids) are: linoleic acid 42%, oleic acid 36%, palmitic acid 10%, and stearic acid 3%.

A comparative study of the amino acid composition of eleven Portuguese wild edible mushroom species showed Boletus edulis to have the highest total amino acid content.

B. edulis mushrooms are rich in the dietary minerals, sodium, iron, calcium, and magnesium, with amounts varying according to the mushroom component and to soil composition in the geographic region of China where they were sampled. They also have high content of B vitamins and tocopherols. B. edulis contains appreciable amounts of selenium, a trace mineral, although the bioavailability of mushroom-derived selenium is low.

== Phytochemicals and research ==
Phytochelatins give B. edulis resistance to toxic heavy metals like cadmium.

Boletus edulis fruit bodies contain diverse phytochemicals, including 500 mg of ergosterol per 100 g of dried mushroom, and ergothioneine. The fruit bodies contain numerous polyphenols, especially a high content of rosmarinic acid, and organic acids (such as oxalic, citric, malic, succinic and fumaric acids), and alkaloids.

=== Aroma ===
Aroma compounds giving B. edulis mushrooms their characteristic fragrance include some 100 components, such as esters and fatty acids. In a study of aroma compounds, 1-octen-3-one was the most prevalent chemical detected in raw mushrooms, with pyrazines having increased aroma effect and elevated content after drying.

== In human culture ==
In 2023, with the signing of bill H.B. 92, Boletus edulis became the state mushroom of Utah.

== See also ==
- List of Boletus species
- List of North American boletes
