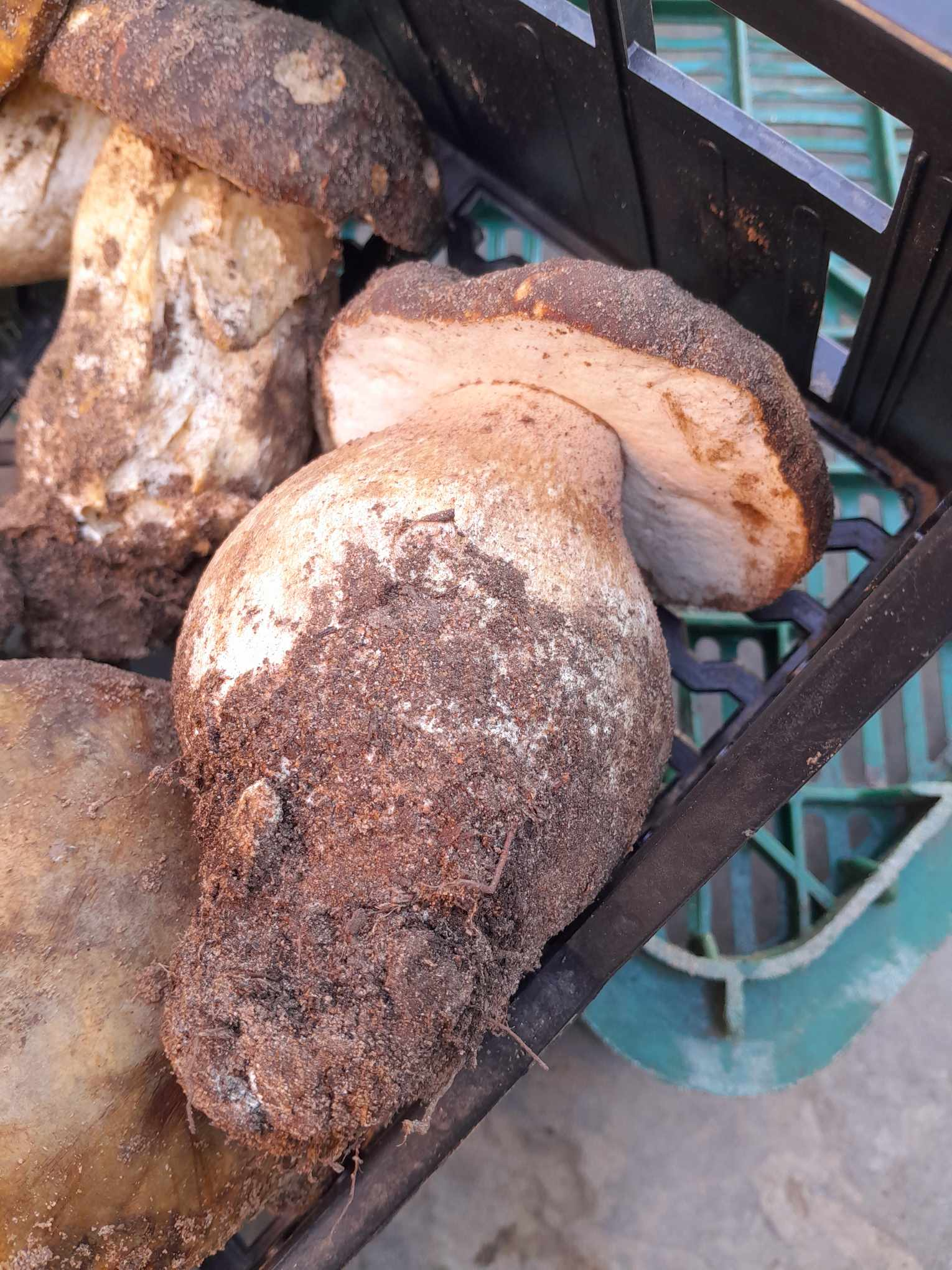
- An example of the mushroom

Scientific classification
- Kingdom: Fungi
- Division: Basidiomycota
- Class: Agaricomycetes
- Order: Boletales
- Family: Boletaceae
- Genus: Boletus
- Species: B. mamorensis

Binomial name
- Boletus mamorensis Redeuilh

= Boletus mamorensis =

Species of fungus

Boletus mamorensis is an edible fungus of the genus Boletus native to Morocco. It is closely related to B. aereus.

== See also ==
- List of Boletus species
