= Jean-Jacques Paulet =

French mycologist

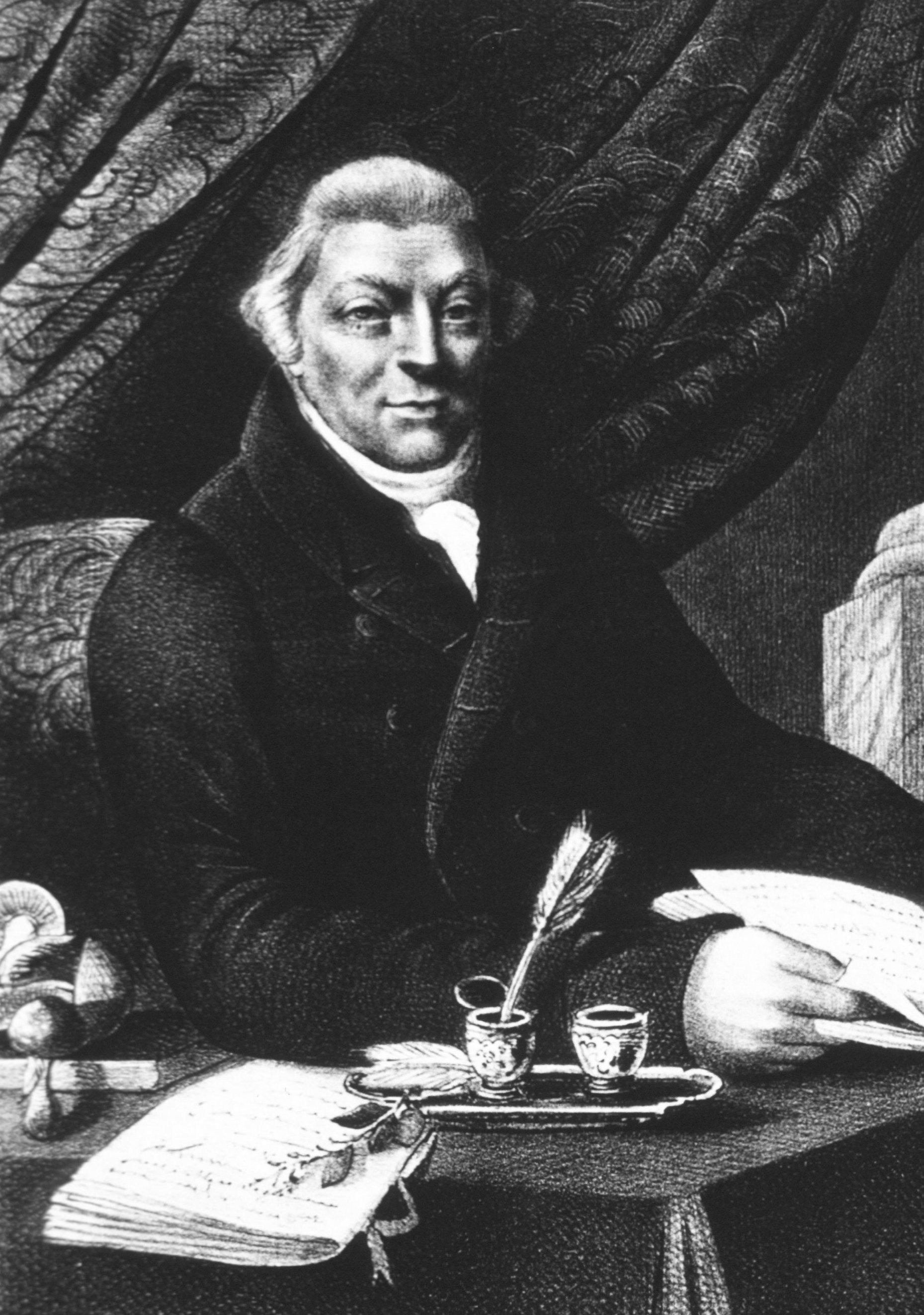
Jean-Jacques Paulet

Jean-Jacques Paulet (26 April 1740 – 4 August 1826) was a French mycologist.

Paulet was born in Anduze, France and studied medicine in Montpellier, where he received his PhD in March 1764. He published in Paris in 1765 a book titled d’Histoire de la petite vérole, avec les moyens d’en préserver les enfants... (History of smallpox, with the means to protect children ...), which was followed by a French translation of the book on smallpox by Abu Bakr Mohammad Ibn Zakariya al-Razi (ninth or tenth century). He completed this series of works by three more books, published in Paris between 1768 and 1776, in which he outlined wide-scale measures of smallpox protection.

Paulet was interested in ergotism and published several studies in Mémoires de l’Académie de médecine alongside such scientist as Henri Alexandre Tessier (1741–1837) and Charles Jacques Saillant (1747–1814). He was also known for his opposition to the animal magnetism.

In 1805 he published a treatise on the bite of asp viper and in 1815 a review of the history of medicine by Sprengel. His expertise in mycology was summarized in Traité complet sur les champignons (1775) which was considered a seminal work on fungi. It will be followed in 1791 by Traité complet sur les champignons and two other books on botany: Examen de l’ouvrage de M. Stackhouse sur les genres de plantes de Théophraste (1816) and La Botanique ou Flore et Faune de Virgile (1824). Paulet was elected to the French Academy of Sciences in the section of medicine and surgery on 22 October 1821.
