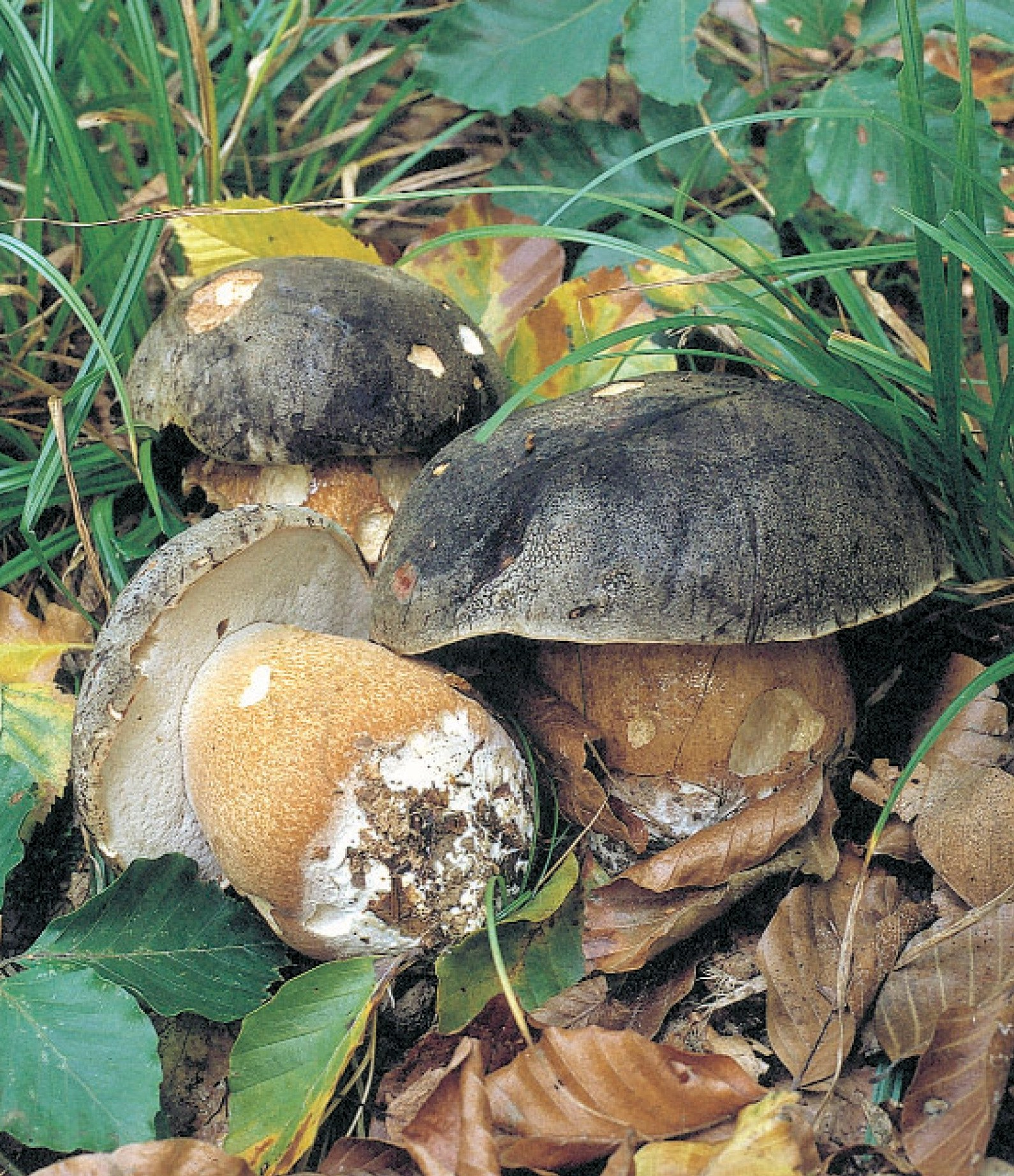

Scientific classification
- Kingdom: Fungi
- Division: Basidiomycota
- Class: Agaricomycetes
- Order: Boletales
- Family: Boletaceae
- Genus: Boletus
- Species: B. aereus

Binomial name
- Boletus aereus Bull. (1789)

Synonyms
- Dictyopus aereus (Bull.) Quél. (1886); Tubiporus edulis subsp. aereus (Bull.) Maire (1937); Boletus edulis f. aereus (Bull.) Vassilkov (1966); Boletus aereus var. squarrosus De Rezende Pinto (1940); Boletus mamorensis Redeuilh (1978)

= Boletus aereus =

Edible species of fungus

Boletus aereus
- Mycological characteristics
- Pores on hymenium
- Cap is convex
- Hymenium is adnate
- Stipe is bare
- Spore print is olive-brown
- Ecology is mycorrhizal
- Edibility is choice

Boletus aereus, commonly known as the queen bolete, dark cep, or bronze bolete, is a species of fungus in the family Boletaceae. Described in 1789 by French mycologist Pierre Bulliard, it is closely related to several other European boletes, including B. reticulatus, B. pinophilus, and the popular B. edulis. Some populations in North Africa have in the past been classified as a separate species, B. mamorensis, which has been shown to be phylogenically conspecific to B. aereus and is now regarded as a synonym.

The fungus produces spore-bearing fruit bodies above ground in summer and autumn. The fruit body has a large dark brown cap, which can reach 30 cm (12 in) in diameter. Like other boletes, B. aereus has tubes extending downward from the underside of the cap, rather than gills. The spores escape at maturity through the tube openings, or pores. The pore surface of the fruit body is whitish when young, but ages to a greenish-yellow. The squat brown stipe, or stem, is up to 15 cm (6 in) tall and 10 cm (4 in) thick and partially covered with a raised network pattern, or reticulation.

The fungus predominantly grows in habitats with broad-leaved trees and shrubs, forming symbiotic ectomycorrhizal associations in which the underground roots of these plants are enveloped with sheaths of fungal tissue (hyphae). The cork oak (Quercus suber) is a key host. A highly prized and sought-after edible mushroom, B. aereus is widely consumed throughout the Mediterranean.

== Taxonomy ==
French mycologist Pierre Bulliard described Boletus aereus in 1789. The species epithet is the Latin adjective aerěus, meaning "made with bronze or copper". His countryman Lucien Quélet transferred the species to the now-obsolete genus Dictyopus in 1886, which resulted in the synonym Dictyopus aereus, while René Maire reclassified it as a subspecies of B. edulis in 1937. In 1940, Manuel Cabral de Rezende-Pinto published the variety B. aereus var. squarrosus from collections made in Brazil, but this taxon is not considered to be taxonomically distinct.

In works published before 1987, the binomial name was written fully as Boletus aereus Fr., as the description by Bulliard had been sanctioned (i.e., treated as if conserved against earlier homonyms and competing synonyms) in 1821 by the "father of mycology", Swedish naturalist Elias Magnus Fries. The starting date for all the mycota had been set by general agreement as 1 January 1821, the date of Fries' work. The 1987 edition of the International Code of Botanical Nomenclature revised the rules on the starting date and primary work for names of fungi; names can now be considered valid as far back as 1 May 1753, hence predating publication of Bulliard's work.

Moroccan collections under the cork oak (Quercus suber) that were initially regarded as B. aereus, were described as a separate species—Boletus mamorensis—in 1978, on the basis of a rufous chestnut cap and a rooting stipe, or stem, with a reticulation often limited to the top (apex). However, molecular phylogenetic studies by Bryn Dentinger and colleagues in 2010, placed these collections very close to B. aereus, suggesting they are more likely an ecological variant or phenotype, rather than a distinct species. More recent phylogenetic studies by M. Loizides and colleagues in 2019, have confirmed that B. mamorensis is a later synonym of B. aereus, since collections identified as the two taxa could not be genetically separated and nested in the same clade.

American mycologist Harry Thiers reported Boletus aereus from California in 1975; a taxonomic revision of western North American porcini boletes in 2008 formally established them as a separate species, Boletus regineus. These differ from B. aereus by nature of their more gelatinous cap skin (pileipellis), and belong in a different porcini lineage.

Boletus aereus is classified in Boletus section Boletus, alongside close relatives such as B. reticulatus, B. edulis, and B. pinophilus. A genetic study of the four European species found that B. aereus was sister to B. reticulatus. More extensive testing of worldwide taxa revealed that B. aereus was sister to a lineage that had split into B. reticulatus and two lineages that had been classified as B. edulis from southern China and Korea/northern China respectively. Molecular analysis suggests that the B. aereus/mamorensis and B. reticulatus/Chinese B. "edulis" lineages diverged around 6 to 7 million years ago.

=== Common names ===
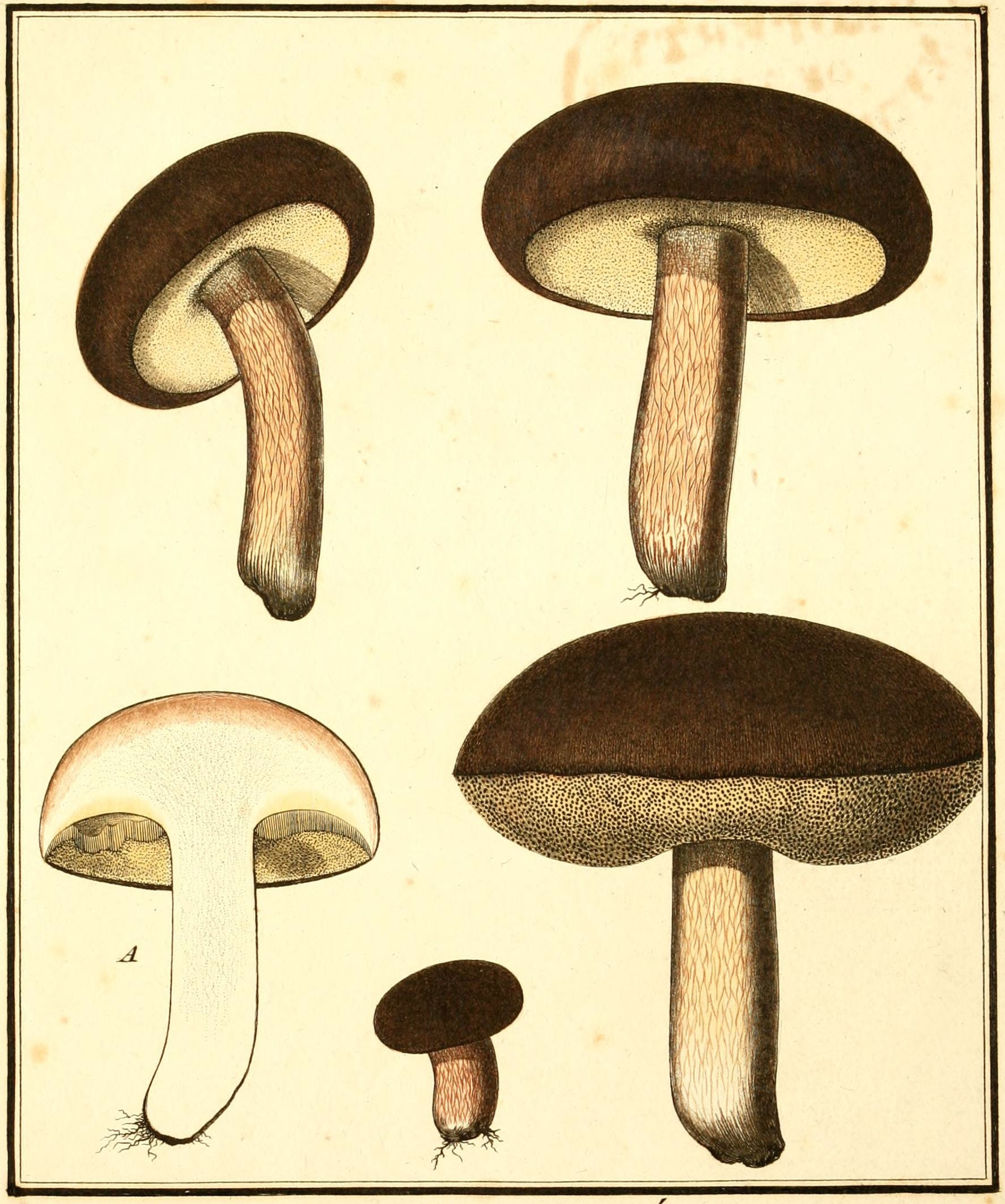
Boletus aereus illustrated in Bulliard's 1789 work Champignons de la France

Bulliard gave Boletus aereus the common name of le bolet bronzé (the bronze bolete) in 1789, noting that it was called the cep noir (black cep) in other countries. It is commonly known as ontto beltza (black fungus) in Basque, porcino nero (black piglet) in Italian, and Cèpe bronzé in French. In Greek it is known as vasilikό (the royal one), or kalogeraki (little monk). The English common name is dark cep, while the British Mycological Society also approved the name bronze bolete.

== Description ==
The cap is hemispherical to convex, reaching 15–20 cm (6–8 in) in diameter, although specimens of 40 cm (16 in) have been found in some cases. Slightly velvety, it is dark brown when young, greyish-brown, violet brown, or purple brown, often with copper, golden, or olivaceous patches. The stipe is 5–15 cm (2–6 in) long and 2–5 cm (3/4–2 in) thick, usually shorter than the cap diameter, initially barrel shaped but gradually becoming club shaped and tapering at the base. The stipe is white then brown, chestnut, or reddish brown in colour, covered in a brown or concolorous reticulation.

As with other boletes, there are tubes rather than gills on the underside of the cap. The tube openings—known as pores—are small and rounded. Whitish when young, they slowly become yellowish or greenish yellow at maturity, and can turn wine coloured with bruising. The tubes themselves are initially white, later becoming yellowish or olivaceous. The thick flesh is white, exudes a robust and pleasant smell reminiscent of hazelnuts, and has a mild sweet taste.

The spores are spindle shaped and measure 10.5–19 by 4–7 μm. The pileipellis is a trichodermium of interwoven septate hyphae, with long cylindrical cells.

=== Similar species ===
Boletus lookalikes

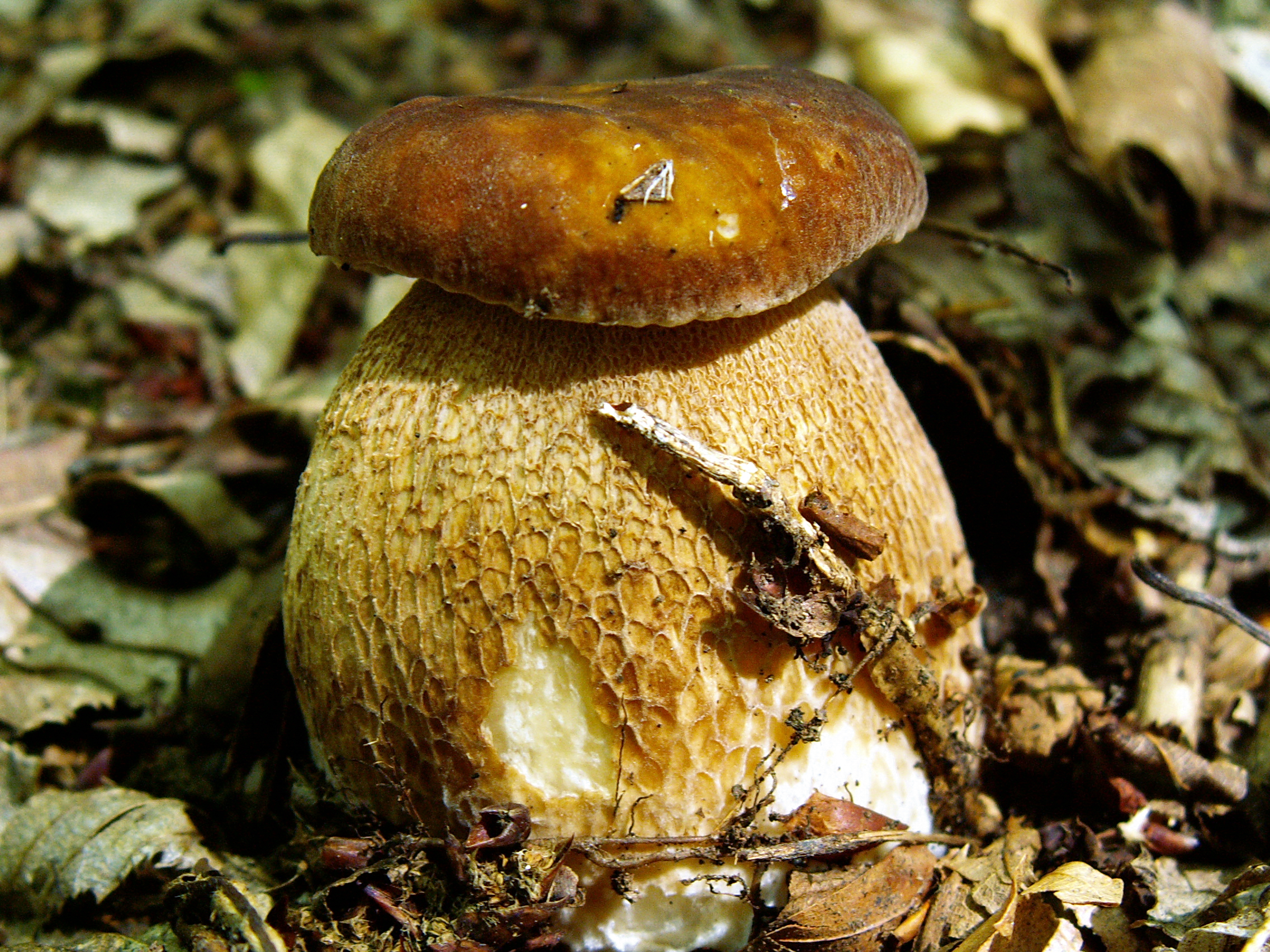
B. reticulatus

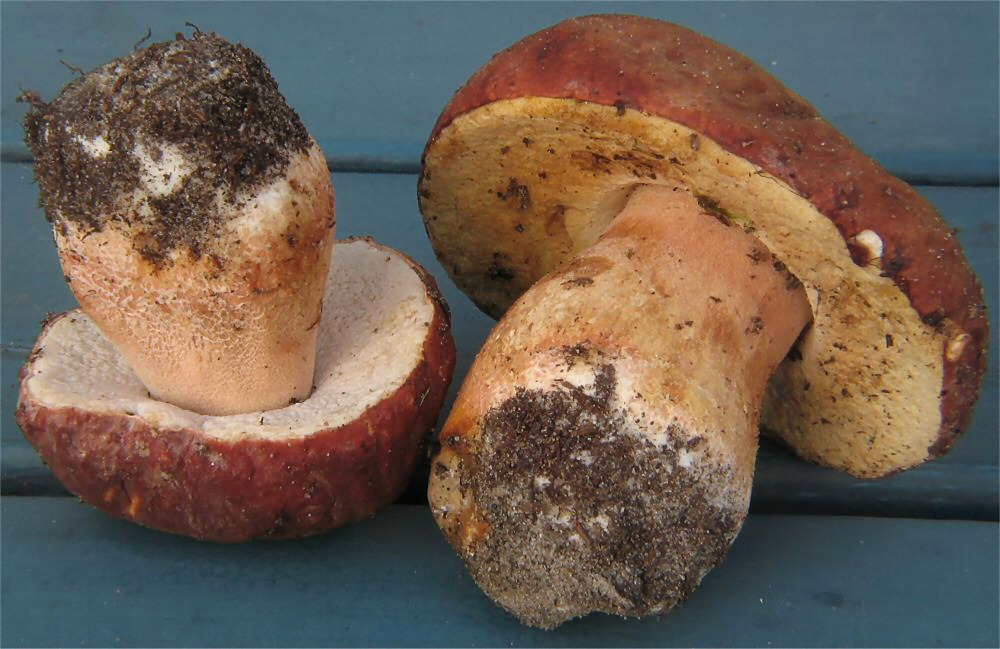
B. pinophilus

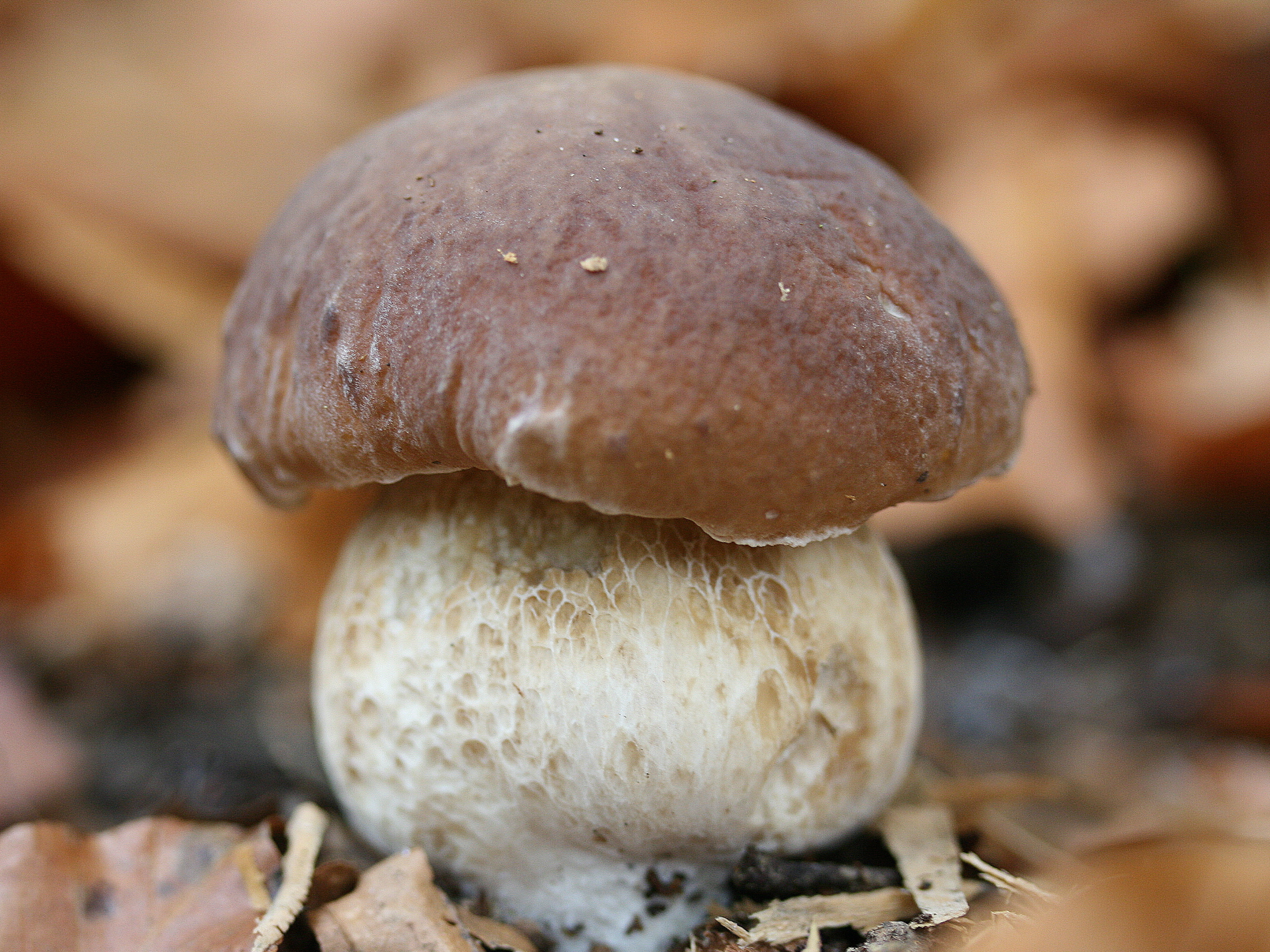
B. edulis

Boletus reticulatus is very similar to B. aereus, also occurring during the summer months under broad-leaved trees. It has a paler, often cracked cap and a usually paler stipe covered in a more elaborate and pronounced whitish reticulation, often extending to the stipe base.

Boletus pinophilus occurs under conifers, mostly Pinus sylvestris, and has a reddish-brown cap. Microscopically, it can be separated by the more inflated, club- to spindle-shaped hyphal ends of the pileipellis.

Boletus edulis occurs later in the season during lower temperatures, mostly under Picea. It has a paler viscid cap, and a paler stipe with an acute white reticulation. Microscopically, it has gelatinised hyphal ends in the pileipellis.

== Distribution and habitat ==
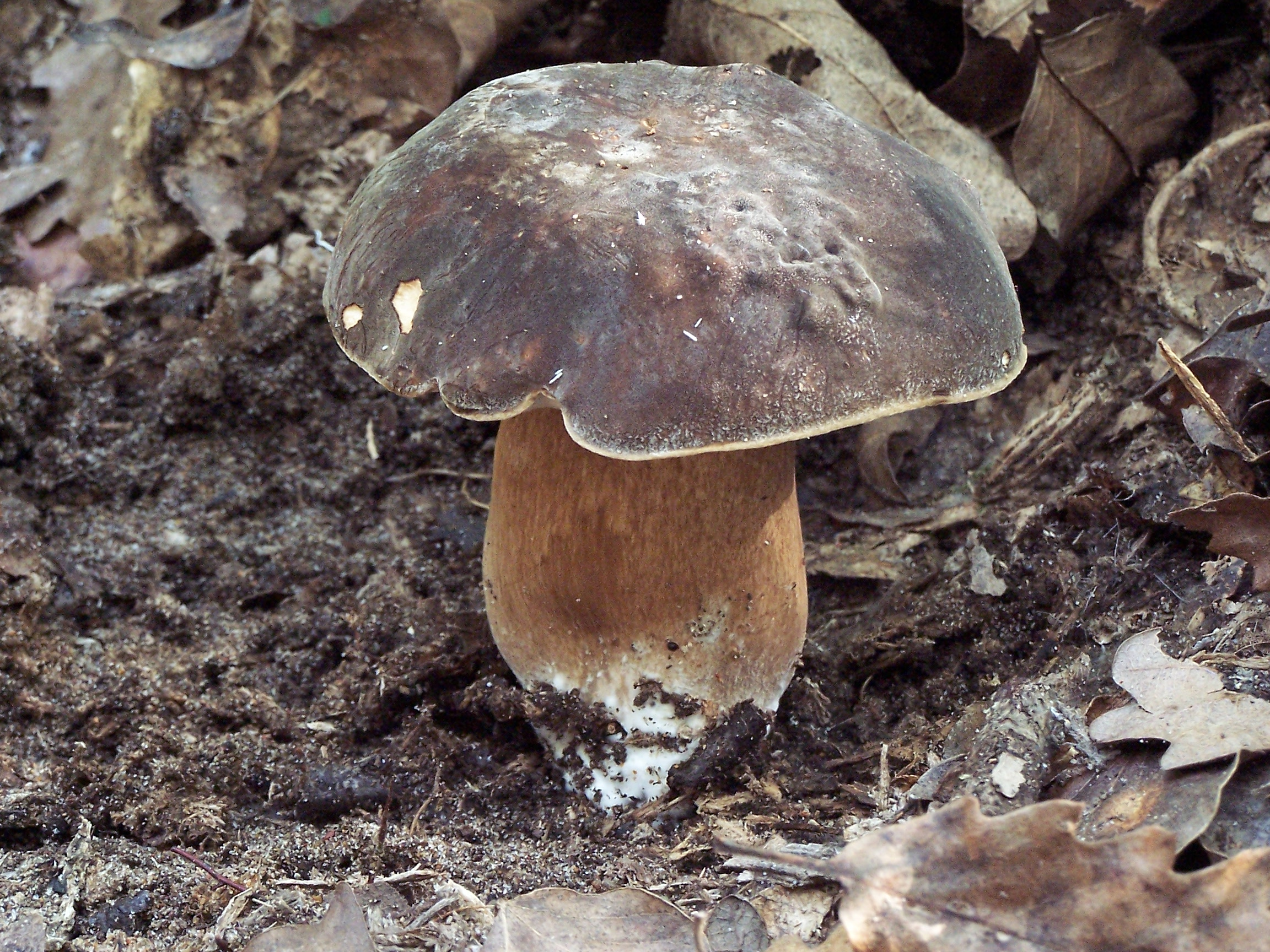
In woodland, Italy

The distribution and abundance of Boletus aereus varies greatly. Found mainly in central and southern Europe as well as north Africa, this species is rare in colder climates such as England. It is classified as a vulnerable species in the Czech Republic and has been placed on a provisional Red List of endangered species of Montenegro. Nevertheless, the fungus can be locally abundant; it is the most common bolete in the woodlands of Madonie Regional Natural Park in northern Sicily. Boletus aereus has been reported from several other island ecosystems across the Mediterranean, such as Corsica, Cyprus, Lesvos, and Naxos.

Mushrooms are mostly found during hot spells in summer and autumn, growing in mycorrhizal association with various broad-leaved trees and sclerophyllous shrubs, especially oak (Quercus), beech (Fagus), chestnut (Castanea), strawberry trees (Arbutus), treeheath (Erica), and rockrose (Cistus), showing a preference for acidic soils. Roadsides and parks are common habitats. The cork oak in particular is an important symbiont, and the distribution of B. aereus aligns with the tree across Europe and North Africa. The ectomycorrhizae that B. aereus forms with sweet chestnut (Castanea sativa) and downy oak (Quercus pubescens) have been described in detail. They are characterized by a lack of hyphal clamps, a plectenchymatous mantle (made of parallel-orientated hyphae with little branching or overlap), and rhizomorphs with differentiated hyphae. A 2007 field study on four species of boletes revealed little correlation between the abundance of fruit bodies and presence of its mycelia below ground, even when soil samples were taken from directly beneath the mushroom; the study concluded that the triggers leading to formation of mycorrhizae and production of the fruit bodies appear to be more complex than previously thought.

In the past the fungus had been reported in China. However, recent molecular studies show that Asian porcini appear to belong to different species.

== Uses ==
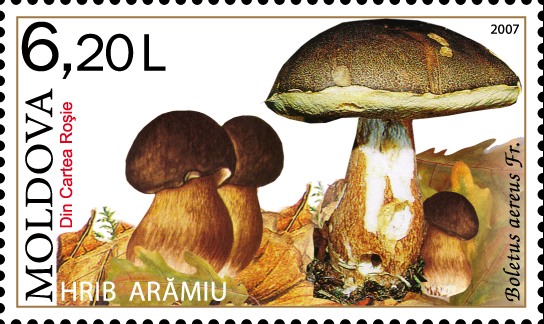
Boletus aereus depicted on a 2007 Moldovan postage stamp

A choice edible species, B. aereus is highly appreciated in Southern Europe for its culinary qualities and is considered by many to be gastronomically superior to B. edulis. In the vicinity of Borgotaro in the Province of Parma of northern Italy, the four species B. edulis, B. aereus, B. reticulatus (formerly known as B. aestivalis), and B. pinophilus have been recognised for their superior taste and officially termed Fungo di Borgotaro. Here, these mushrooms have been collected and exported commercially for centuries. Throughout Spain, it is one of the wild edible fungi most commonly collected for the table, particularly in Aragon, where it is harvested for sale in markets. It is also popular in Navarre, Spain, Basque Country, France, and Greece.

When collected, the skin of the cap is left intact, and dirt is brushed off the surface. Pores are left unless old and soft. Boletus aereus is especially suited for drying, a process which enhances its flavour and aroma. Like other boletes, the mushrooms can be dried by being sliced and strung separately on twine, then hung close to the ceiling of a kitchen. Alternatively, the mushrooms can be dried by cleaning with a brush (washing is not recommended), and then placed in a wicker basket or bamboo steamer on top of a boiler or hot water tank. Once dry, they are kept in an airtight jar. They are easily reconstituted by soaking in hot, but not boiling, water for about twenty minutes; the water is infused with the mushroom aroma and can be used as stock in subsequent cooking. When dried, a small amount of the mushroom can improve the taste of less flavoursome fungi-based dishes.

=== Nutritional value ===
Based on analyses of fruit bodies collected in Portugal, there are 367 kilocalories per 100 grams of bolete (as dry weight). The macronutrient composition of 100 grams of dried bolete includes 17.9 grams of protein, 72.8 grams of carbohydrates, and 0.4 grams of fat. By weight, fresh fruit bodies are about 92% water. The predominant sugar is trehalose (4.7 grams/100 grams dry weight; all following values assume this mass), with lesser amounts of mannitol (1.3 grams). There are 6 grams of tocopherols, the majority of which is gamma-tocopherol (vitamin E), and 3.7 grams of ascorbic acid.
