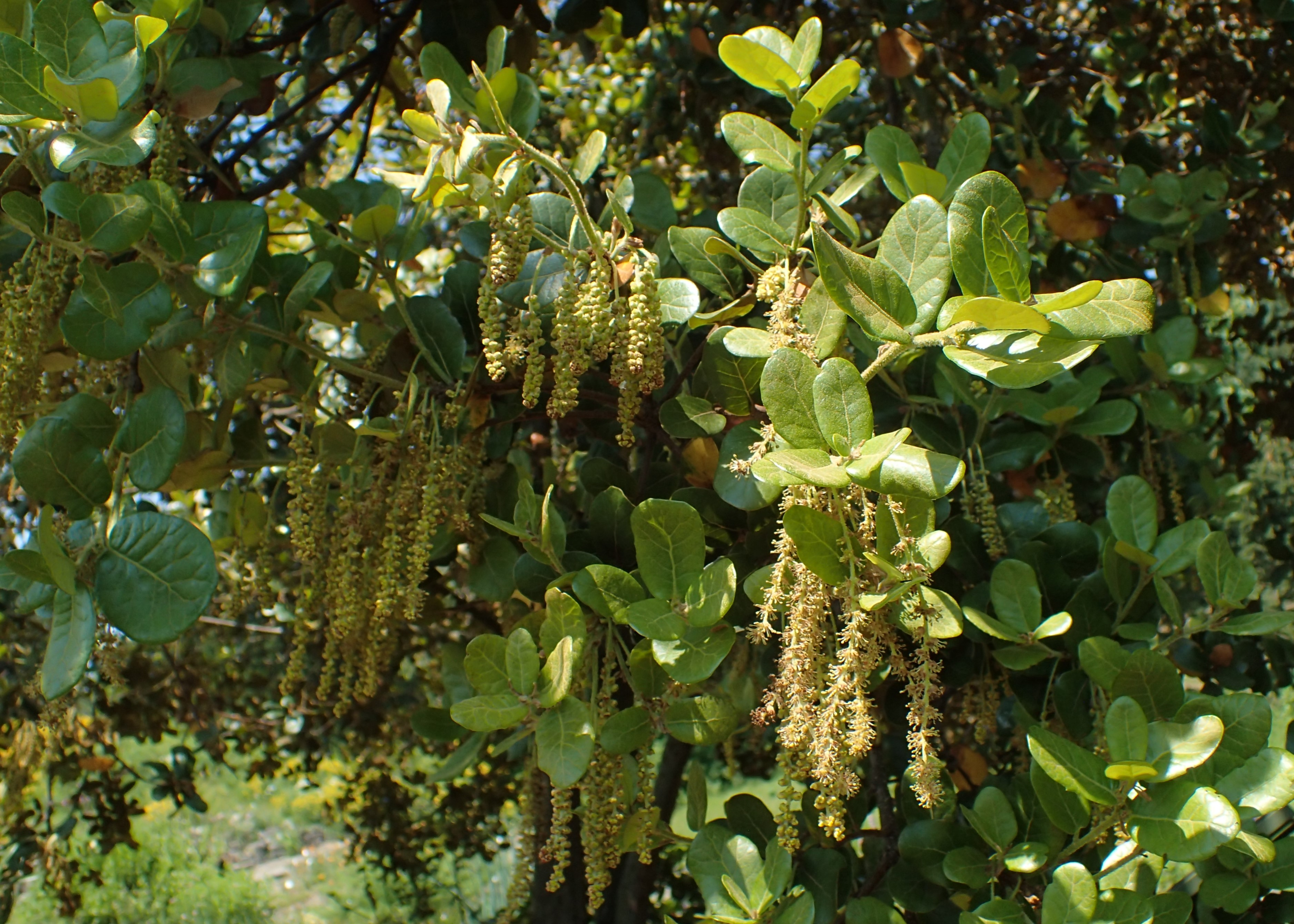

Conservation status
- Least Concern (IUCN 3.1)

Scientific classification
- Kingdom: Plantae
- Clade: Embryophytes
- Clade: Tracheophytes
- Clade: Spermatophytes
- Clade: Angiosperms
- Clade: Eudicots
- Clade: Rosids
- Order: Fagales
- Family: Fagaceae
- Genus: Quercus
- Subgenus: Quercus subg. Cerris
- Section: Quercus sect. Ilex
- Species: Q. aquifolioides

Binomial name
- Quercus aquifolioides Rehder & E.H.Wilson

= Quercus aquifolioides =

Species of tree

Quercus aquifolioides is a species of oak native to south-central China and Tibet. It is in the subgenus Cerris, section Ilex. It is a shrub or small tree adapted to high elevations.
