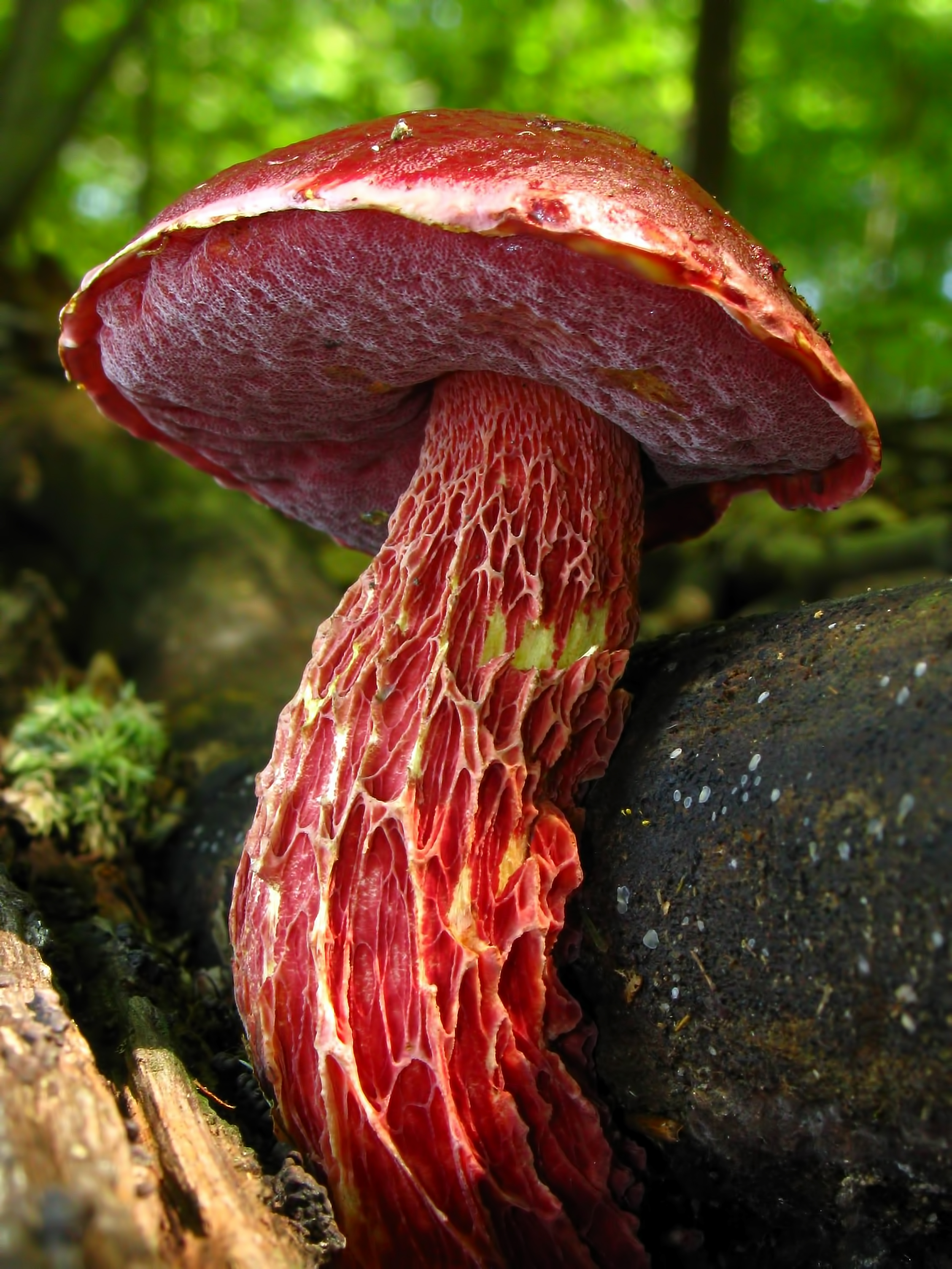

Scientific classification
- Kingdom: Fungi
- Division: Basidiomycota
- Class: Agaricomycetes
- Order: Boletales
- Family: Boletaceae
- Genus: Exsudoporus
- Species: E. frostii

Binomial name
- Exsudoporus frostii (J.L.Russell) Vizzini, Simonini & Gelardi (2014)

Synonyms
- Boletus frostii J.L.Russell (1874); Suillellus frostii (J.L.Russell) Murrill (1909); Tubiporus frostii (J.L.Russell) S.Imai (1968); Butyriboletus frostii (J.L. Russell) G. Wu, Kuan Zhao & Zhu L. Yang (2016)

= Exsudoporus frostii =

Species of fungus found in North America

Exsudoporus frostii
- Mycological characteristics
- Pores on hymenium
- Cap is convex or flat
- Hymenium is adnate
- Stipe is bare
- Spore print is olive-brown
- Ecology is mycorrhizal
- Edibility is edible

Exsudoporus frostii (formerly Boletus frostii), commonly known as Frost's bolete or the apple bolete, is a bolete fungus first described scientifically in 1874. A member of the family Boletaceae, the mushrooms produced by the fungus have tubes and pores instead of gills on the underside of their caps. It can be recognized by its dark red sticky caps, the red pores, the network-like pattern of the stipe, and the bluing reaction to tissue injury. Another characteristic of young, moist fruit bodies is the amber-colored drops exuded on the pore surface.

The species is distributed in the eastern United States from Maine to Georgia, and in the southwest from Arizona extending south to Mexico and Costa Rica. A mycorrhizal species, it is typically found growing near hardwood trees, especially oak.

Although this mushroom is considered edible when thoroughly cooked, it is generally not recommended for consumption because of the risk of confusion with other poisonous red-pored, blue-bruising boletes. B. frostii may be distinguished from other superficially similar red-capped boletes by differences in morphology, bluing reaction, distribution, and/or associated tree species.

== Taxonomy ==
The species was named by the Unitarian minister John Lewis Russell of Salem, Massachusetts, based on specimens found in Brattleboro, Vermont. He named the fungus after his friend, fellow amateur American mycologist Charles Christopher Frost, who published a description of the species in his 1874 survey of the boletes of New England. When the name of a species is contributed by an individual, but the name is formally published by another, the contributor's name can be cited, separated from the publishing author as apud; for this reason, the name and authority are written Boletus Frostii Russell apud Frost in some older literature. Bernard Ogilvie Dodge made reference to B. frostii in 1950 during an address to the Mycological Society of America, in which he spoke about the role of the amateur in discovering new species: "They would have informed us all about the man Russell, who named a fine new bolete for his friend Frost, and about the man Frost, who named a fine new bolete for his friend Russell. Boletus Frostii and Boletus Russellii are mushrooms with character, even though they were described by amateurs." However, in attempting to establish a lectotype specimen, mycologist Roy Halling examined both Russell's original material and his accompanying notes; he concluded that it was Frost who made the original species determinations, further suggesting that "there is no evidence to show that Russell ever collected B. frostii or wrote a description of it."

William Murrill in 1909 placed the species in the genus Suillellus, while Sanshi Imai transferred it to Tubiporus in 1968. Tubiporus has since been synonymized with Boletus. In 1945, Rolf Singer described a bolete he found in Florida; although he originally described it as a subspecies of B. frostii, he later considered the differences between the taxa significant enough to warrant publishing Boletus floridanus as a unique species. Following the molecular studies that outlined a new phylogenetic framework for the Boletaceae, the bolete was transferred to the newly circumscribed genus Exsudoporus in 2014.

Due to lack of sufficient sequences, Wu and colleagues (2016) were reluctant to accept Exsudoporus and considered it a synonym of Butyriboletus, so they transferred E. frostii to the genus Butyriboletus and proposed a new combination Butyriboletus frostii. However, following phylogenetic and morphological analyses clearly resolved Exsudoporus as a monophyletic, homogenous and independent genus that is sister to Butyriboletus.

Exsudoporus frostii is commonly known as "Frost's bolete" or the "apple bolete". In Mexico, its vernacular name is panza agria, which translates to "sour belly".

== Description ==
The shape of the cap of the young fruit body ranges from a half sphere to convex, later becoming broadly convex to flat or shallowly depressed, with a diameter of 5–15 cm (2.0–5.9 in). The edge of the cap is curved inward, although as it ages it can uncurl and turn upward. In moist conditions, the cap surface is sticky as a result of its cuticle, which is made of gelatinized hyphae. If the fruit body has dried out after a rain, the cap is especially shiny, sometimes appearing finely areolate (having a pattern of block-like areas similar to cracked, dried mud). Young mushrooms have a whitish bloom on the cap surface.

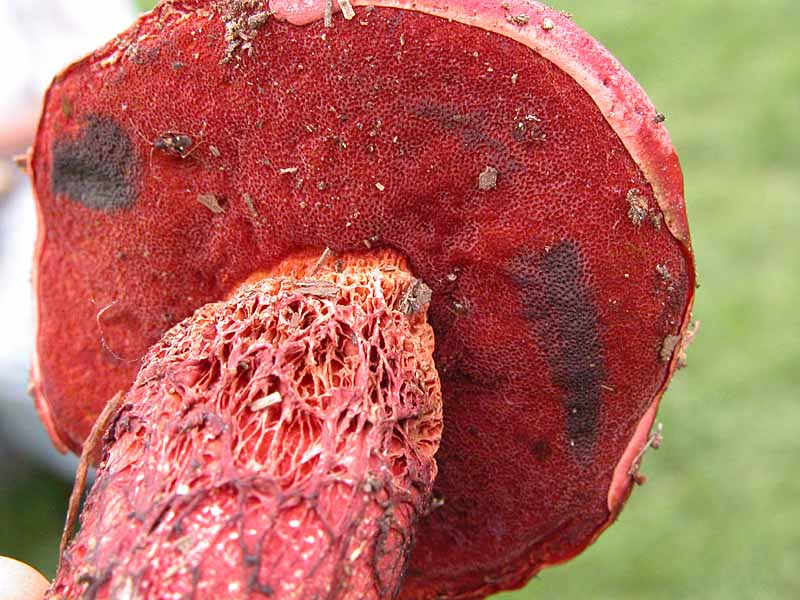
View of the hymenium

The color is bright red initially, but fades with age. The flesh is up to 2.5 cm (1.0 in) thick, and ranges in color from pallid to pale yellow to lemon yellow. The flesh has a variable staining reaction in response to bruising, so some specimens may turn deep blue almost immediately, while others turn blue weakly and slowly. Its taste and odor have been described as pleasant or sweet and somewhat like citrus, although the cuticle may taste acidic.

The tubes comprising the pore surface (the hymenium) are 9–15 mm deep, yellow to olivaceous yellow (mustard yellow), turning dingy blue when bruised. The pores are small (2 to 3 per mm), circular, and until old age a deep red color that eventually becomes paler. The pore surface is often beaded with yellowish droplets when young (a distinguishing characteristic), and readily stains blue when bruised. The stipe is 4 to 12 cm (1.6 to 4.7 in) long, and 1 to 2.5 cm (0.4 to 1.0 in) thick at its apex. It is roughly equal in thickness throughout its length, though it may taper somewhat toward the top; some specimens may appear ventricose (swollen in the middle). The stipe surface is mostly red, or yellowish near the base; it is reticulate—characterized by ridges arranged in the form of a net-like pattern. Mycelia, visible at the base of the stipe, are yellowish white to light yellow.

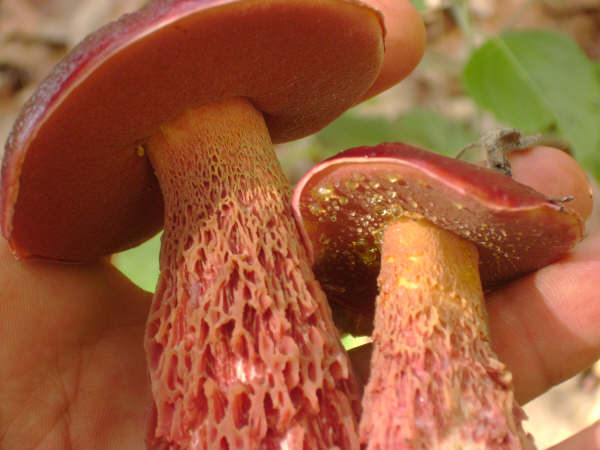
Young fruit bodies may secrete an amber liquid.

The spore print of B. frostii is olive brown. The spores are thick walled, smooth, and spindle shaped, with dimensions of 11–15 by 4–5 μm. Longer spores up to 18 μm long may also be present. The cap cuticle, or pileipellis, is made of a tangled layer of gelatinized hyphae that are 3–6 μm wide. The spore-bearing cells, the basidia, are four spored and measure 26–35 by 10.5–11.5 μm. Cystidia are non-fertile cells interspersed among the basidia, and they are prevalent in the hymenial tissue of E. frostii. These hyaline (translucent) cells measure 30–53 long by 7.5–14 μm wide, and range in shape from somewhat like a spindle (tapering at each end, but with one end typically rounded) to subampullaceous—shaped somewhat like a swollen bottle.

=== Similar species ===
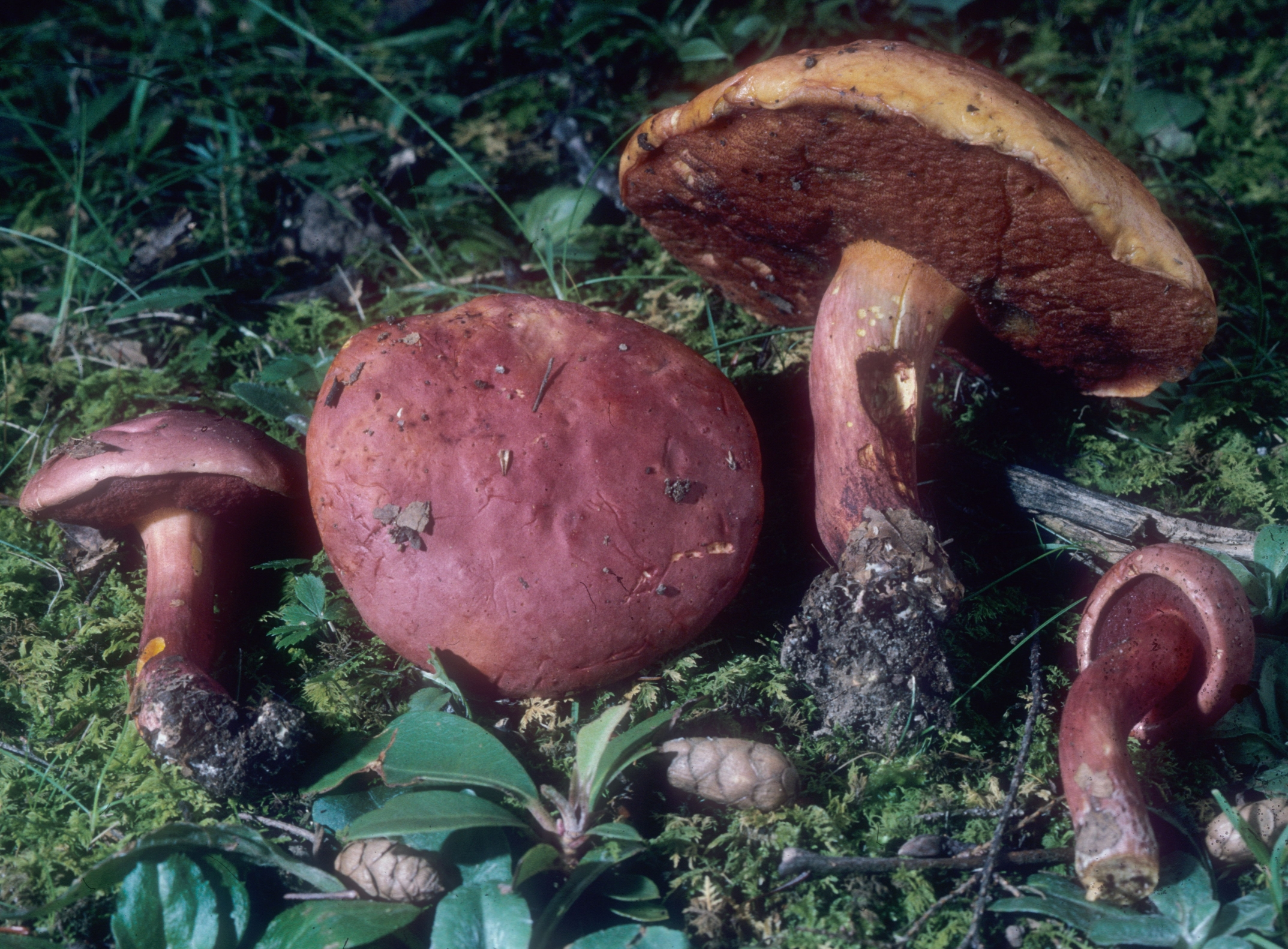
The poisonous Boletus flammans is similar in appearance.

Other red-capped boletes include the poisonous B. flammans and B. rubroflammeus; the former grows most commonly under conifers, the latter in association with hardwoods in eastern North America and southern Arizona. Often confused with Exsudoporus floridanus and E. permagnificus, but the latter species is known only from Europe and Western Asia and always grow in association with oaks and occasionally also with sweet chestnut. Exsudoporus floridanus differs from E. frostii in having a lighter cap color and in the texture of the cap surface: it is tomentose (covered with dense, short, soft, matted hairs) or velutinous (like velvet), compared to the relatively smooth surface of E. frostii. Singer notes that although the physical characteristics between the two taxa may be blurred and are hard to define, the area of origin can reliably distinguish them: E. floridanus is found on shaded lawns and scrubland in open oak stands in non-tropical regions of Florida, typically on grassy or sandy soil, where it fruits between May and October.

The fruit bodies of young specimens of B. kermesinus, newly described from Japan in 2011, are similar in appearance to E. frostii. In addition to its distribution, B. kermesinus can be distinguished from E. frostii by having flesh that does not bruise blue and a stipe in which the reticulum is not as deep and coarse. B. pseudofrostii, found in Belize, produces smaller caps that are 1.7 to 2.0 cm (0.7 to 0.8 in) in diameter. Boletus russelli, found in eastern North America, has a red to reddish-brown cap and reticulate stipe, but its pore surface is yellow, and the fruit body does not bruise blue.

== Habitat and distribution ==
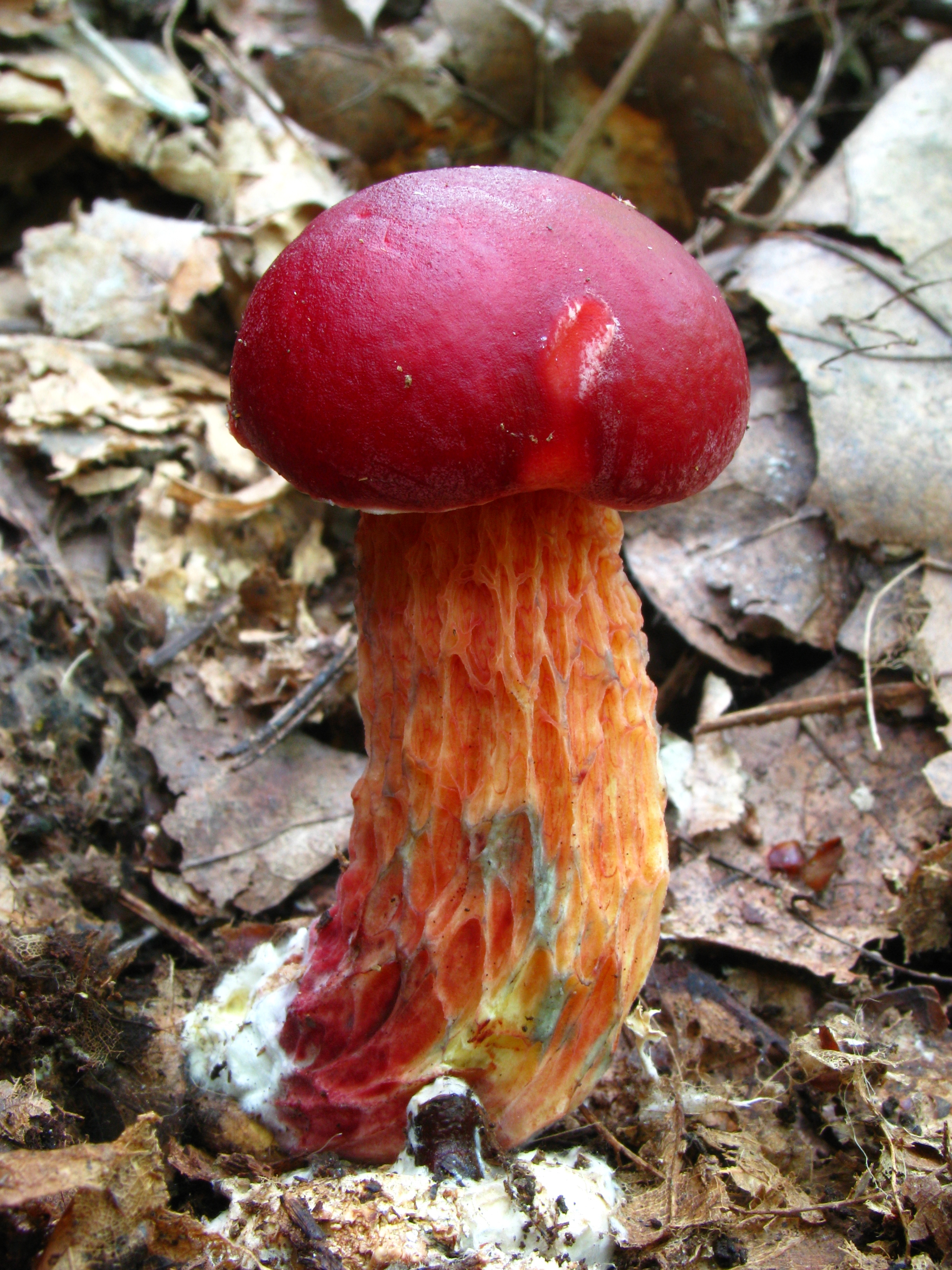
Immature specimen with cap not fully expanded; bruising is evident on the stipe.

Exsudoporus frostii is a mycorrhizal species, meaning that the fungus forms associations with the roots of various species of trees. The fruit bodies grow solitarily, scattered, or in groups on the ground under hardwood trees. The fungus fruits in summer to early autumn. William Murrill noted its preference for growing in "thin oak woods, where the light is sufficient to enable grass to grow", and Alexander H. Smith mentioned its preference for growing in "thin, sandy soil under scrub oak". It can be found from June to September in eastern North America. In the United States, it is distributed from Maine south to Georgia, extending west to Tennessee and Michigan, and in southern Arizona. In Mexico, it is often found under Madrone. It has also been collected in Costa Rica, where it associates with the oak species Quercus copeyensis, Q. costaricensis, Q. rapurahuensis, and Q. seemanii. A 1980 publication tentatively suggested that the fungus was also present in Italy, but the author later determined that the putative E. frostii was actually Boletus siculus (now synonymized into E. permagnificus).

== Ecology ==
The mycorrhizal associations are mutualistic, because the fungus absorbs mineral nutrients from the soil and channels these into the plant, while the plant provides the fungus with sugars, a product of photosynthesis. The characteristic feature of the mycorrhiza is the presence of a sheath of fungal tissue that encases the terminal, nutrient-absorbing rootlets of the host plant. The fungus forms an extensive underground network of hyphae that radiate outward from the surface of the root sheath, effectively increasing the surface area for nutrient absorption. The hyphae also invade between the root cortical cells to form a Hartig net. Using pure culture techniques, Exsudoporus frostii has been shown to form mycorrhizae with Virginia pine (Pinus virginiana), while a field study confirms a similar association with the oak Quercus laurina.

The fruit bodies can be parasitized by the mold-like fungus Sepedonium ampullosporum. Infection results in necrosis of the mushroom tissue and a yellow color caused by the formation of large amounts of pigmented aleurioconidia (single-celled conidia produced by extrusion from the conidiophores).

== Edibility ==
This species is nonpoisonous. Murrill wrote in 1910 of its edibility: "Usually viewed with suspicion because of its red hymenium, but its properties are not accurately known." Since then, several authors have advised against consuming the species, due to its resemblance to other toxic red-capped boletes. In his 100 Edible Mushrooms (2007), Michael Kuo notes that although the mushroom is apparently edible for some, it "affects others negatively". David Arora mentions that it is commonly sold in rural markets in Mexico; a 1997 study suggests that it is only consumed in rural areas of Querétaro.

Chemical analysis of fresh fruit bodies collected in Mexico showed them to have the following composition: moisture 94.53%; ash 0.323%; dietary fiber 3.024%; fat 0.368%; and protein 1.581%. The free fatty acid content of dried fruit bodies was 4.5%, slightly more than the common button mushroom (Agaricus bisporus), which had 3.5%. The majority of this total was oleic acid (1.95%), followed by linoleic acid (1.68%) and palmitic acid (1.69%).

== See also ==
- List of North American boletes
