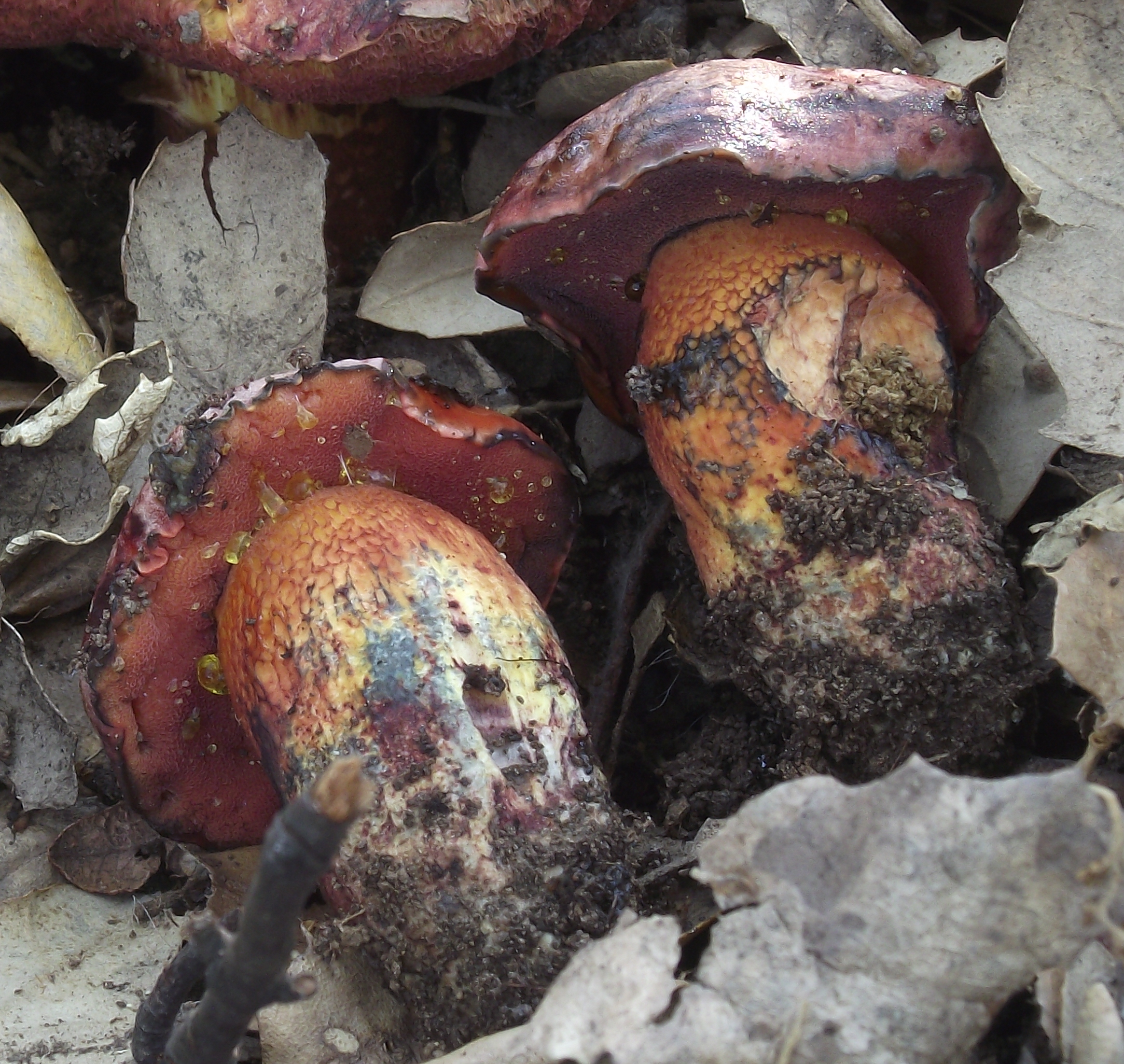
- Exsudoporus permagnificus

Scientific classification
- Kingdom: Fungi
- Division: Basidiomycota
- Class: Agaricomycetes
- Order: Boletales
- Family: Boletaceae
- Genus: Exsudoporus; Vizzini, Simonini & Gelardi (2014)

Type species
- Exsudoporus permagnificus (Pöder) Vizzini, Simonini & Gelardi (2014)

Species
- Exsudoporus floridanus Exsudoporus frostii Exsudoporus permagnificus Exsudoporus ruber

= Exsudoporus =

Genus of fungi

Exsudoporus is a genus of fungi in the family Boletaceae. It was circumscribed in 2014 by Alfredo Vizzini and colleagues, following a number of molecular studies that outlined a new phylogenetic framework for Boletaceae and revealed the genus Boletus in its traditional circumscription to be polyphyletic. However, due to lack of sufficient sequences, Wu and colleagues (2016) were reluctant to accept the newly proposed genus and considered it a synonym of Butyriboletus. Following additional phylogenetic sequencing and morphological analyses, Exsudoporus was clearly resolved as a monophyletic, homogenous and independent genus that is sister to Butyriboletus.

Species of Exsudoporus are united by the tendency of their pores to exude yellowish droplets, hence the generic epithet. Other distinctive features separating Exsudoporus from its sister-genus Butyriboletus, include the reddish-orange colour of their pores and the distinctly elongated, often 'sculpted' (raised) reticulation on the stipe.

== Species ==
The genus currently accommodates four species:

Image	Scientific name	Taxon author	Year	Distribution
	Exsudoporus permagnificus	(Pöder 1981) Vizzini, Simonini & Gelardi	2014	native to Europe and West Asia
	Exsudoporus ruber	(M. Zang) Gelardi, Biketova and Vizzini	2022	native to East Asia
	Exsudoporus floridanus	(Singer 1945) Vizzini, Simonini & Gelardi	2014	North America.
	Exsudoporus frostii	(J.L. Russell 1874) Vizzini, Simonini & Gelardi	2014	North America.
