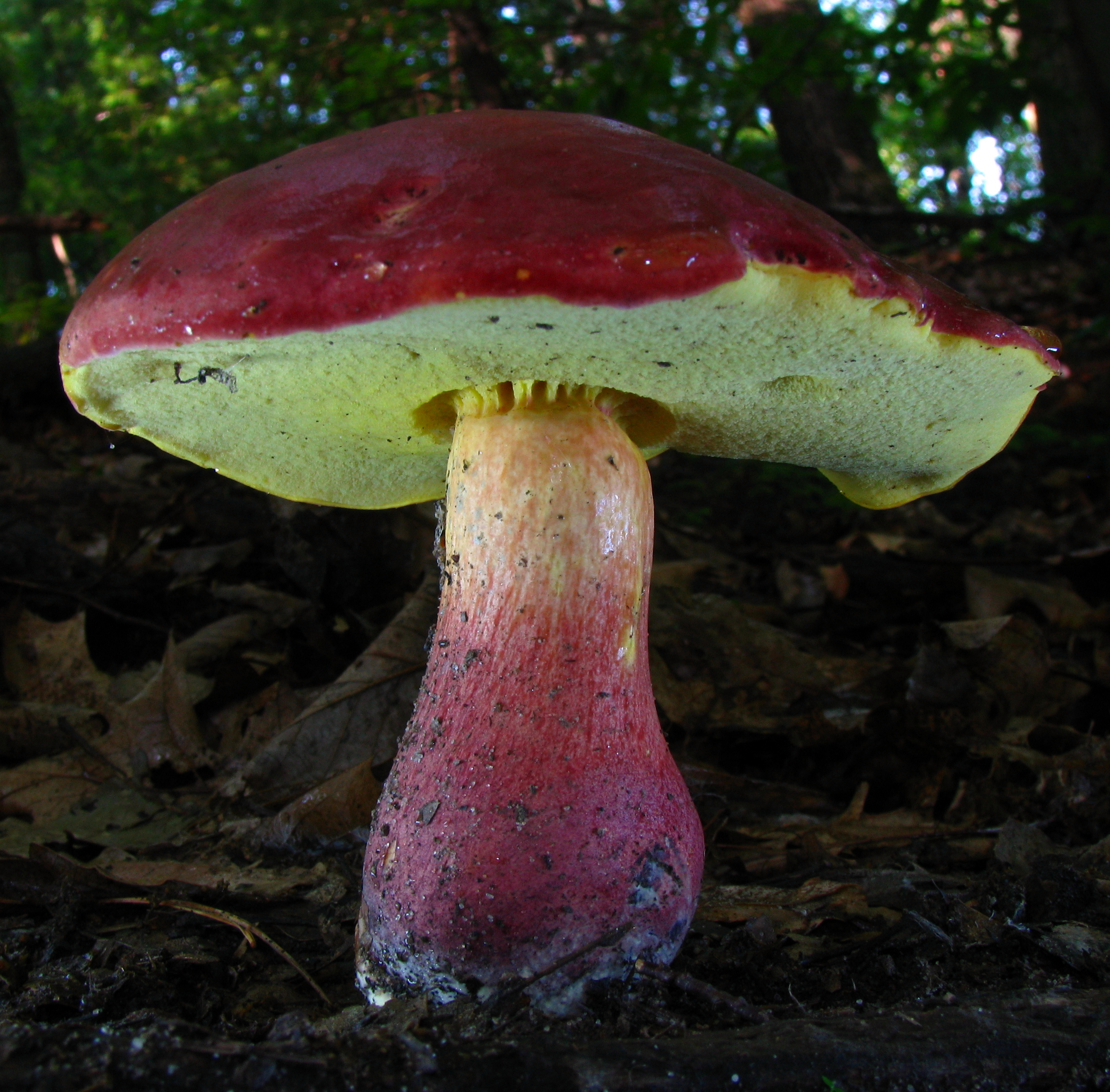
- Baorangia bicolor

Scientific classification
- Kingdom: Fungi
- Division: Basidiomycota
- Class: Agaricomycetes
- Order: Boletales
- Family: Boletaceae
- Genus: Baorangia; G.Wu & Zhu L.Yang (2015)

Type species
- Baorangia pseudocalopus (Hongo) G.Wu & Zhu L.Yang (2015)

Species
- B. bicolor B. emileorum B. pseudocalopus

= Baorangia =

Genus of fungi

Baorangia is a fungal genus in the family Boletaceae. It was circumscribed by Chinese mycologists Gang Wu and Zhu L. Yang in 2015 with B. pseudocalopus (formerly classified in Boletus) as the type species. Baorangia emilei and B. bicolor were transferred to the genus from Boletus that same year. The erection of Baorangia follows recent molecular studies that outlined a new phylogenetic framework for the Boletaceae. The generic name—derived from the Chinese words bao ("thin") and rang ("hymenium")—refers to the characteristically thin hymenophore, which distinguishes it from all other Boletaceae genera.

== Species ==
Image	Scientific name	Taxon author	Distribution
	Baorangia bicolor	(Kuntze) G. Wu, Halling & Zhu L. Yang, 2015	Southeastern Canada and the Great Lakes Region, primarily east of the Rocky Mountains, as far south as the Florida peninsula, and out to the Midwest as far as Wisconsin, China and Nepal
	Baorangia emileorum	(Barbier) Vizzini, Simonini & Gelardi 2015	Italy, Spain, Portugal, Greece, Macedonia, and Croatia
	Baorangia pseudocalopus	(Hongo) G. Wu & Zhu L. Yang, 2015	China and Japan
