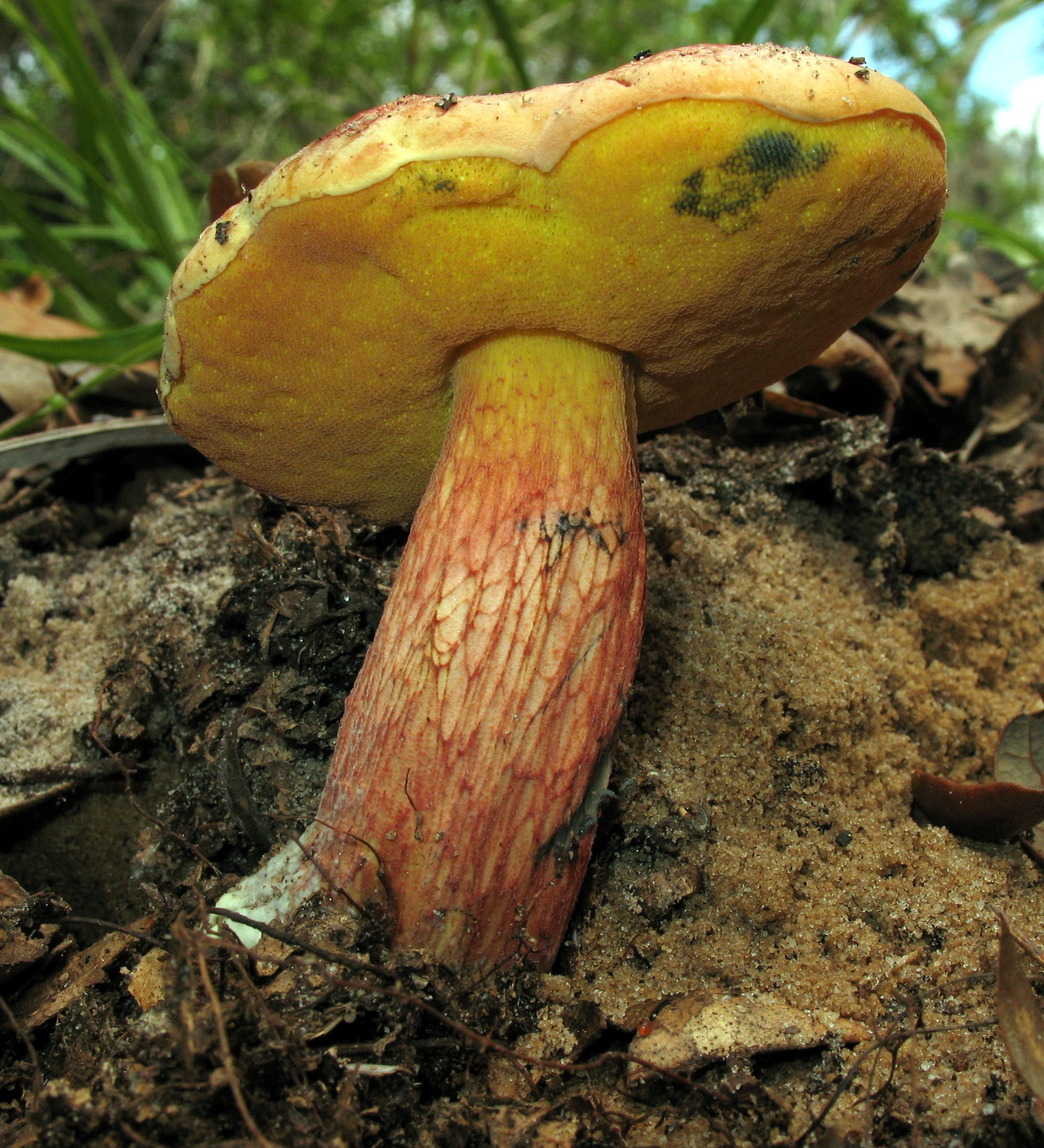

Scientific classification
- Domain: Eukaryota
- Kingdom: Fungi
- Division: Basidiomycota
- Class: Agaricomycetes
- Order: Boletales
- Family: Boletaceae
- Genus: Exsudoporus
- Species: E. floridanus

Binomial name
- Exsudoporus floridanus (Singer) Vizzini, Simonini & Gelardi (2014)

Synonyms
- Boletus frostii subsp. floridanus Singer (1945); Boletus floridanus (Singer) Murrill (1948); Suillellus floridanus (Singer) Murrill (1948); Butyriboletus floridanus (Singer) G. Wu, Kuan Zhao & Zhu L. Yang (2016); Exsudoporus floridanus (Singer) G. Wu, Kuan Zhao & Zhu L. Yang (2016)

= Exsudoporus floridanus =

Species of fungus

Exsudoporus floridanus Mycological characteristics
- Pores on hymenium
- Cap is convex or flat
- Hymenium is adnate
- Stipe is bare
- Spore print is olive-brown
- Ecology is mycorrhizal
- Edibility is edible

Exsudoporus floridanus is a species of edible bolete mushroom in the family Boletaceae. In 1945, American mycologist Rolf Singer described a species he found in Florida during his 1942–3 tenure of a Guggenheim Memorial Fellowship. He originally described it as a subspecies of the eastern North American species Boletus frostii, but later considered it worthy of distinct species status in a 1947 publication. Based on morphological and phylogenetic data, Vizzini and colleagues transferred this species to a newly described genus Exsudoporus in 2014. Due to lack of sufficient sequences, Wu et al. (2016) were reluctant to accept Exsudoporus and considered it a synonym of Butyriboletus, so they proposed a new combination Butyriboletus floridanus. However, following phylogenetic and morphological analyses clearly resolved Exsudoporus as a monophyletic, homogenous and independent genus that is sister to Butyriboletus.

Exsudoporus floridanus differs from Exsudoporus frostii in having a lighter cap color and in the texture of the cap surface: the subspecies is tomentose (covered with dense, short, soft, matted hairs) or velutinous (like velvet), compared to the relatively smooth surface of E. frostii. Singer notes that although the physical characteristics between the two taxa may be blurred and are hard to define, the area of origin is a reliable indicator of subspecies status. E. floridanus is found on shaded lawns and scrubland in open oak stands in non-tropical regions of Florida, typically on grassy or sandy soil. It grows under or near several oak species, including Chapman oak (Quercus chapmanii), swamp laurel oak (Q. laurifolia), and southern live oak (Q. virginiana), and it fruits between May and October.

== Edibility ==
Exsudoporus floridanus is said to be edible but bitter, tasting slightly acidic, akin to lemons. It is known to cause gastric upset in some who consume it.

== See also ==
- List of North American boletes
