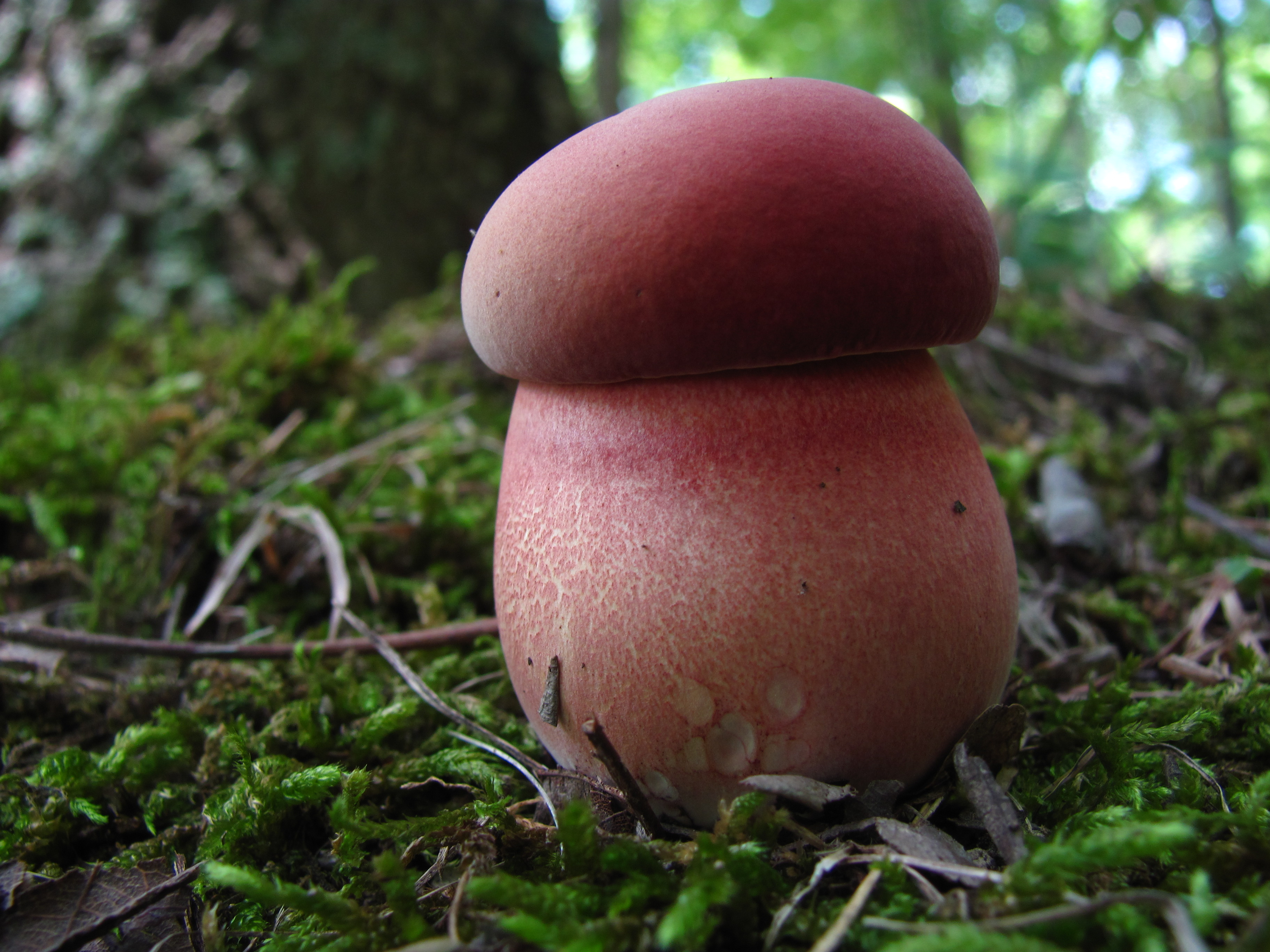
- Young fruit body

Scientific classification
- Domain: Eukaryota
- Kingdom: Fungi
- Division: Basidiomycota
- Class: Agaricomycetes
- Order: Boletales
- Family: Boletaceae
- Genus: Boletus
- Species: B. sensibilis

Binomial name
- Boletus sensibilis Peck

= Boletus sensibilis =

Species of fungus

Boletus sensibilis Mycological characteristics
- Pores on hymenium
- Cap is convex
- Hymenium is adnate
- Stipe is bare
- Spore print is olive-brown
- Ecology is mycorrhizal
- Edibility is poisonous

Boletus sensibilis is a species of fungus in the family Boletaceae. The species was first described scientifically by American mycologist Charles Horton Peck in 1879. This species is very similar to two other red boletes, Baorangia bicolor and Boletus pseudosensibilis.

== Description ==
This vibrant mushroom has a stipe (stem) around 5–13 cm (2.0–5.1 in) long, and 2–3.5 cm (0.79–1.38 in) thick. The stipe is nearly round and has a classic club shape. Its convex cap measures 5–12 centimetres (2.0–4.7 in) across and broadens with age. The cap is dirty pinkish red when young, fading to a reddish cinnamon when old. Perhaps the most characteristic trait of this mushroom is its near instantaneous blue staining when handled, which led to the species' name sensibilis, adapted from the Latin word for sensitive. Some describe the smell of the mushroom as "curry-like", although descriptions of this smell vary. Michael Kuo commented that the "curry-like" odor is not a distinguishing feature for Boletus sensibilis, as many Baorangia bicolor collections have a similar smell.

The mushroom is mycorrhizal with hardwoods, and can often be seen growing near oaks or beech in the fall and summer east of the Rocky Mountains. The spore print is greyish olive.

While it is commonly labeled as poisonous, some reputable sources such as mycoquebec.org considers it as a choice edible, labeling it as "Très bon comestible". Nevertheless, it remains one of the less well tolerated mushrooms. Any consumption of this mushroom should be preceded by boiling for an extended period of at least 15 min to at least 95 C during the whole period.

== See also ==
- List of Boletus species
- List of North American boletes
