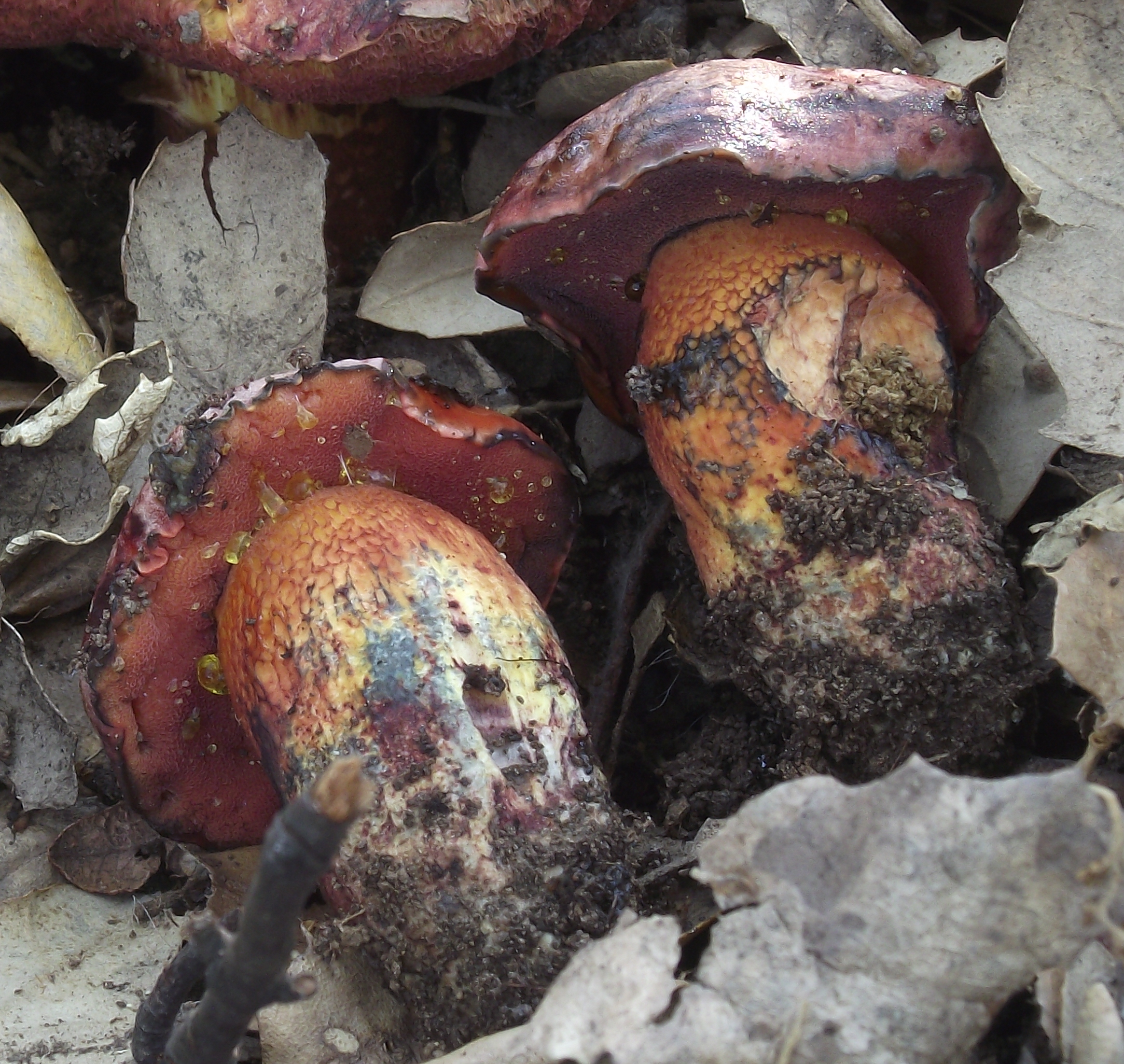

Scientific classification
- Kingdom: Fungi
- Division: Basidiomycota
- Class: Agaricomycetes
- Order: Boletales
- Family: Boletaceae
- Genus: Exsudoporus
- Species: E. permagnificus

Binomial name
- Exsudoporus permagnificus Pöder (1981)

Synonyms
- Boletus permagnificus Pöder (1981); Boletus siculus Inzenga, 1869

= Exsudoporus permagnificus =

Species of fungus

Exsudoporus permagnificus is a species of bolete fungus in the family Boletaceae, native to Southern Europe and Western Asia (Cyprus and Israel). Described as new to science in 1981, the fungus was originally placed in genus Boletus. Following molecular studies outlining a new phylogenetic framework for Boletaceae, the fungus was transferred to the newly erected genus Exsudoporus in 2014, to which it is the type species. Nevertheless, Wu and colleagues (2016) were reluctant to accept the newly proposed genus due to a lack of sufficient sequences and regarded it a synonym of Butyriboletus. Following studies reinstated the status of Exsudoporus as a monophyletic genus sister to Butyriboletus, following additional collections and extended phylogenetic and morphological analyses.

Exsudoporus permagnificus is rare throughout its distribution area and listed as a vulnerable or endangered species in a number of regional and national checklists. It forms ectomycorrhizal associations with oaks (Quercus), particularly Quercus suber, Quercus ilex, Quercus pubescens, Quercus alnifolia, Quercus calliprinos, Quercus pyrenaica and less often with sweet chestnut (Castanea sativa).
