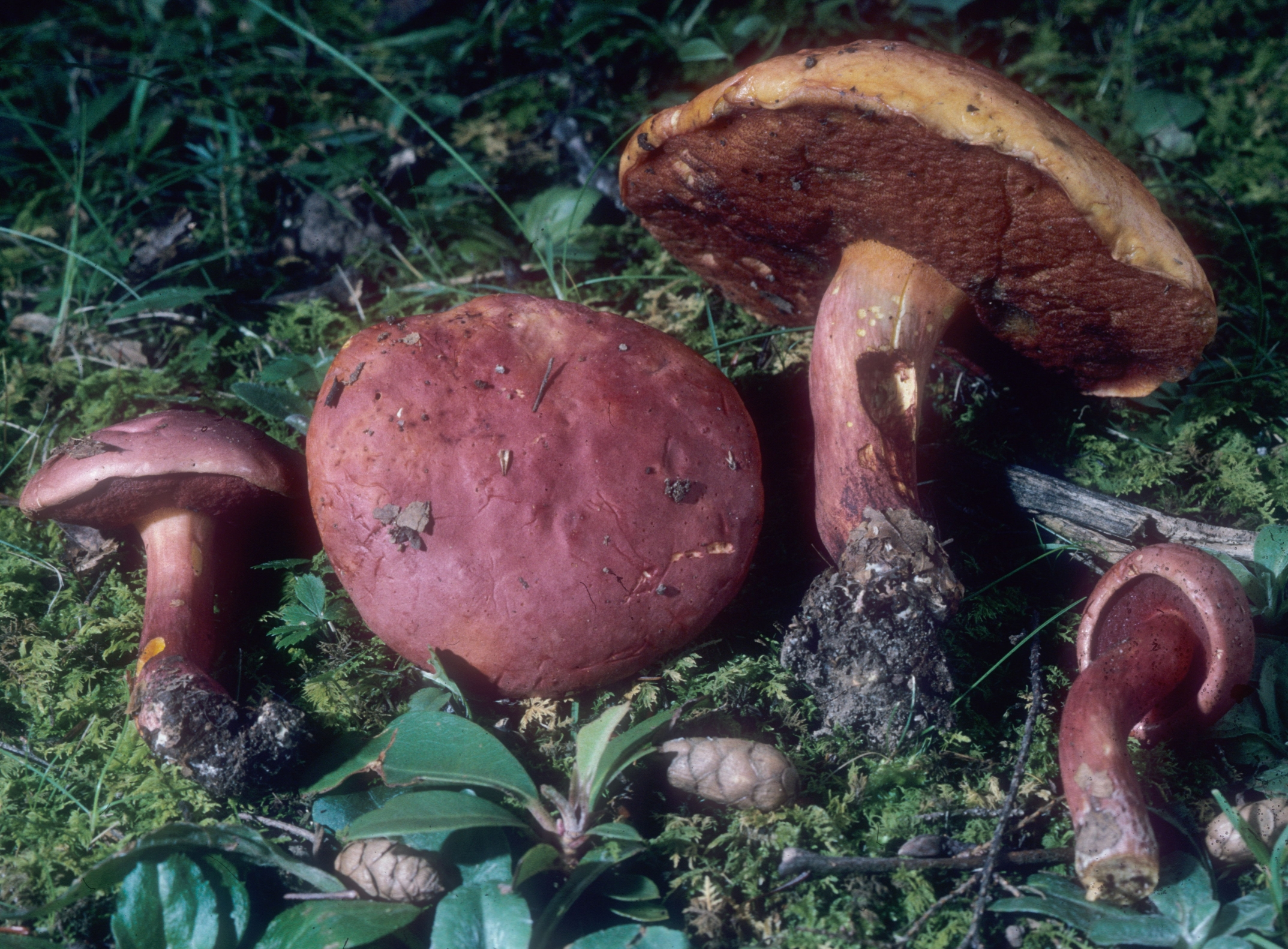

Scientific classification
- Domain: Eukaryota
- Kingdom: Fungi
- Division: Basidiomycota
- Class: Agaricomycetes
- Order: Boletales
- Family: Boletaceae
- Genus: Boletus
- Species: B. flammans

Binomial name
- Boletus flammans E.A.Dick & Snell (1965)

= Boletus flammans =

Species of fungus

Boletus flammans is a species of bolete fungus found in North America. It was described scientifically by Esther A. Dick and Wally Snell in 1965. As of 2011, its edibility remained unknown.

== See also ==
- List of Boletus species
- List of North American boletes
