= List of Leccinum species =

This is a list of species in the genus Leccinum. As of November 2023, Index Fungorum accepts 132 species in the genus Leccinum. A B C D E F G H I J K L M N O P Q R S T U V U W X Y Z

== A ==
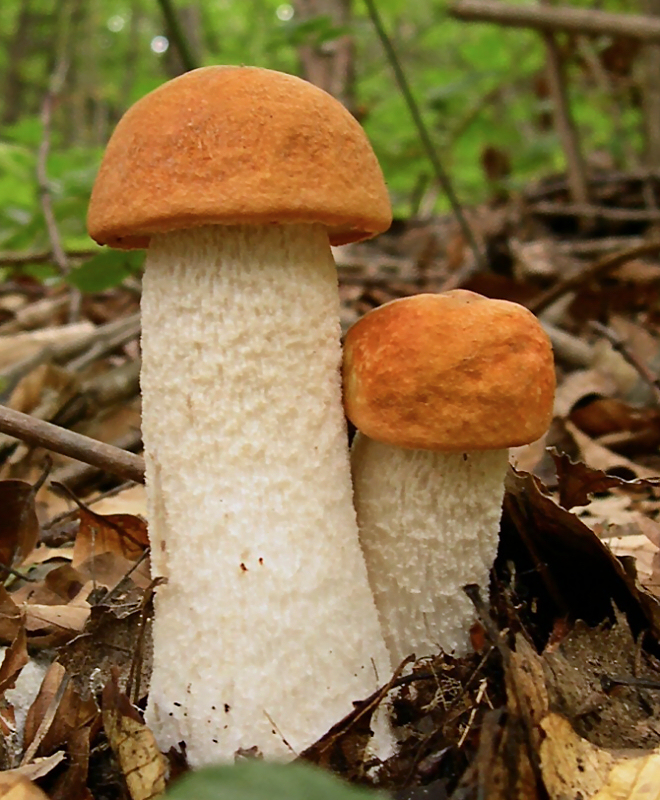
Leccinum albostipitatum den Bakker & Noordel. 2005

- Leccinum aberrans Sm. & Thiers 1971 – United States
- Leccinum aeneum Halling 1977 – United States
- Leccinum alaskanum V.L.Wells & Kempton 1975 – Alaska, United States
- Leccinum alboroseolum (J.Blum) Lannoy & Estadès 1994
- Leccinum albostipitatum den Bakker & Noordel. 2005 – Europe
- Leccinum album X. Meng, Yan C. Li & Zhu L. Yang 2021
- Leccinum ambiguum A.H.Sm. & Thiers 1971 – United States
- Leccinum angustisporum A.H.Sm., Thiers & Watling 1967 – United States
- Leccinum arbuticola Thiers 1975
- Leccinum arctoi Vassilkov 1978 – Russian Far East
- Leccinum arctostaphyli V.L.Wells & Kempton 1967 – Alaska, United States
- Leccinum arenicola Redhead & Watling 1979 – Canada
- Leccinum areolatum A.H.Sm. & Thiers 1971 – United States
- Leccinum armeniacum Thiers 1971 – United States
- Leccinum aurantiacum (Bull.) Gray 1821
- Leccinum aurantiellum E.A.Dick & Snell 1969

== B ==
- Leccinum barrowsii A.H.Sm., Thiers & Watling 1966 – North America
- Leccinum boreale A.H.Sm., Thiers & Watling 1966 – North America
- Leccinum borneense (Corner) E. Horak 2011
- Leccinum broughii A.H.Sm. & Thiers 1971 – United States
- Leccinum brunneo-olivaceum Snell, E.A.Dick & Hesler 1951
- Leccinum brunneum Thiers 1971 – United States

== C ==
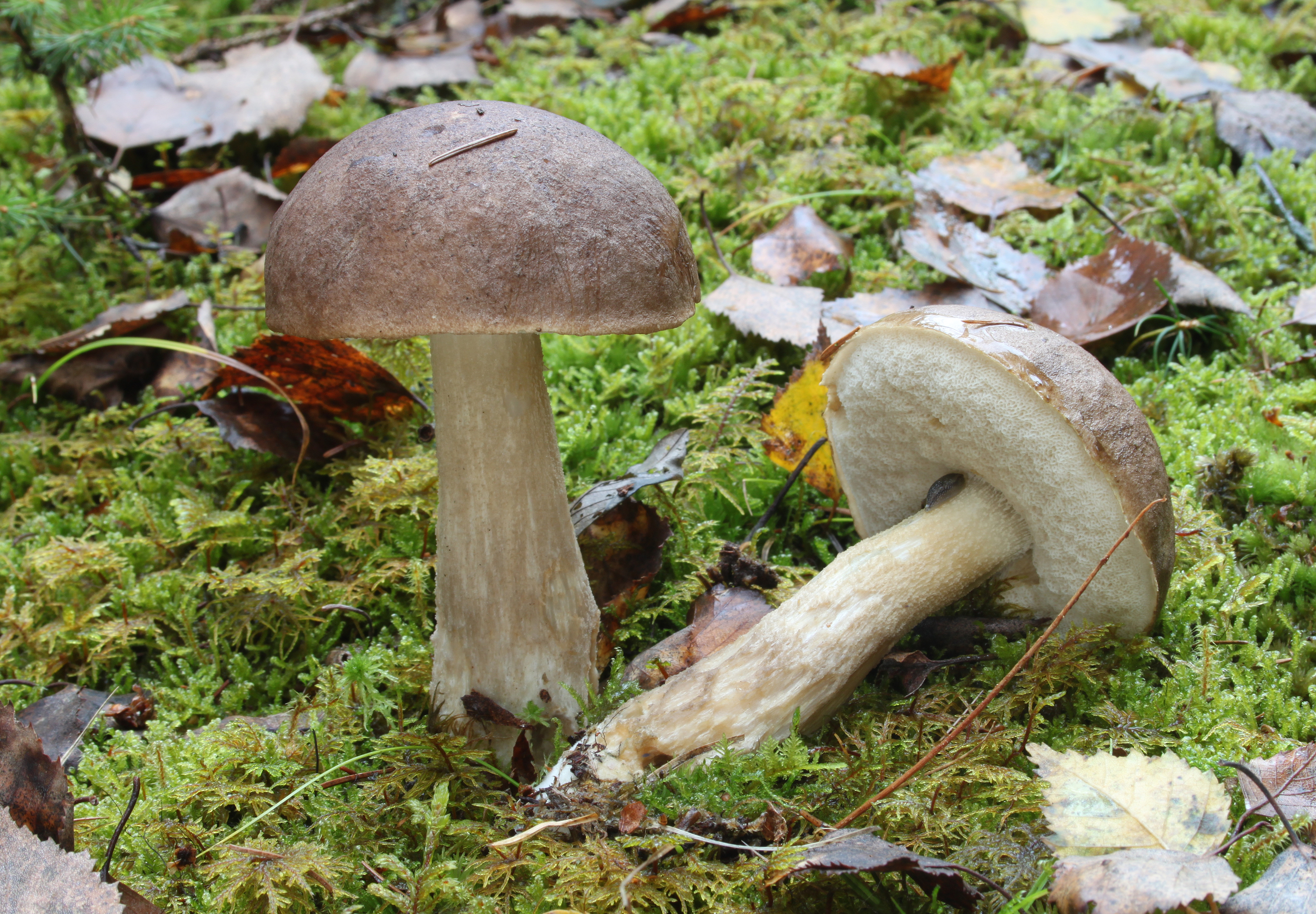
Leccinum cyaneobasileucum Lannoy & Estadès 1991

- Leccinum californicum Thiers 1971 – United States
- Leccinum callitrichum Redeuilh 1995 – Europe
- Leccinum cerinum M.Korhonen 1995 – Fennoscandia
- Leccinum chalybaeum Singer 1945 – Fennoscandia
- Leccinum chioneum (Fr. 1818) Redeuilh 1990
- Leccinum cinnamomeum A.H.Sm., Thiers & Watling 1966 – North America
- Leccinum clavatum A.H.Sm., Thiers & Watling 1966 – North America
- Leccinum coloripes (J.Blum 1970) Lannoy & Estadès 1993
- Leccinum colubrinum A.H.Sm., Thiers & Watling 1968
- Leccinum constans Thiers 1975
- Leccinum crocistipidosum H. Engel & Dermek 1981
- Leccinum cyaneobasileucum Lannoy & Estadès 1991

== D ==
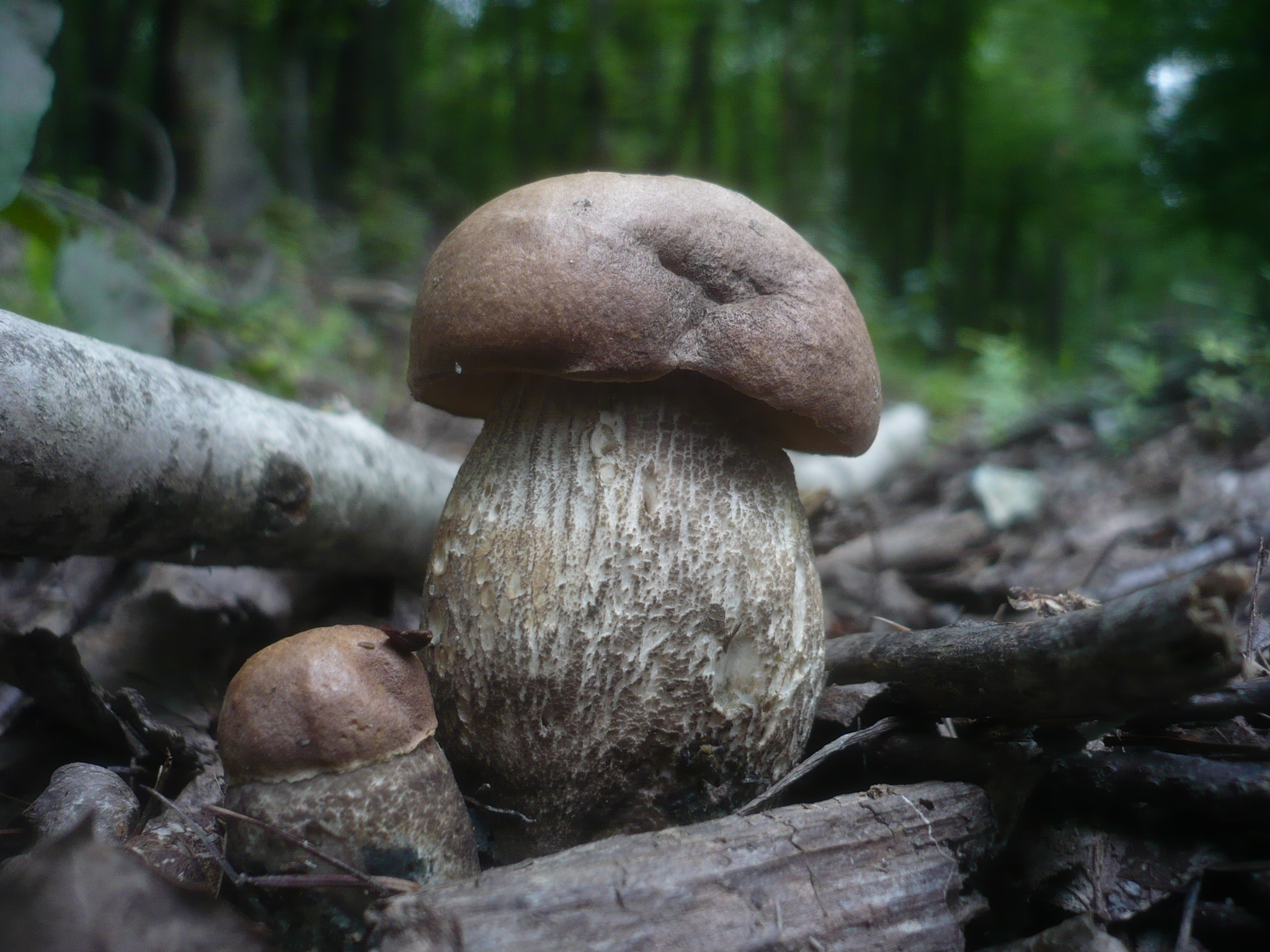
Leccinum duriusculum (Schulzer ex Kalchbr. 1874) Singer 1947

- Leccinum disarticulatum A.H.Sm. & Thiers 1971 – United States
- Leccinum discolor A.H.Sm., Thiers & Watling 1966 – North America
- Leccinum duriusculum (Schulzer 1874 ex Kalchbr. 1874) Singer 1947

== E ==
- Leccinum engelianum Klofac 2007 – Europe
- Leccinum excedens (Heinem. & Gooss.-Font. 1951) Heinem. 1966

== F ==
- Leccinum fallax A.H.Sm., Thiers & Watling 1966 – North America
- Leccinum fibrillosum A.H.Sm., Thiers & Watling 1966 – North America
- Leccinum flavostipitatum E.A.Dick & Snell 1965
- Leccinum floccopus (E.-J.Gilbert 1931) Redeuilh 1990
- Leccinum foetidum Heinem. 1964 – Democratic Republic of the Congo
- Leccinum fuscescens A.H.Sm., Thiers & Watling 1968
- Leccinum fuscoalbum (Sowerby 1814) Lannoy & Estadès 1994

== G ==
- Leccinum glutinopallens A.H.Sm., Thiers & Watling 1967 – United States
- Leccinum griseonigrum A.H.Sm., Thiers & Watling 1967 – United States

== H ==
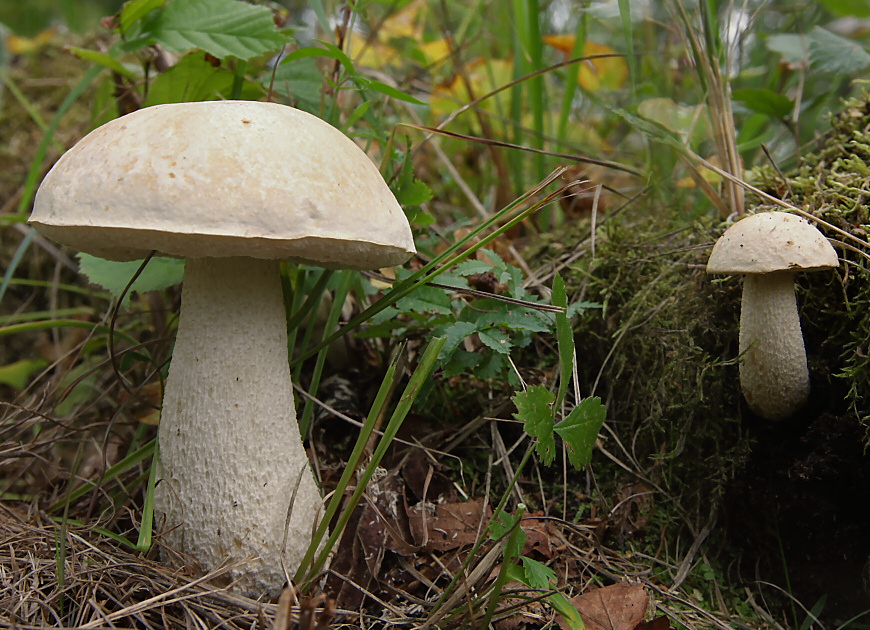
Leccinum holopus (Rostk. 1844) Watling 1960

- Leccinum hispanicum G. Moreno 1977
- Leccinum holopus (Rostk. 1844) Watling 1960
- Leccinum huronense A.H.Sm. & Thiers 1971 – United States

== I ==
- Leccinum idahoense A.H.Sm., Thiers & Watling 1968
- Leccinum imitatum A.H.Sm., Thiers & Watling 1966 – North America
- Leccinum incarnatum A.H.Sm., Thiers & Watling 1966 – North America
- Leccinum indoaurantiacum D. Chakr., K. Das, Baghela, S.K. Singh & Dentinger 2016 – North America
- Leccinum insigne A.H.Sm., Thiers & Watling 1966 – North America
- Leccinum insolens A.H.Sm., Thiers & Watling 1968
- Leccinum intusrubens (Corner 1972) Høil. 1982

== K ==
- Leccinum katmaiense V.L.Wells & Kempton 1975 – Alaska, United States

== L ==
- Leccinum laetum A.H.Sm., Thiers & Watling 1966 – North America
- Leccinum largentii Thiers 1975
- Leccinum leucophaeum (Pers. 1825) Bon 1981 – Europe
- Leccinum leucopodium (Pers. 1799) Dörfelt & G. Berg 1990
- Leccinum longicurvipes (Snell & A.H. Sm. 1940) M. Kuo & B. Ortiz 2020

== M ==
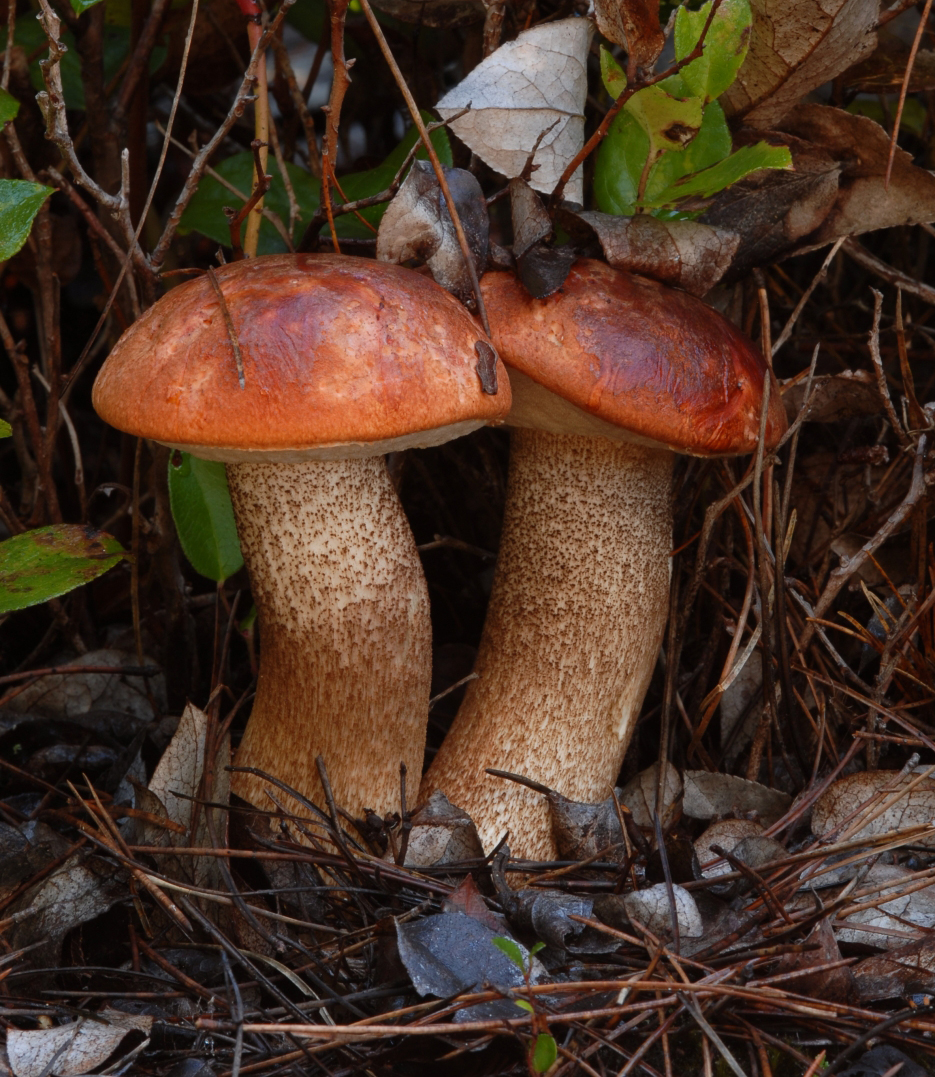
Leccinum manzanitae Thiers 1971

- Leccinum manzanitae Thiers 1971 – United States
- Leccinum melaneum (Smotl. 1951) Pilát & Dermek 1974
- Leccinum molle (Bon 1984) Bon 1989 – Europe
- Leccinum montanum Thiers 1971 – United States
- Leccinum monticola Halling & G.M.Muell. 2003 – Costa Rica
- Leccinum murinaceostipitatum A.H.Sm., Thiers & Watling 1967 – United States
- Leccinum murinaceum (J. Blum 1970) Bon 1979

== N ==
- Leccinum neotropicale Halling 1999 – Costa Rica
- Leccinum nigellum Redeuilh 1995 – Europe

== O ==
- Leccinum obscurum A.H.Sm., Thiers & Watling 1966 – North America
- Leccinum ochraceum A.H.Sm., Thiers & Watling 1966 – North America
- Leccinum olivaceoglutinosum A.H.Sm., Thiers & Watling 1967 – United States
- Leccinum olivaceopallidum A.H.Sm., Thiers & Watling 1967 – United States

== P ==
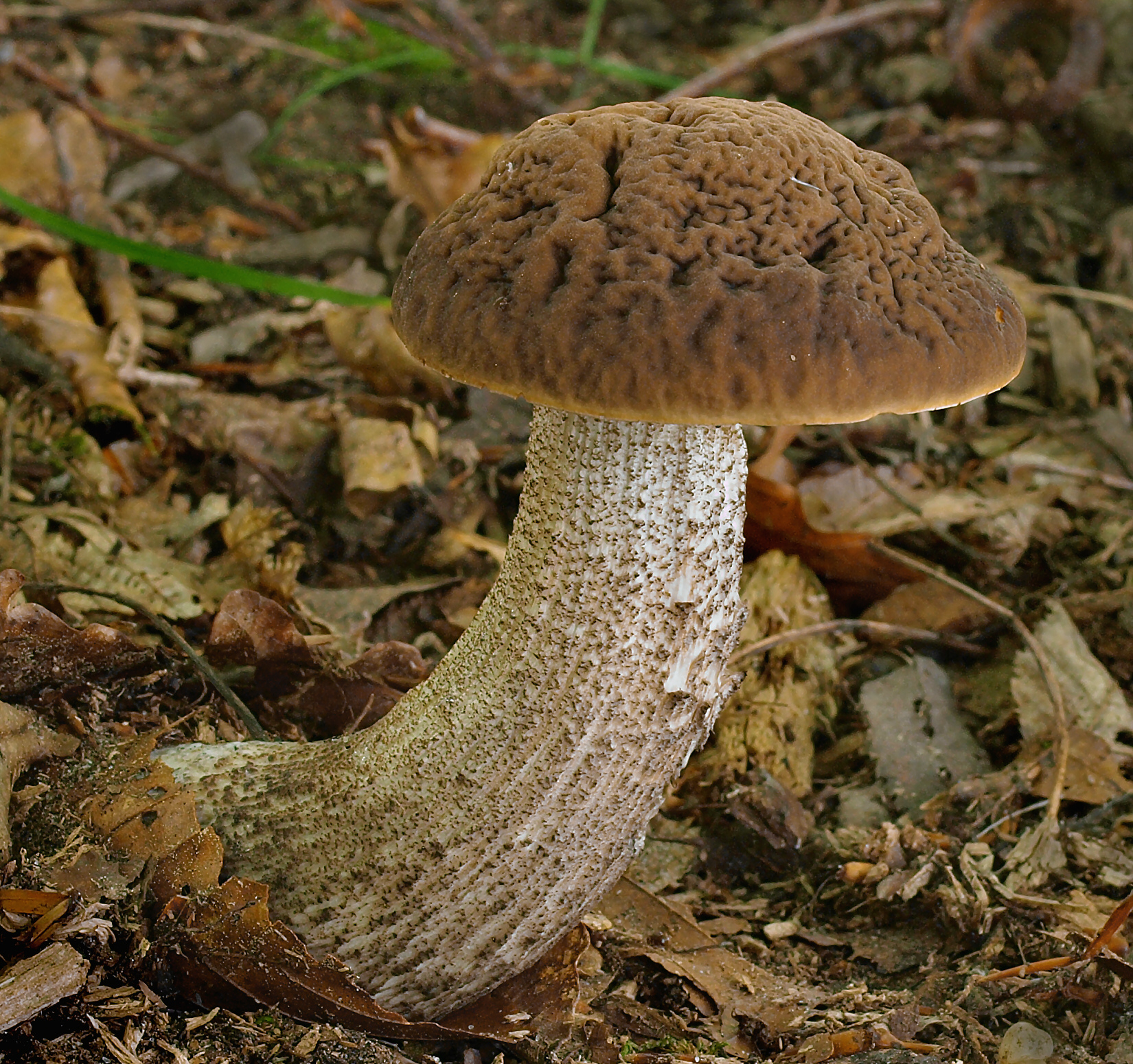
Leccinum pseudoscabrum (Kallenb. 1928) Šutara 1989

- Leccinum pachyderme (Zeller & C.W. Dodge 1934) M. Kuo & B. Ortiz 2020
- Leccinum pallidistipes A.H.Sm. & Thiers 1971 – United States
- Leccinum pallidocastaneum P.M. Wang, X. Meng, Zhu L. Yang & Yan C. Li 2022
- Leccinum parascabrum X. Meng, Yan C. Li & Zhu L. Yang 2021
- Leccinum parvisquamulosum E.A.Dick & Snell 1969
- Leccinum parvulum A.H.Sm., Thiers & Watling 1967 – United States
- Leccinum pellstonianum A.H.Sm. & Thiers 1971 – United States
- Leccinum peronatum (Corner 1974) E. Horak 2011
- Leccinum persicinum (Orihara 2015) M. Kuo & B. Ortiz 2020
- Leccinum piceinum Pilát & Dermek 1974
- Leccinum ponderosum A.H.Sm., Thiers & Watling 1966 – North America
- Leccinum porphyreum (Heinem. 1951) Heinem. 1966
- Leccinum potteri A.H.Sm., Thiers & Watling 1966 – North America
- Leccinum proliferum A.H.Sm., Thiers & Watling 1967 – United States
- Leccinum proximum A.H.Sm. & Thiers 1971 – United States
- Leccinum pseudoborneense X. Meng, Yan C. Li & Zhu L. Yang 2021
- Leccinum pseudoinsigne A.H.Sm. & Thiers 1971 – United States
- Leccinum pulchrum Lannoy & Estadès 1991

== R ==
- Leccinum rimulosum A.H.Sm. & Thiers 1971 – United States
- Leccinum roseoscabrum Singer & R.Williams 1992 – Florida, United States
- Leccinum rubroscabrum Heinem. 1964 – Democratic Republic of the Congo
- Leccinum rufum (Pers.)

== S ==
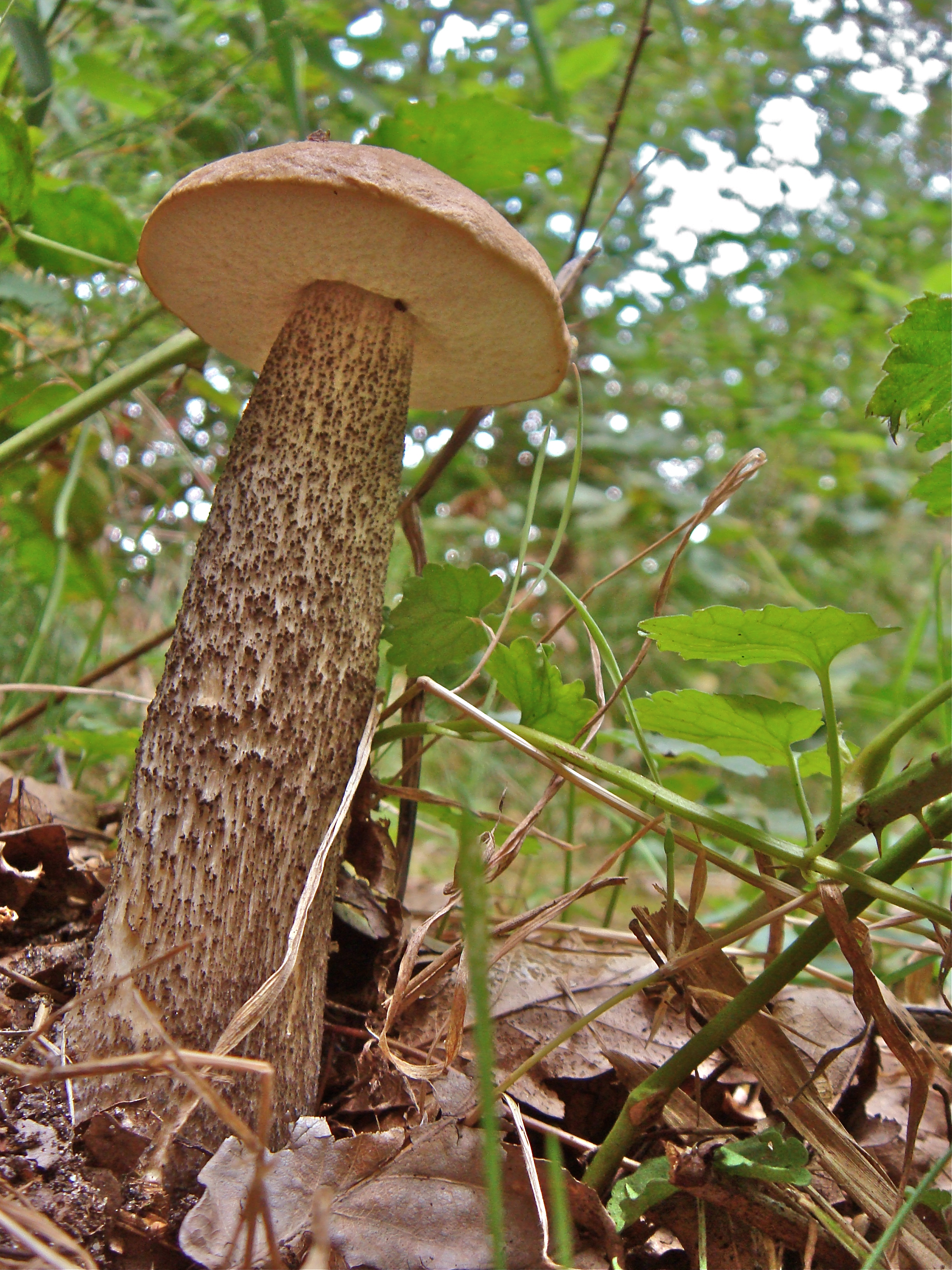
Leccinum scabrum (Bull. 1782) Gray 1821

- Leccinum scabrum (Bull. 1783) Gray 1821
- Leccinum schistophilum Bon 1981 – Great Britain
- Leccinum singeri A.H.Sm. & Thiers 1971 – United States
- Leccinum snellii A.H.Sm., Thiers & Watling 1967 – United States
- Leccinum solheimii A.H.Sm., Thiers & Watling 1966 – North America
- Leccinum squarrosipes (Corner 1974) E. Horak 2011 – North America
- Leccinum subalpinum Thiers 1976
- Leccinum subatratum A.H.Sm., Thiers & Watling 1968
- Leccinum subfulvum A.H.Sm., Thiers & Watling 1966 – North America
- Leccinum subgranulosum A.H.Sm. & Thiers 1971 – United States
- Leccinum subleucophaeum E.A.Dick & Snell 1961
- Leccinum sublutescens A.H.Sm., Thiers & Watling 1966 – North America
- Leccinum subpulchripes A.H.Sm. & Thiers 1971 – United States
- Leccinum subradicatum Hongo 1973 – Japan
- Leccinum subrobustum A.H.Sm., Thiers & Watling 1968
- Leccinum subrotundifoliae (J. Blum 1970) Bon 1979
- Leccinum subspadiceum A.H.Sm., Thiers & Watling 1968
- Leccinum subtestaceum A.H.Sm., Thiers & Watling 1966 – North America
- Leccinum succineobrunneum E.A.Dick & Snell 1969

== T ==
- Leccinum tablense Halling & G.M.Muell. 2003 – Costa Rica
- Leccinum talamancae Halling, L.D.Gómez & Lannoy 1999 – Costa Rica
- Leccinum tenax Heinem. 1964 – Democratic Republic of the Congo
- Leccinum truebloodii A.H.Sm., Thiers & Watling 1968

== U ==
- Leccinum uliginosum A.H.Sm. & Thiers 1971 – United States
- Leccinum umbonatum Heinem. 1964 – Democratic Republic of the Congo
- Leccinum umbrinoides (J.Blum 1970) Lannoy & Estadès 1991
- Leccinum ustale (Berk. 1851) E.Horak 1980

== V ==
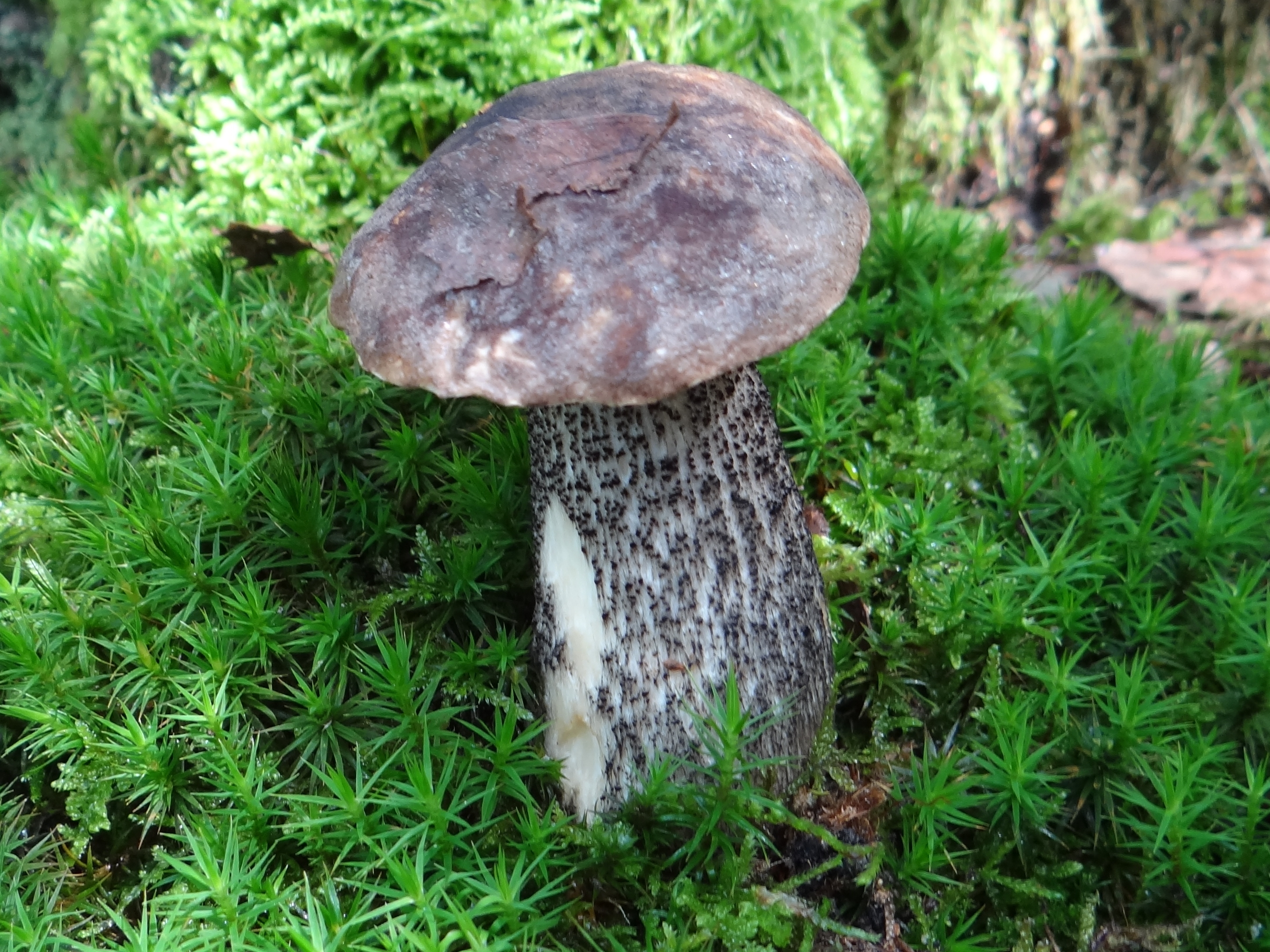
Leccinum variicolor Watling 1969

- Leccinum variabile A.H.Sm., Thiers & Watling 1967 – United States
- Leccinum variicolor Watling 1969
- Leccinum variobrunneum E.A.Dick & Snell 1969
- Leccinum versipelle (Fr. & Hök 1835) Snell 1944
- Leccinum vinaceopallidum A.H.Sm., Thiers & Watling 1968
- Leccinum violaceotinctum B.Ortiz & T.J.Baroni 2007
- Leccinum vulpinum Watling 1961 – Europe
