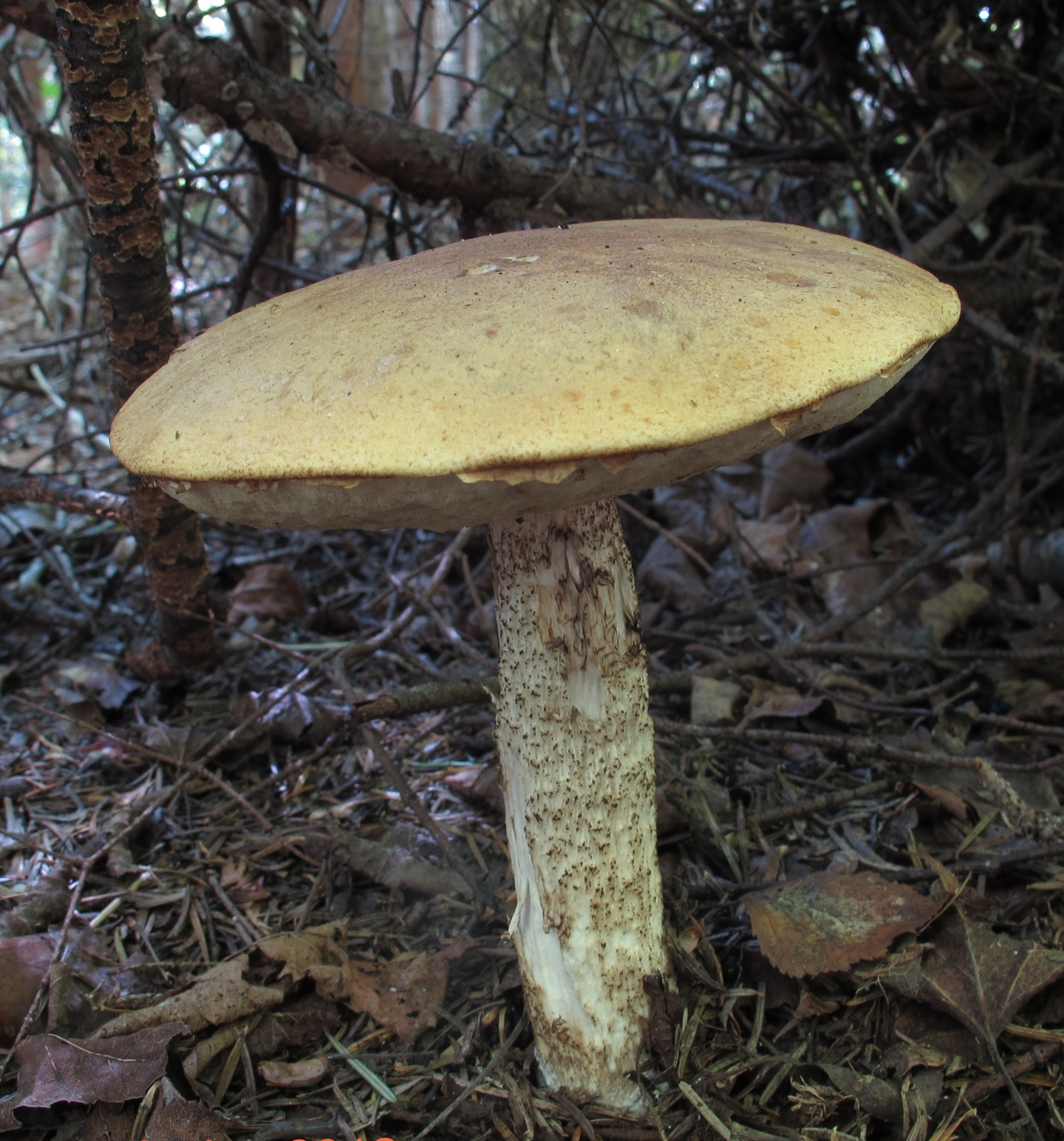
- Leccinum insolens found in Quebec, Canada

Scientific classification
- Domain: Eukaryota
- Kingdom: Fungi
- Division: Basidiomycota
- Class: Agaricomycetes
- Order: Boletales
- Family: Boletaceae
- Genus: Leccinum
- Species: L. insolens

Binomial name
- Leccinum insolens A.H.Sm., Thiers & Watling (1968)

Varieties
- Leccinum insolens var. brunneomaculatum

= Leccinum insolens =

Species of fungus

Leccinum insolens is a species of bolete fungus in the family Boletaceae. It was described as new to science in 1968 by mycologists Alexander H. Smith, Harry D. Thiers, and Roy Watling. The variety brunneomaculatum was also described by these authors.

== See also ==
- List of Leccinum species
- List of North American boletes
