= Leccinum barrowsii =

Scientific classification
- Kingdom: Fungi
- Division: Basidiomycota
- Class: Agaricomycetes
- Order: Boletales
- Family: Boletaceae
- Genus: Leccinum
- Species: L. barrowsii

Binomial name
- Leccinum barrowsii A.H.Sm., Thiers & Watling (1966)

Species of fungus

Leccinum barrowsii is a species of bolete fungus in the family Boletaceae. It is found in the southwestern United States, where it grows on the ground under conifers. The bolete was described as new to science in 1966 by mycologists Alexander H. Smith, Harry Delbert Thiers, and Roy Watling. The specific epithet honours the collector, Charles "Chuck" Barrows (1903–1989).

== See also ==
- List of Leccinum species
- List of North American boletes
