= Leccinum subatratum =

Scientific classification
- Domain: Eukaryota
- Kingdom: Fungi
- Division: Basidiomycota
- Class: Agaricomycetes
- Order: Boletales
- Family: Boletaceae
- Genus: Leccinum
- Species: L. subatratum

Binomial name
- Leccinum subatratum A.H.Sm., Thiers & Watling (1968)

Synonyms
- Krombholziella subatrata (A.H.Sm., Thiers & Watling) Šutara (1982)

Species of fungus

Leccinum subatratum is a species of bolete fungus in the family Boletaceae. It was described as new to science in 1968 by mycologists Alexander H. Smith, Harry Delbert Thiers, and Roy Watling.

== See also ==
- List of Leccinum species
- List of North American boletes
