= Leccinum boreale =

Scientific classification
- Domain: Eukaryota
- Kingdom: Fungi
- Division: Basidiomycota
- Class: Agaricomycetes
- Order: Boletales
- Family: Boletaceae
- Genus: Leccinum
- Species: L. boreale

Binomial name
- Leccinum boreale A.H.Sm., Thiers & Watling (1966)

Species of fungus

Leccinum boreale is a species of bolete fungus in the family Boletaceae. The bolete was described as new to science in 1966 by mycologists Alexander H. Smith, Harry Delbert Thiers, and Roy Watling.

A motion in legislature proposed to make this the official fungus of Alberta in 2009.

== See also ==
- List of Leccinum species
- List of North American boletes
