= Leccinum angustisporum =

Scientific classification
- Domain: Eukaryota
- Kingdom: Fungi
- Division: Basidiomycota
- Class: Agaricomycetes
- Order: Boletales
- Family: Boletaceae
- Genus: Leccinum
- Species: L. angustisporum

Binomial name
- Leccinum angustisporum A.H.Sm., Thiers & Watling (1967)

Species of fungus

Leccinum angustisporum is a species of bolete fungus in the family of Boletaceae. Found in the United States, it was described as new to science in 1967 by mycologists Alexander H. Smith, Harry Delbert Thiers, and Roy Watling.
