= Leccinum broughii =

Scientific classification
- Domain: Eukaryota
- Kingdom: Fungi
- Division: Basidiomycota
- Class: Agaricomycetes
- Order: Boletales
- Family: Boletaceae
- Genus: Leccinum
- Species: L. broughii

Binomial name
- Leccinum broughii A.H.Sm. & Thiers (1971)

Species of fungus

Leccinum broughii is a species of bolete fungus in the family Boletaceae. Found in the United States, it was described as new to science in 1971 by mycologist Alexander H. Smith and Harry Delbert Thiers.

== See also ==
- List of Leccinum species
- List of North American boletes
