= Leccinum ambiguum =

Scientific classification
- Kingdom: Fungi
- Division: Basidiomycota
- Class: Agaricomycetes
- Order: Boletales
- Family: Boletaceae
- Genus: Leccinum
- Species: L. ambiguum

Binomial name
- Leccinum ambiguum A.H.Sm. & Thiers (1971)

Species of fungus

Leccinum ambiguum is a species of bolete fungus in the family Boletaceae. Found in the United States, it was described as new to science in 1971 by mycologists Alexander H. Smith and Harry Delbert Thiers.

== See also ==
- List of Leccinum species
- List of North American boletes
