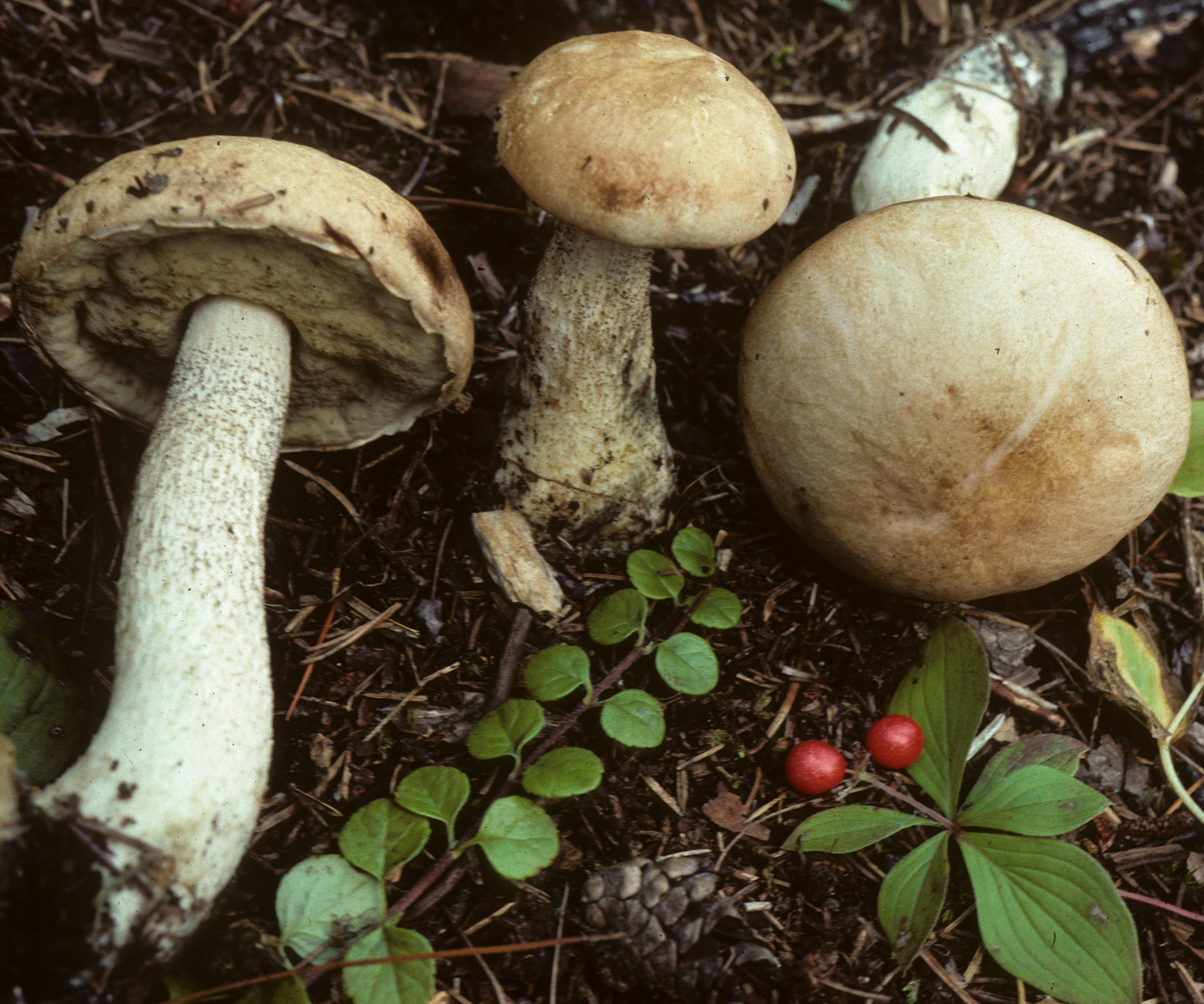

Scientific classification
- Kingdom: Fungi
- Division: Basidiomycota
- Class: Agaricomycetes
- Order: Boletales
- Family: Boletaceae
- Genus: Leccinum
- Species: L. areolatum

Binomial name
- Leccinum areolatum A.H.Sm. & Thiers (1971)

Synonyms
- Krombholziella areolata (A.H.Sm. & Thiers) Šutara (1982)

= Leccinum areolatum =

Species of fungus

Leccinum areolatum is a species of bolete fungus in the family Boletaceae. Found in the United States, it was described as new to science in 1971 by mycologists Alexander H. Smith and Harry Delbert Thiers. Josef Šutara proposed a transfer to Krombholziella in 1982.

== See also ==
- List of Leccinum species
- List of North American boletes
