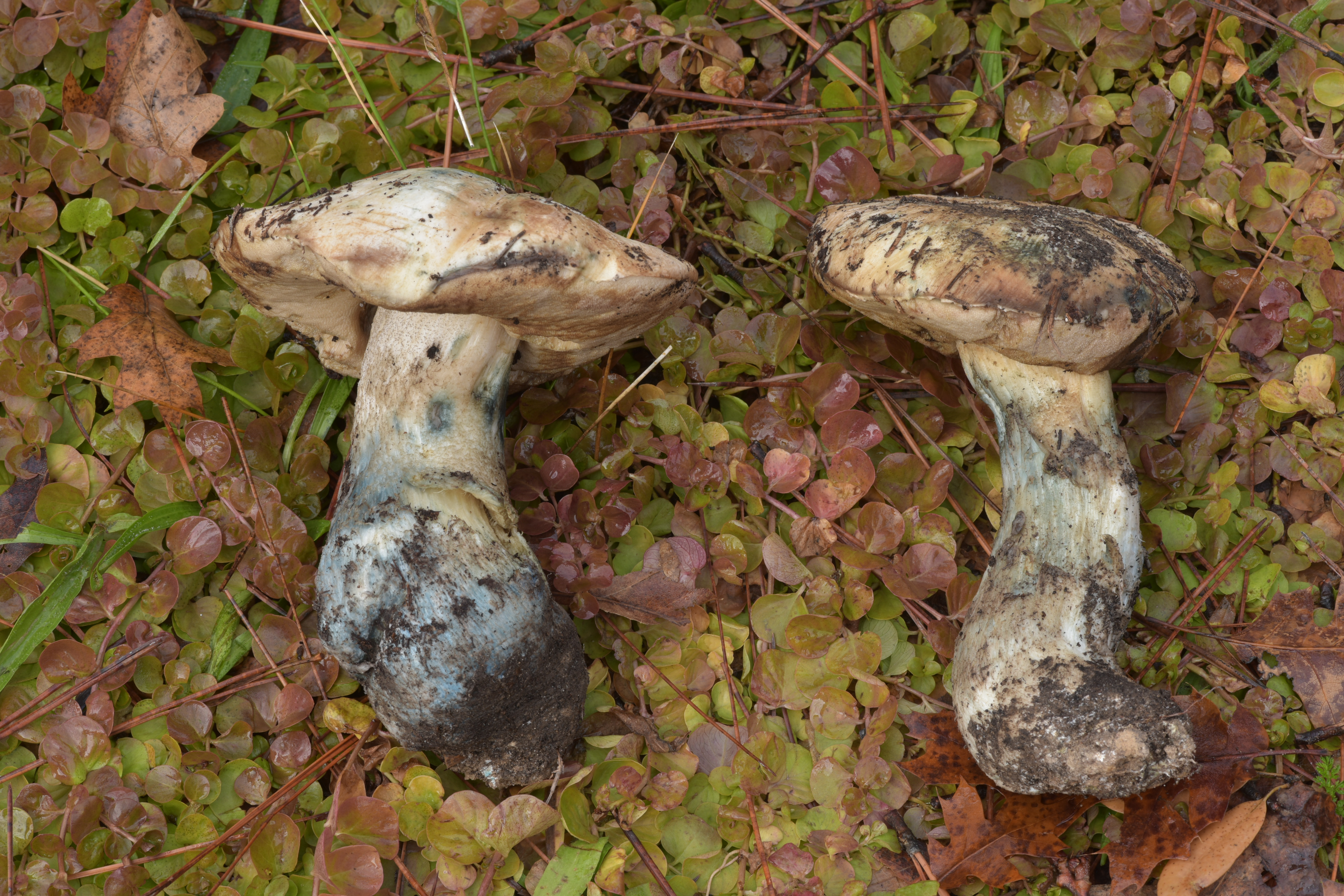

Scientific classification
- Domain: Eukaryota
- Kingdom: Fungi
- Division: Basidiomycota
- Class: Agaricomycetes
- Order: Boletales
- Family: Boletaceae
- Genus: Leccinum
- Species: L. arbuticola

Binomial name
- Leccinum arbuticola Thiers (1975)

= Leccinum arbuticola =

Species of fungus

Leccinum arbuticola is a species of bolete fungus in the family Boletaceae. It was described as new to science in 1975 by mycologist Harry Delbert Thiers, from collections made in Nevada County, California. It grows in association with madrone (Arbutus menziesii) and Manzanita It fruits in fall and early winter. It stains blue when bruised.

== See also ==
- List of Leccinum species
- List of North American boletes
