= Leccinum engelianum =

Scientific classification
- Domain: Eukaryota
- Kingdom: Fungi
- Division: Basidiomycota
- Class: Agaricomycetes
- Order: Boletales
- Family: Boletaceae
- Genus: Leccinum
- Species: L. engelianum

Binomial name
- Leccinum engelianum Klofac (2007)

Species of bolete fungus

Leccinum engelianum is a rare European bolete in the family Boletaceae. It was described in 2007 by the Austrian mycologist Wolfgang Klofac from a collection made near Kassel, Germany, and appears to form a symbiotic (mycorrhizal) partnership with European beech (Fagus sylvatica).

== Taxonomy ==
Klofac recognised this species while preparing a key to the European Boletales and named it in honour of Helmut Engel, whose earlier work had drawn attention to the material. The first specimen was gathered on 7 September 1979 beside a beech‑lined track south of Kassel (Hesse) and is preserved at the Munich herbarium. Although it was long treated as part of Leccinum atrostipitatum in a broad sense, Klofac demonstrated that a particular combination of field characters, microscopic features and simple chemical reactions justifies its recognition as a distinct species. He placed it in section Quercina on account of its reddish‑brown cap and its beech association. Key differences from both L. atrostipitatum and the superficially similar L. quercinum include its failure to bruise blue in standard tests, its flesh remaining free of blackening when cut, and the presence of fine blackish scales on the lower stipe.

== Description ==
The cap grows to about 5 cm in diameter, initially rounded then flattening out. Its surface is finely fibrous to velvety, with a bright reddish‑brown hue that often deepens at the margin. When bruised, the cap edge may slowly turn almost black, and slicing the flesh produces a brief wine‑red blush before it shifts to a grey‑violet tone. Beneath the cap are pale olive tubes up to 15 mm deep, narrowly attached to the stipe, with minute pores that develop brown‑black spotting as they age.

The stipe measures roughly 6 cm tall by 3.5 cm wide, narrowing towards a pointed base. The upper half is straw‑coloured with a faint network pattern, while the lower half bears fine dark scales or scabres. The white flesh is mild‑tasting with no distinctive odour and reddens where cut.

Microscopically, the mushroom yields a yellow‑brown spore print. Its spores are slender and fusiform, and the cap cuticle (pileipellis) comprises elongated cells bearing pigmented encrustations—traits that, along with the macroscopic characters, confirm its identity.

== Habitat and distribution ==
Leccinum engelianum fruits on loamy soil beneath mature European beech in moist broad‑leaved woodlands. Apart from the original site in Hesse, there are very few confirmed records, suggesting it is genuinely scarce or easily mistaken for more familiar red‑capped boletes. Klofac suggested that further populations may be recognised once collectors focus on its distinctive stipe scales, flesh reactions and microscopic features.

== See also ==
- List of Leccinum species
