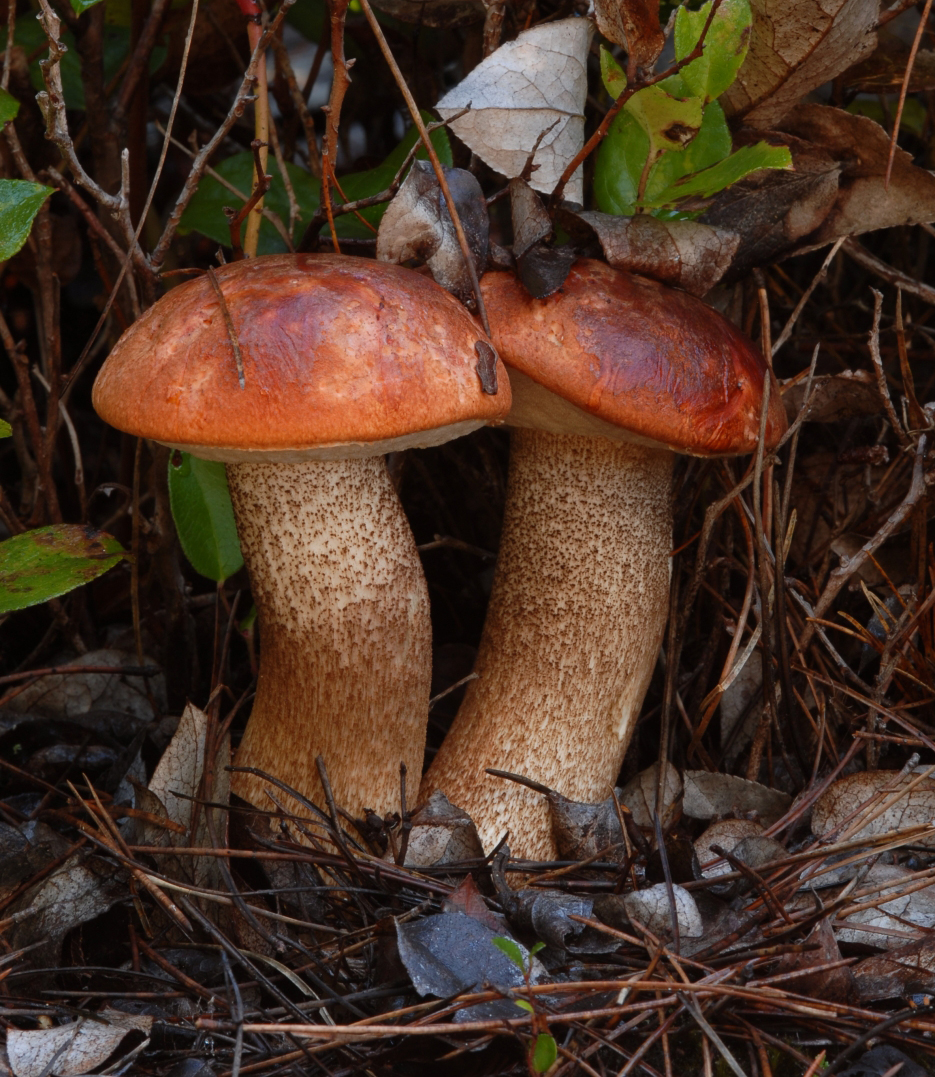

Scientific classification
- Kingdom: Fungi
- Division: Basidiomycota
- Class: Agaricomycetes
- Order: Boletales
- Family: Boletaceae
- Genus: Leccinum
- Species: L. manzanitae

Binomial name
- Leccinum manzanitae Thiers (1971)

= Leccinum manzanitae =

Species of fungus

Leccinum manzanitae Mycological characteristics
- Pores on hymenium
- Cap is convex
- Hymenium is adnate
- Stipe is bare
- Spore print is brown
- Ecology is mycorrhizal
- Edibility is edible

Leccinum manzanitae is a species of bolete fungus in the family Boletaceae. Described as new to science in 1971, it is commonly known as the manzanita bolete for its usual mycorrhizal association with manzanita trees.

Its fruit bodies (mushrooms) have sticky reddish to brown caps up to 20 cm (8 in), and its stipes are up to 16 cm (6.3 in) long and 3.5 cm (1.4 in) thick. They have a whitish background color punctuated with small black scales known as scabers. L. manzanitae can be usually distinguished from other similar bolete mushrooms by its large size, reddish cap, dark scabers on a whitish stipe, and association with manzanita and madrone.

Found only in the Pacific Northwest region of the United States and Canada, it is the most common Leccinum species in California. The mushroom is edible, although opinions vary as to its quality.

== Taxonomy ==
Leccinum manzanitae was first described by the American mycologist Harry Delbert Thiers in 1971, from collections made in San Mateo County, California, the previous year. In that state, it is known as the manzanita bolete because of its close association with manzanita trees. It is classified in subsection Versicolores of the section Leccinum in the genus Leccinum. Closely related species in this section include L. piceinum, L. monticola, L. albostipitatum, and L. versipelle.

== Description ==
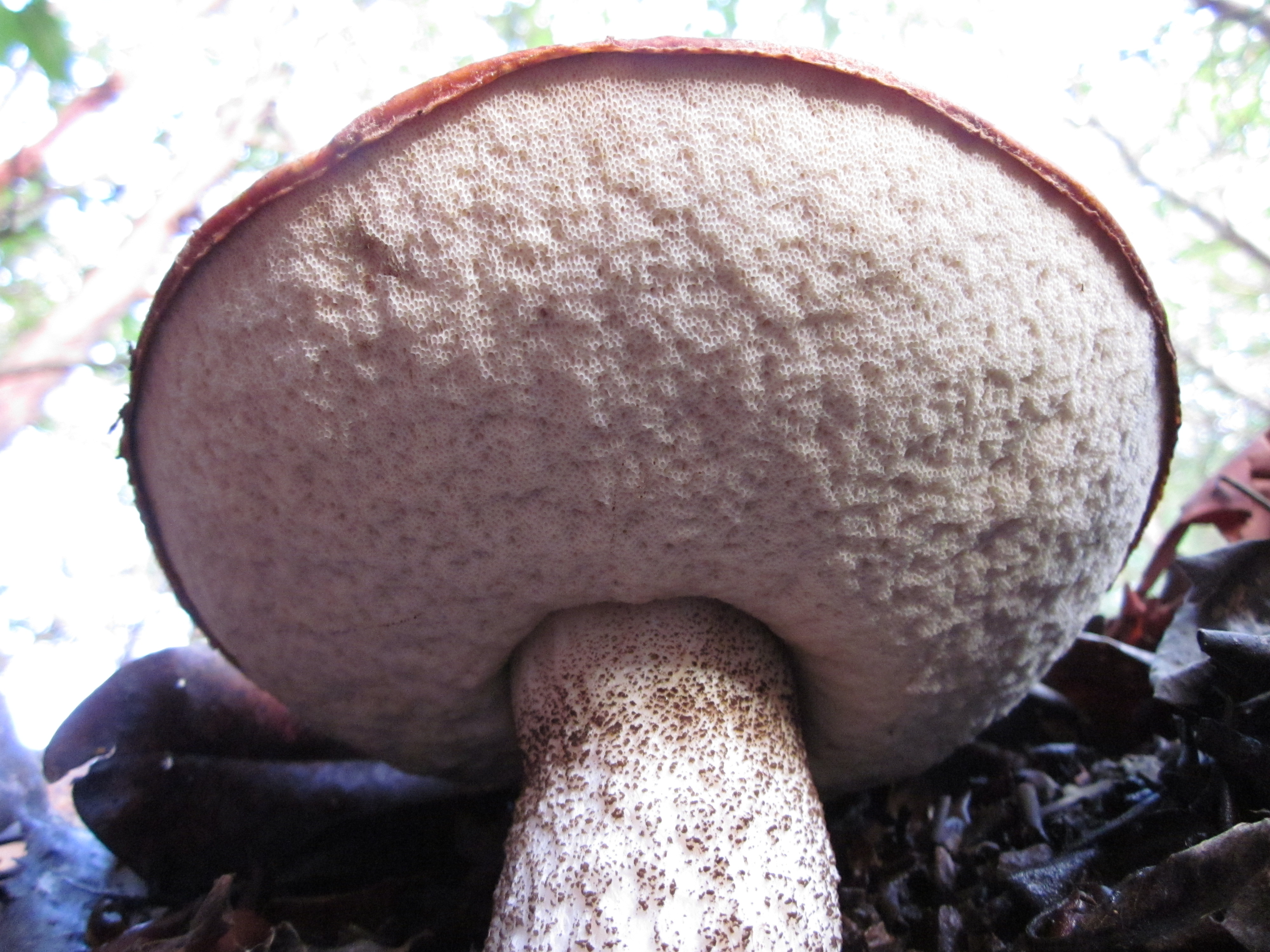
The pore surface is whitish, with pores up to 1 mm broad.

The fruit bodies of Leccinum manzanitae are sometimes massive, occasionally reaching weights of several pounds. The cap is 7–20 cm (2.8–7.9 in) in diameter, spherical to convex when young, and broadly convex to flattened or cushion-shaped (pulvinate). The surface of the cap is often shallowly to deeply pitted or reticulate, sticky, and covered with pressed-down hairs that are more conspicuous toward the edge of the cap. Its color is dark red during all stages of development. The cap's flesh is 2–4 cm (0.8–1.6 in) thick, white when first exposed, but slowly and irregularly changing to dark brownish-gray with no reddish intermediate state. The change in color upon bruising or injury is often more pronounced in young specimens.

The tubes comprising the hymenophore are 1–2.5 cm (0.5–1 in) long, with an adnate attachment to the stipe; their color is pale olive when young and darkens when bruised. Pores are up to 1 mm in diameter, angular, and the same color as the tubes. The stipe is 8–18 cm (3–7 in) long, and 1.5–4 cm (0.6–1.6 in) thick at the apex, and either club-shaped or swollen in the middle. It is solid (i.e., not hollow), with a dry surface, and covered with small, stiff, granular projections called scabers. The scabers are usually whitish when young, but eventually turn dark brownish-grey with age. The stipe flesh stains a bluish color when bruised, although this reaction is variable and sometimes slow to occur. It has no distinctive taste or odor.

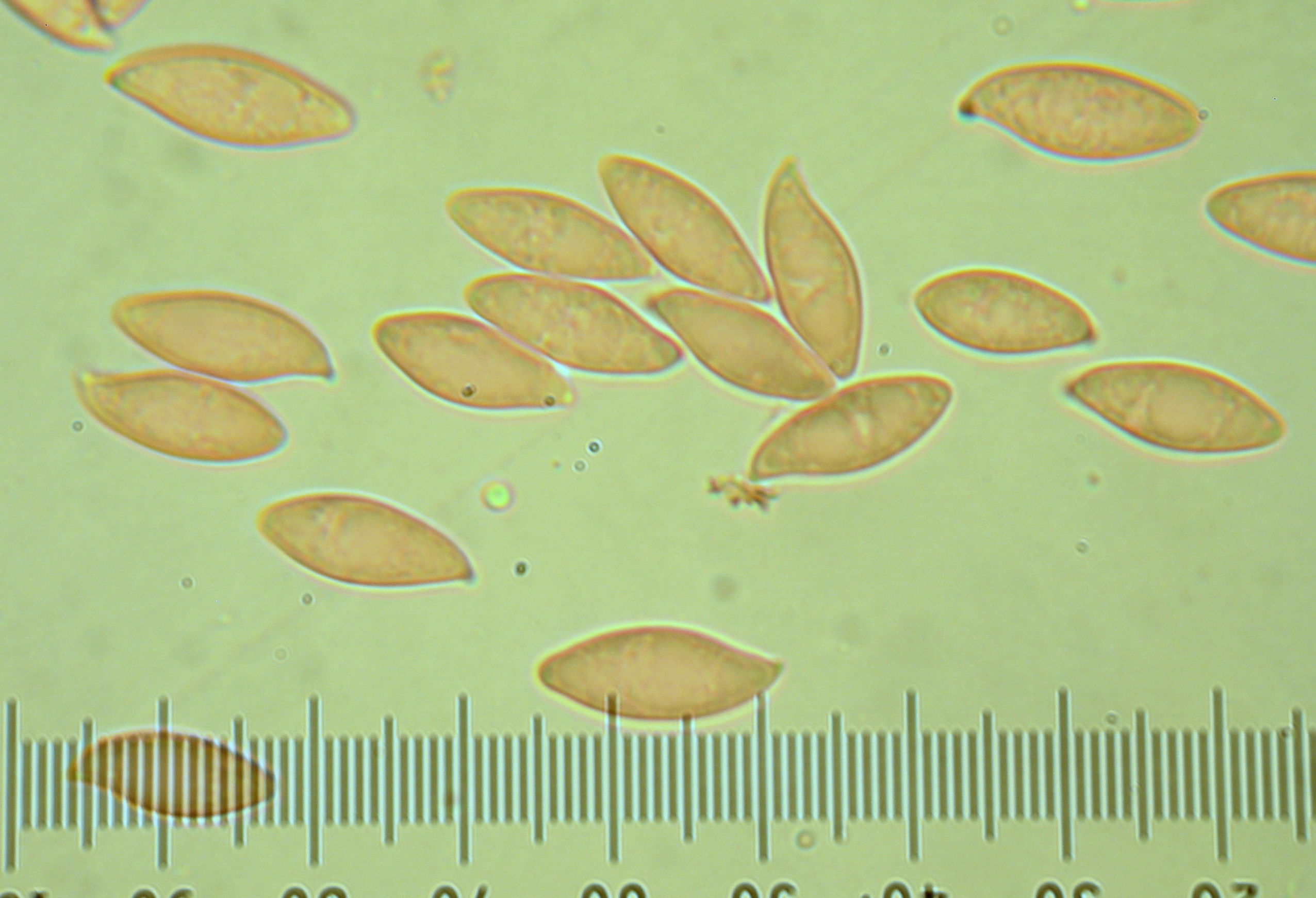
The spores are somewhat elliptical to cylindrical and tapered on each end.

Leccinum manzanitae mushroom produce a cinnamon-brown spore print. Spores are 13–17 by 4–5.5 μm, somewhat elliptical to cylindrical, and tapered on each end (fusoid); their walls are smooth and moderately thick. The spore-bearing cells, the basidia, are 27–32 by 6–9 μm, club-shaped to pear-shaped (pyriform) and four-spored. The cystidia are 23–32 by 4–6 μm, fusoid to club-shaped with narrow, elongated apices. Caulocystidia (found on the stipe surface) are thin-walled, club-shaped to somewhat fusoid, and sometimes end in a sharp point; they measure 35–45 by 9–14 μm. Clamp connections are absent in the hyphae of Leccinum manzanitae. The hyphae of the cap cuticle are arranged in the form of a trichoderm (wherein the outermost hyphae emerge roughly parallel, perpendicular to the cap surface).

Several chemical tests can be used to help confirm the identify of the mushroom: a drop of dilute (3–10%) potassium hydroxide (KOH) solution will turn the tubes pale red whereas nitric acid (HNO_{3}) on the tubes produces orange-yellow; a solution of Iron(II) sulfate (FeSO_{4}) applied to the flesh results in a pale grey color.

Thiers also described the variety L. manzanitae var. angustisporae from Mendocino County. Similar to the main form in appearance and habitat, it has smaller, narrowly elongated spores, typically 3–4 μm wide and 1–2 μm longer.

=== Similar species ===
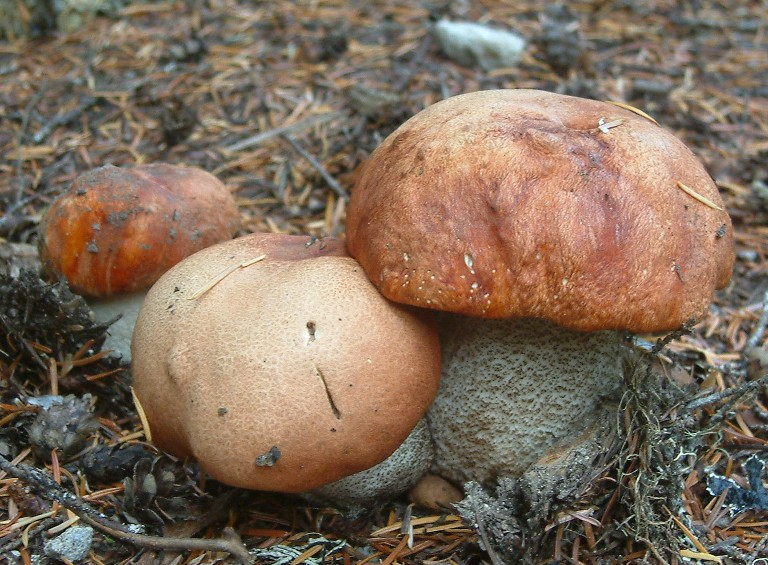
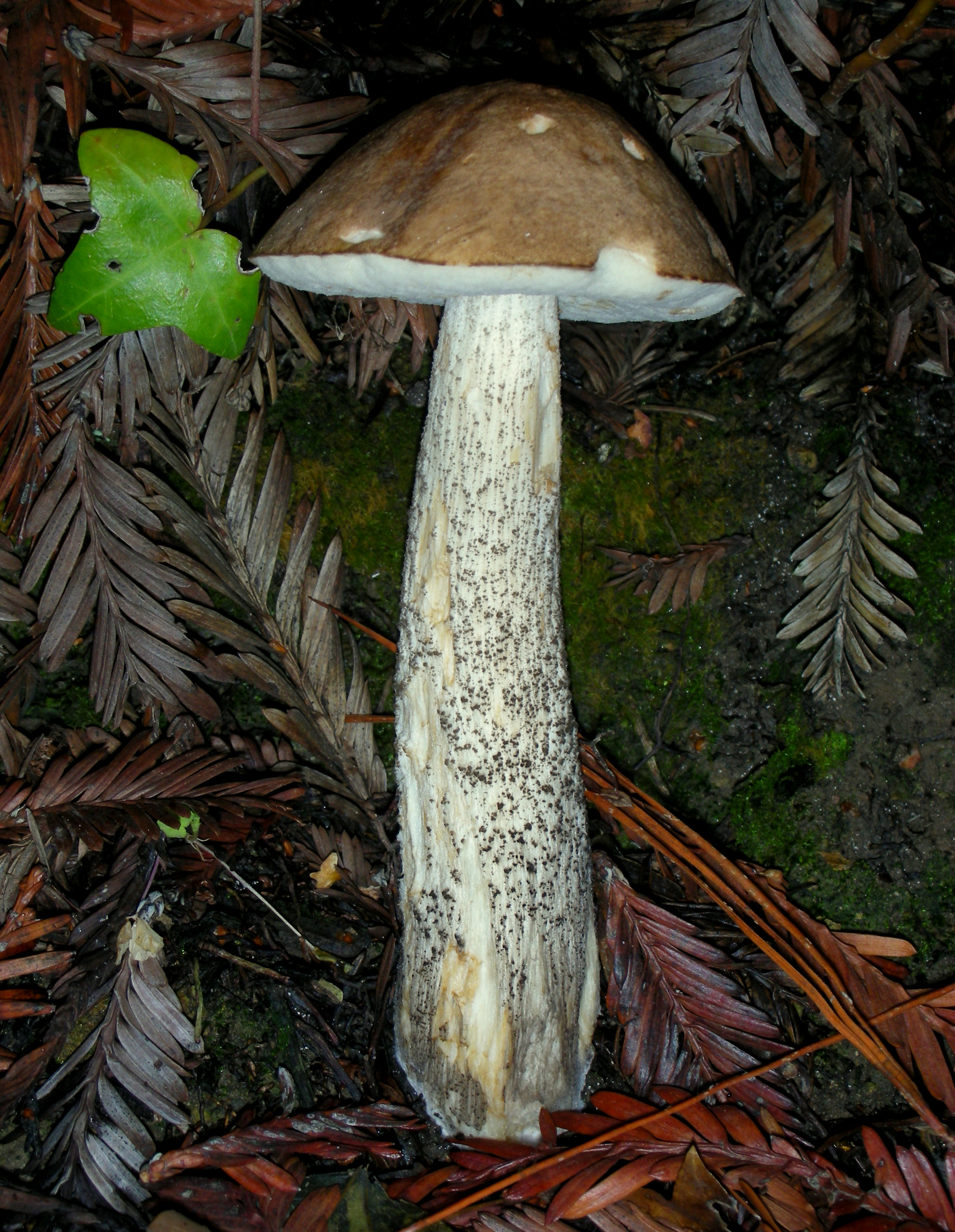
Leccinum ponderosum (left) and L. scabrum (right) are two of several lookalike species that might be mistaken for L. manzanitae.

In the field, Leccinum manzanitae fruit bodies can be usually distinguished from those of other similar bolete species by its large size, reddish cap, dark scabers on a whitish stipe, and association with manzanita and madrone. L. ponderosum also has a dark red sticky cap, but its flesh does not darken upon exposure, and its cap is smooth when young. L. armeniacum also grows with manzanita and madrone, but its cap is more orange.

L. aeneum, known only from California, is another species that associates with manzanitae and madrone. It has an orangish cap and whitish scabers on the stipe that do not darken significantly as the mushroom matures. L. insigne, found in coniferous forests with aspens, has a coloration similar to L. manzanitae. The brown-capped L. scabrum is associated with ornamental birch, usually in cultivated landscapes. L. constans, also found exclusively in California, is paler, and does not undergo color changes when the cut flesh is exposed to air; it is found near madrone in coastal regions. The species L. largentii, found in northern regions of the West Coast, has a dry cap with a fibrillose to scaly edge, dark olive pores, and densely arranged scabers on the stipe. It associates with toyon (Heteromeles arbutifolia).

== Habitat and distribution ==
Leccinum manzanitae is a mycorrhizal species. Its fruit bodies grow singly to scattered in soil under madrone and manzanita. Known to occur only in North America, it is commonly found from central California to southern Oregon, but has also been reported further north in Washington and British Columbia (Canada). Thiers considered it the most abundant Leccinum in California. It can be found from October to February.

== Edibility ==
Leccinum manzanitae is edible, and its taste is sometimes rated highly, although others have described the flavor as bland. Drying the mushroom may improve the flavor. One field guide advises caution when selecting this species for the table, as there have been poisonings reported with similar-looking mushrooms found in the Rocky Mountains and Pacific Northwest region of the United States.

== See also ==
- List of Leccinum species
- List of North American boletes
