= Leccinum aberrans =

Scientific classification
- Domain: Eukaryota
- Kingdom: Fungi
- Division: Basidiomycota
- Class: Agaricomycetes
- Order: Boletales
- Family: Boletaceae
- Genus: Leccinum
- Species: L. aberrans

Binomial name
- Leccinum aberrans Sm. & Thiers (1971)

Species of fungus

Leccinum aberrans is a species of bolete fungus in the family Boletaceae. It was discovered in the United States, and was described as new to science in 1971 by American mycologists Alexander H. Smith and Harry Delbert Thiers.
