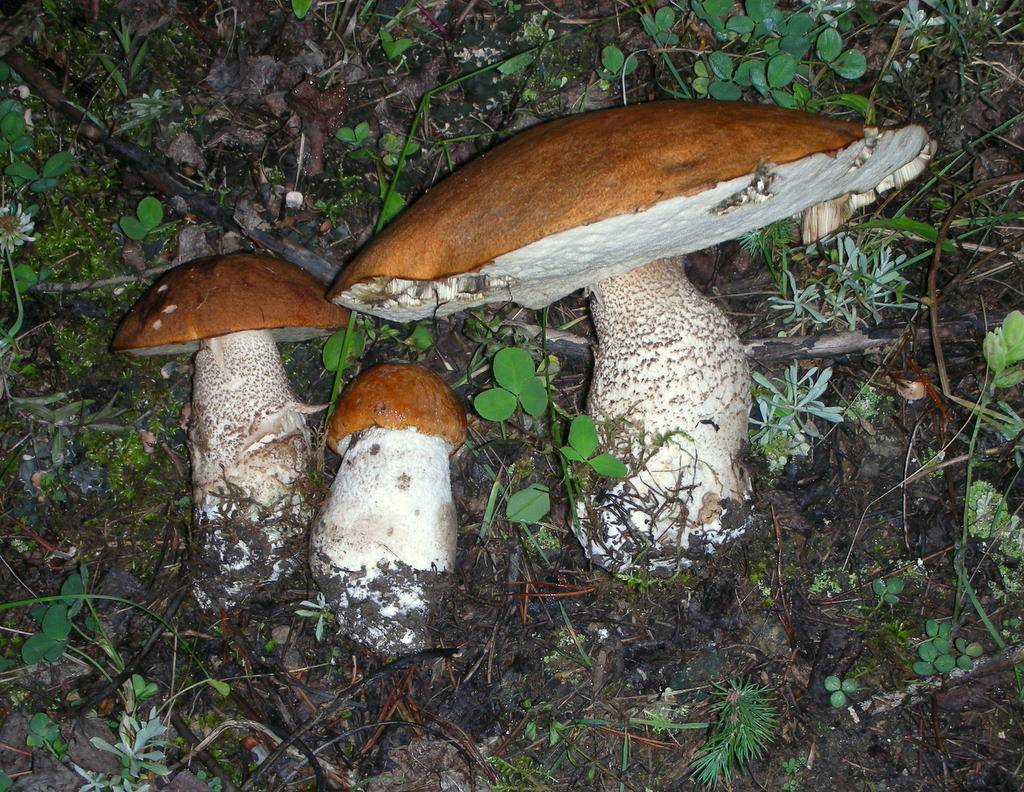

Scientific classification
- Kingdom: Fungi
- Division: Basidiomycota
- Class: Agaricomycetes
- Order: Boletales
- Family: Boletaceae
- Genus: Leccinum
- Species: L. insigne

Binomial name
- Leccinum insigne A.H.Sm., Thiers & Watling (1966)

Synonyms
- Leccinum insigne var. luteopallidum A.H.Sm. (1966); Leccinum insigne var. brunneum Thiers (1971); Krombholziella insignis (A.H.Sm., Thiers & Watling) Šutara (1982)

= Leccinum insigne =

Species of fungus

Leccinum insigne, commonly known as the aspen bolete or the aspen scaber stalk, is a species of bolete fungus in the family Boletaceae. It was described as new to science in 1966. The specific epithet insigne means "distinctive or outstanding".

The cap is up to 17 centimetres (6 3/4 in) wide, orangish-brown, and semi-fibrillose. The tubes are white to yellowish, staining brownish (not blue). The stipe is up to 15 cm long and white with dark scabers. The flesh is white, sometimes turning gray, and possibly bluish in the base. The spore print is tannish.

The species is found in North America, where its range extends from eastern Canada south to New Jersey and west to the northern Rocky Mountains. It is a good edible mushroom, but there have been documented cases of adverse reactions; these range from headaches to gastrointestinal distress, which may or may not be attributed to food sensitivities alone.

== See also ==
Leccinum insigne
- Mycological characteristics
- Pores on hymenium
- Cap is convex
- Stipe is bare
- Spore print is brown to yellow-brown
- Ecology is mycorrhizal
- Edibility is edible

- List of Leccinum species
- List of North American boletes
