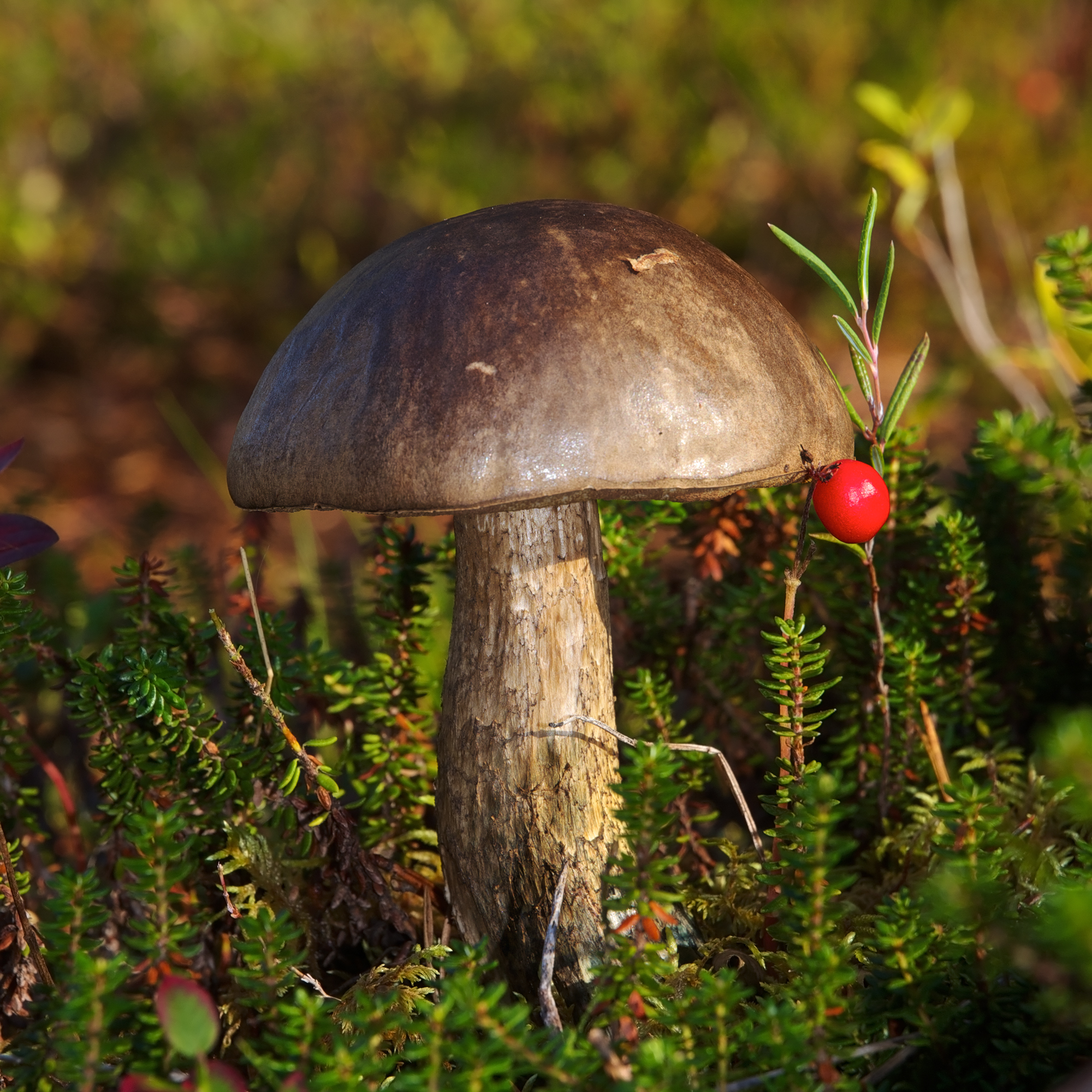

Scientific classification
- Kingdom: Fungi
- Division: Basidiomycota
- Class: Agaricomycetes
- Order: Boletales
- Family: Boletaceae
- Genus: Leccinum
- Species: L. variicolor

Binomial name
- Leccinum variicolor Watling (1969)

Synonyms
- Leccinum variicolor var. bertauxii Lannoy & Estadès 1991; Leccinum variicolor f. atrostellatum Lannoy & Estadès (1991); Boletus variicolor (Watling) Hlavácek (1989); Boletus variicolor (Watling) Hlavácek (1988); Krombholziella variicolor (Watling) Šutara (1982); Leccinum variicolor var. variicolor Watling (1969); Krombholzia scabra var. coloratipes

= Leccinum variicolor =

Species of fungus

Leccinum variicolor
- Mycological characteristics
- Pores on hymenium
- Cap is convex
- Hymenium is adnate
- Stipe is bare
- Ecology is mycorrhizal
- Edibility is edible

Leccinum variicolor is a species of bolete fungus in the genus Leccinum.

== See also ==
- List of Leccinum species
