= Leccinum umbonatum =

Scientific classification
- Domain: Eukaryota
- Kingdom: Fungi
- Division: Basidiomycota
- Class: Agaricomycetes
- Order: Boletales
- Family: Boletaceae
- Genus: Leccinum
- Species: L. umbonatum

Binomial name
- Leccinum umbonatum Heinem. (1964)

Species of fungus

Leccinum umbonatum is a species of bolete fungus in the family Boletaceae. Found in the Democratic Republic of the Congo, it was described as new to science in 1964 by French mycologist Paul Heinemann.

== See also ==
- List of Leccinum species
