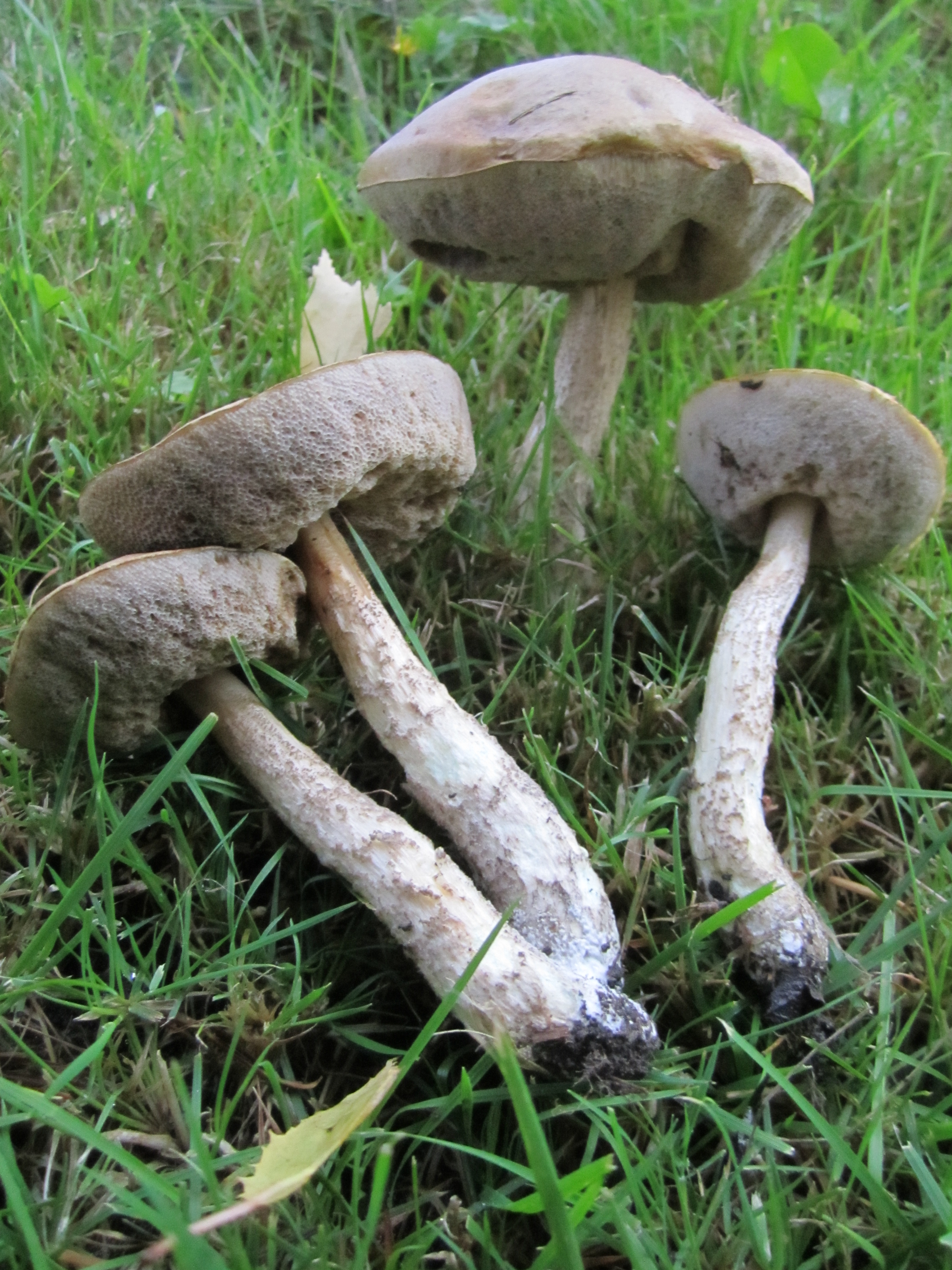

Scientific classification
- Kingdom: Fungi
- Division: Basidiomycota
- Class: Agaricomycetes
- Order: Boletales
- Family: Boletaceae
- Genus: Leccinum
- Species: L. schistophilum

Binomial name
- Leccinum schistophilum Bon (1981)

Synonyms
- Krombholziella schistophila (Bon) Alessio (1985); Leccinum palustre M.Korhonen (1995)

= Leccinum schistophilum =

Species of bolete fungus

Leccinum schistophilum is a species of bolete fungus in the family Boletaceae. Found in Europe, where it grows in association with birch, it was described as new to science in 1981 by French mycologist Marcel Bon.

== Taxonomy ==
Leccinum schistophilum is a species of bolete fungus in the family Boletaceae, first described as a new species by the French mycologist Marcel Bon in 1974. The specific epithet schistophilum refers to its habitat preference, derived from "schisto-" (relating to schist, a type of rock) and "-philum" ("loving" or "preferring"), indicating its tendency to grow on schistose soils.

The fungus belongs to the section Leccinum (Versipelles), subsection Carpinenses (indicated by the pale colours without traces of orange or reddish tints). Taxonomically, it is distinguished from related species primarily by its pale colouration, the subimmutability of its flesh (flesh that does not change colour significantly when cut), and its relatively large spores exceeding 20 μm in length.

== Habitat and distribution ==
Leccinum schistophilum grows on schistose or carboniferous soils, occasionally calcareous (with a pH around 6.5), under birch trees (Betula), with a herbaceous understory that is sparse or pioneering, often including wild strawberry (Fragaria vesca) and mouse-ear hawkweed (Pilosella officinarum).

The type specimen was collected in Labuissière (Pas-de-Calais), France on 14 October 1974. Additional specimens were collected from Roost-Warendin (Nord), France, from a site with pisolite (a type of limestone), and from Lapugnoy (Pas-de-Calais). At the time of its original publication, the species appeared to be primarily European in distribution, with documented collections from northern France. Its distribution in other regions remained to be fully documented.

== See also ==
- List of Leccinum species
