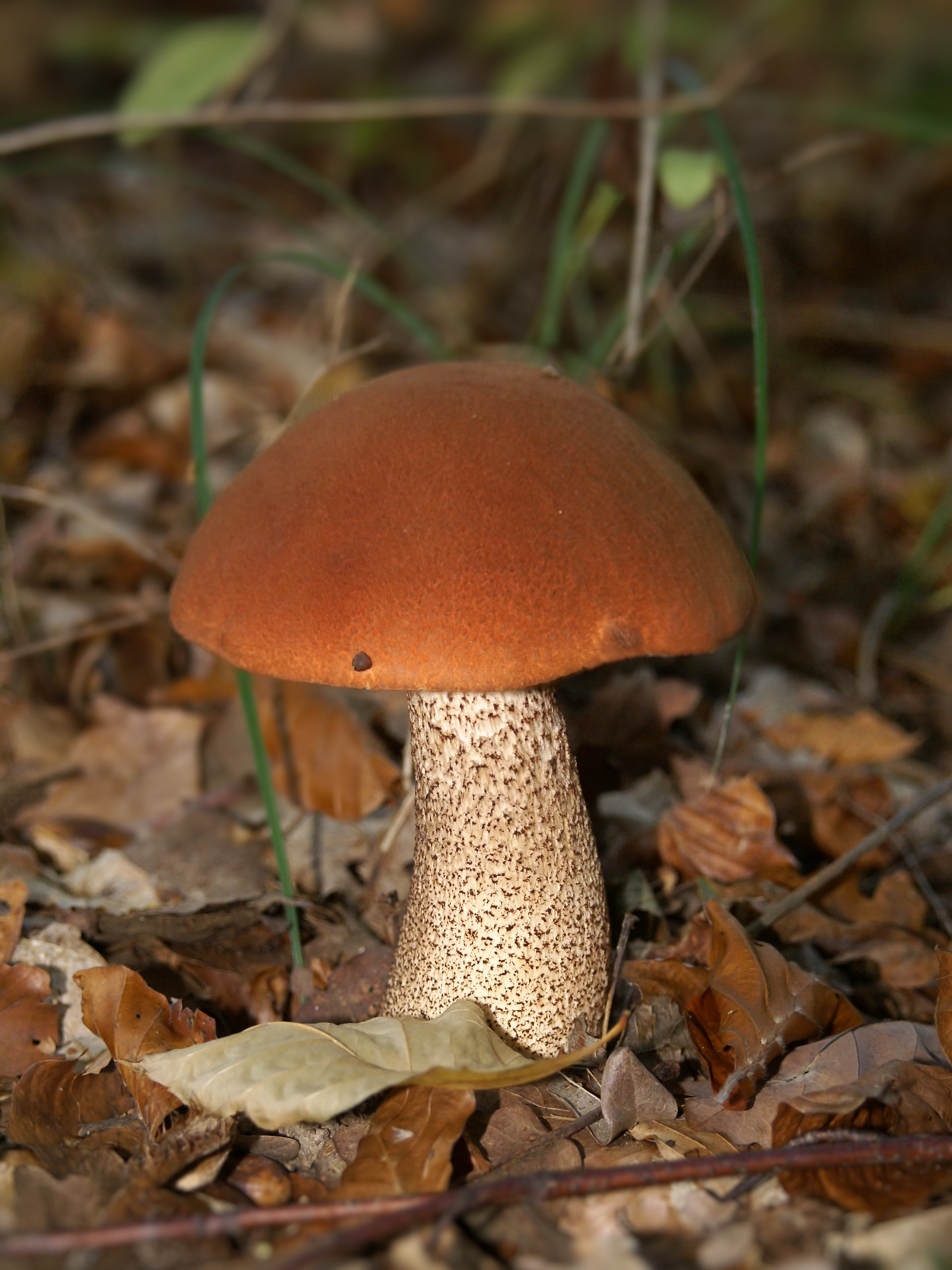
- In a Luxembourg wood

Scientific classification
- Kingdom: Fungi
- Division: Basidiomycota
- Class: Agaricomycetes
- Order: Boletales
- Family: Boletaceae
- Genus: Leccinum
- Species: L. aurantiacum

Binomial name
- Leccinum aurantiacum (Bull. ex St. Amans)

Synonyms
- List: Boletus aurantiacus; Krombholzia aurantiaca; Leccinum aurantiacum; Leccinum decipiens (Singer) Pilát & Dermek, 1974; Leccinum quercinum (Pilát) E.E. Green & Watling, 1969

= Leccinum aurantiacum =

Species of fungus

Leccinum aurantiacum
- Mycological characteristics
- Pores on hymenium
- Cap is convex
- Hymenium is adnate
- Stipe is bare
- Spore print is olive
- Ecology is mycorrhizal
- Edibility is edible but not recommended

Leccinum aurantiacum is a species of fungus in the genus Leccinum. It has a large, characteristically red-capped fruiting body. In North America, it is sometimes referred to by the common name red-capped scaber stalk.

The species is usually attributed to forests of Europe and North America, but North American specimens may actually belong to other species. It is usually considered edible, but must be cooked thoroughly and may be unsafe for some.

== Description ==
The cap is orange-red and measures 5–15 centimetres (2–6 inches) across. Its flesh is white, bruising at first burgundy, then grayish or purple-black. The underside of the cap has very small, whitish pores that bruise olive-brown. The stem measures 8–16 cm (3–6 1/2 in) tall and 2–3 cm (3/4–1 1/4 in) thick and can bruise blue-green. It is whitish, with short, rigid projections or scabers that turn to brown to black with age.

=== Similar species ===
In Europe, several orange-red capped species exist, which differ mainly in habitat. L. albostipitatum grows with aspen and has white scales on the stipe. In coniferous forests, L. vulpinum occurs around pine and spruce trees. Not all authors recognise these as distinct species.

In North America, L. insigne grows in aspen or birch stands, while L. atrostipitatum grows in birch stands. Both are edible. Another similar species is L. versipelle.

== Distribution and habitat ==
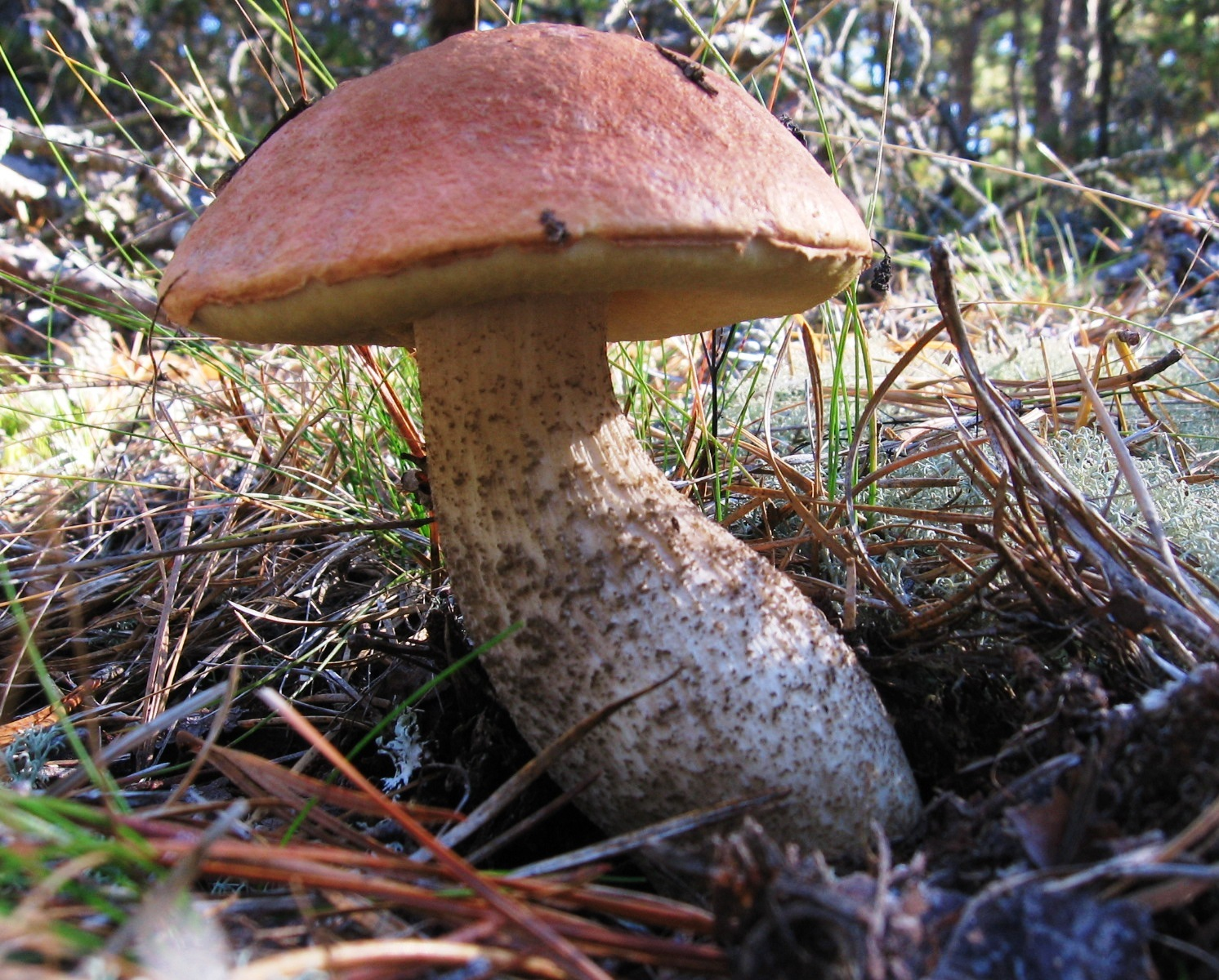
Massachusetts

L. aurantiacum can be found fruiting during summer and autumn in forests throughout Europe and North America. The association between fungus and host tree is mycorrhizal. In Europe, it has traditionally been associated with poplar trees. L. aurantiacum is found among oak and various other deciduous trees, including beech, birch, chestnut, willow, and trees of the genus Tilia. L. aurantiacum is not known to associate with conifers in Europe.

North American populations have been recorded in coniferous and deciduous forests, though it is uncertain whether collections from coniferous forests are actually L. vulpinum. Additionally, collections from deciduous forests have been attributed to other North American species such as L. insigne and L. brunneum, so L. aurantiacum may be absent altogether from North America.

== Edibility ==
This is a favorite species for eating and can be prepared as other edible boletes. Its flesh turns very dark on cooking. Like most members of the Boletaceae, these mushrooms are targeted by maggots. Due to a number of poisonings and the difficulty identifying species, Leccinum species are considered by some as possibly not safe to eat. This species also needs to be cooked well (not parboiled) or else it may cause vomiting or other negative effects. Some report gastrointestinal upset after eating this species. At least one death has been reported that was linked to consuming this species.

Leccinum aurantiacum - various sizes

== See also ==
- List of Leccinum species
- List of North American boletes
