= Leccinum brunneo-olivaceum =

Scientific classification
- Domain: Eukaryota
- Kingdom: Fungi
- Division: Basidiomycota
- Class: Agaricomycetes
- Order: Boletales
- Family: Boletaceae
- Genus: Leccinum
- Species: L. brunneo-olivaceum

Binomial name
- Leccinum brunneo-olivaceum Snell, E.A.Dick & Hesler (1951)

Species of fungus

Leccinum brunneo-olivaceum is a species of bolete fungus in the family Boletaceae. It was described as new to science in 1951 by Wally Snell, Ester Dick, and Lexemuel Ray Hesler. The type collection was made in Great Smoky Mountains National Park in Tennessee.

== See also ==
- List of Leccinum species
- List of North American boletes
