= Leccinum arctostaphyli =

Scientific classification
- Domain: Eukaryota
- Kingdom: Fungi
- Division: Basidiomycota
- Class: Agaricomycetes
- Order: Boletales
- Family: Boletaceae
- Genus: Leccinum
- Species: L. arctostaphyli

Binomial name
- Leccinum arctostaphyli V.L.Wells & Kempton (1967)

Species of fungus

Leccinum arctostaphyli is a species of bolete fungus in the family Boletaceae. Found in northwestern North America, including Alaska and British Columbia, it was described as new to science in 1967.

== See also ==
- List of Leccinum species
- List of North American boletes
