= Leccinum armeniacum =

Scientific classification
- Domain: Eukaryota
- Kingdom: Fungi
- Division: Basidiomycota
- Class: Agaricomycetes
- Order: Boletales
- Family: Boletaceae
- Genus: Leccinum
- Species: L. armeniacum

Binomial name
- Leccinum armeniacum Thiers (1971)

Species of fungus

Leccinum armeniacum is a species of bolete fungus in the family Boletaceae. Found in the United States, it was described as new to science in 1971 by Harry Delbert Thiers.

== See also ==
- List of Leccinum species
- List of North American boletes
