= Leccinum alboroseolum =

Scientific classification
- Domain: Eukaryota
- Kingdom: Fungi
- Division: Basidiomycota
- Class: Agaricomycetes
- Order: Boletales
- Family: Boletaceae
- Genus: Leccinum
- Species: L. alboroseolum

Binomial name
- Leccinum alboroseolum (J.Blum) Lannoy & Estadès (1994)

Synonyms
- Boletus immutabilis var. alboroseolus J.Blum (1969)

Species of fungus

Leccinum alboroseolum is a species of bolete fungus in the family Boletaceae. Originally described in 1969 as a variety of Boletus immutabilis, it was transferred to Leccinum in 1994. It is found in Europe.

== See also ==
- List of Leccinum species
