= Leccinum arctoi =

Scientific classification
- Domain: Eukaryota
- Kingdom: Fungi
- Division: Basidiomycota
- Class: Agaricomycetes
- Order: Boletales
- Family: Boletaceae
- Genus: Leccinum
- Species: L. arctoi

Binomial name
- Leccinum arctoi Vassilkov (1978)

Species of fungus

Leccinum arctoi is a species of bolete fungus in the family Boletaceae. Found in the Russian Far East, it was described as new to science in 1978.

== See also ==
- List of Leccinum species
