= Leccinum leucophaeum =

Scientific classification
- Domain: Eukaryota
- Kingdom: Fungi
- Division: Basidiomycota
- Class: Agaricomycetes
- Order: Boletales
- Family: Boletaceae
- Genus: Leccinum
- Species: L. leucophaeum

Binomial name
- Leccinum leucophaeum (Pers.) Bon (1981)

Synonyms
- Boletus leucophaeus Pers. (1825); Krombholziella aurantiaca subsp. leucophaea (Pers.) Maire (1937); Trachypus leucophaeus (Pers.) J.Favre (1948); Krombholzia leucophaeus (Pers.) Iordanov, Vanev & Fakirova (1979)

Species of fungus

Leccinum leucophaeum is a species of bolete fungus in the family Boletaceae. It was originally described as new to science in 1825 by Christian Hendrik Persoon, and transferred to Leccinum by French mycologist Marcel Bon in 1981.

== See also ==
- List of Leccinum species
