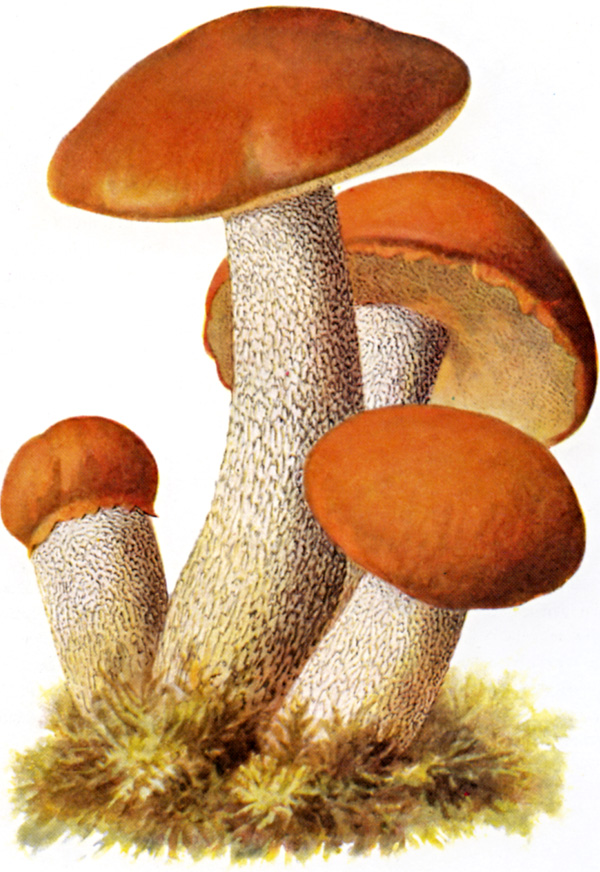

Scientific classification
- Domain: Eukaryota
- Kingdom: Fungi
- Division: Basidiomycota
- Class: Agaricomycetes
- Order: Boletales
- Family: Boletaceae
- Genus: Leccinum
- Species: L. rufum

Binomial name
- Leccinum rufum (Pers.) Kreisel

= Leccinum rufum =

Species of fungus

Leccinum rufum is a species of fungus in the genus Leccinum.
