= Leccinum violaceotinctum =

Scientific classification
- Domain: Eukaryota
- Kingdom: Fungi
- Division: Basidiomycota
- Class: Agaricomycetes
- Order: Boletales
- Family: Boletaceae
- Genus: Leccinum
- Species: L. violaceotinctum

Binomial name
- Leccinum violaceotinctum B.Ortiz (2007)

Species of fungus

Leccinum violaceotinctum is a species of bolete fungus in the family Boletaceae. Found in Belize under Pinus caribaea and Quercus spp, it was described as new to science in 2007.

== See also ==
- List of Leccinum species
