= Russula xanthoporphyrea =

Scientific classification
- Domain: Eukaryota
- Kingdom: Fungi
- Division: Basidiomycota
- Class: Agaricomycetes
- Order: Russulales
- Family: Russulaceae
- Genus: Russula
- Species: R. xanthoporphyrea

Binomial name
- Russula xanthoporphyrea Thiers

Species of fungus

Russula xanthoporphyrea is a mushroom in the family Russulaceae native to North America.

== See also ==
- List of Russula species
