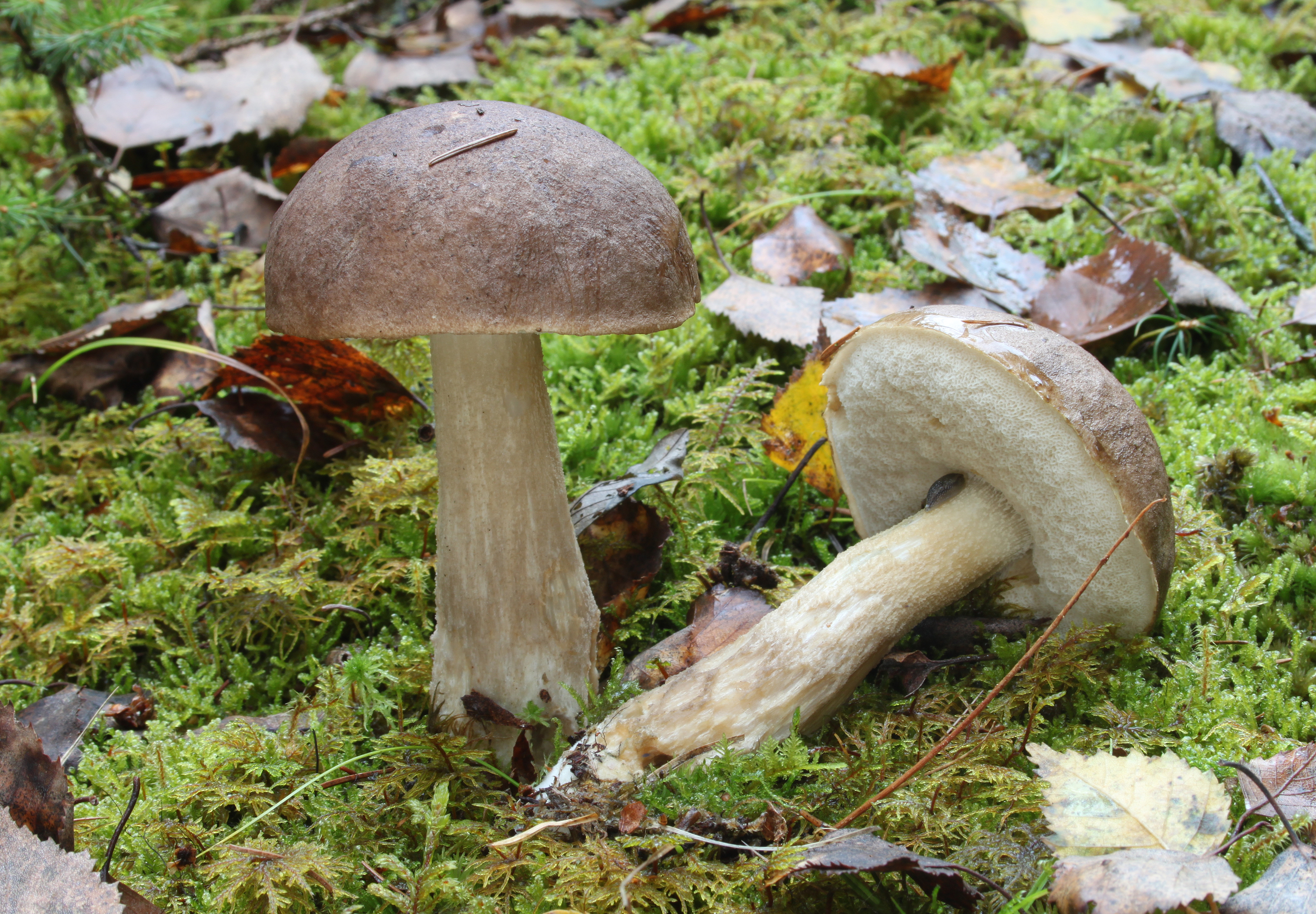

Scientific classification
- Kingdom: Fungi
- Division: Basidiomycota
- Class: Agaricomycetes
- Order: Boletales
- Family: Boletaceae
- Genus: Leccinum
- Species: L. cyaneobasileucum

Binomial name
- Leccinum cyaneobasileucum Lannoy & Estadès (1991)

Synonyms
- Leccinum brunneogriseolum Lannoy & Estadès (1991); Leccinum brunneogriseolum var. pubescentium Lannoy & Estadès (1991); Leccinum brunneogriseolum f. chlorinum Lannoy & Estadès (1991)

= Leccinum cyaneobasileucum =

Species of fungus

Leccinum cyaneobasileucum is a species of bolete fungus in the family Boletaceae. Originally found growing under silver birch, it was described as new to science in 1991. The fungus produces fruit bodies with caps measuring 5–15 cm (2–6 in) wide that range in colour from hazel, to reddish-yellow, to walnut brown. The white to grey stipe measures 7–20 cm (3–8 in) long by 0.8–2 cm (0.3–0.8 in) thick and is covered with brownish scales. In deposit the spores are walnut brown; microscopically, they are somewhat spindle shaped and measure 14–18 by 5–6 μm. L. cyaneobasileucum grows under birch, usually in moss. The mushroom is edible but according to the British botanist Roger Phillips, not particularly tasty.

== See also ==
- List of Leccinum species
