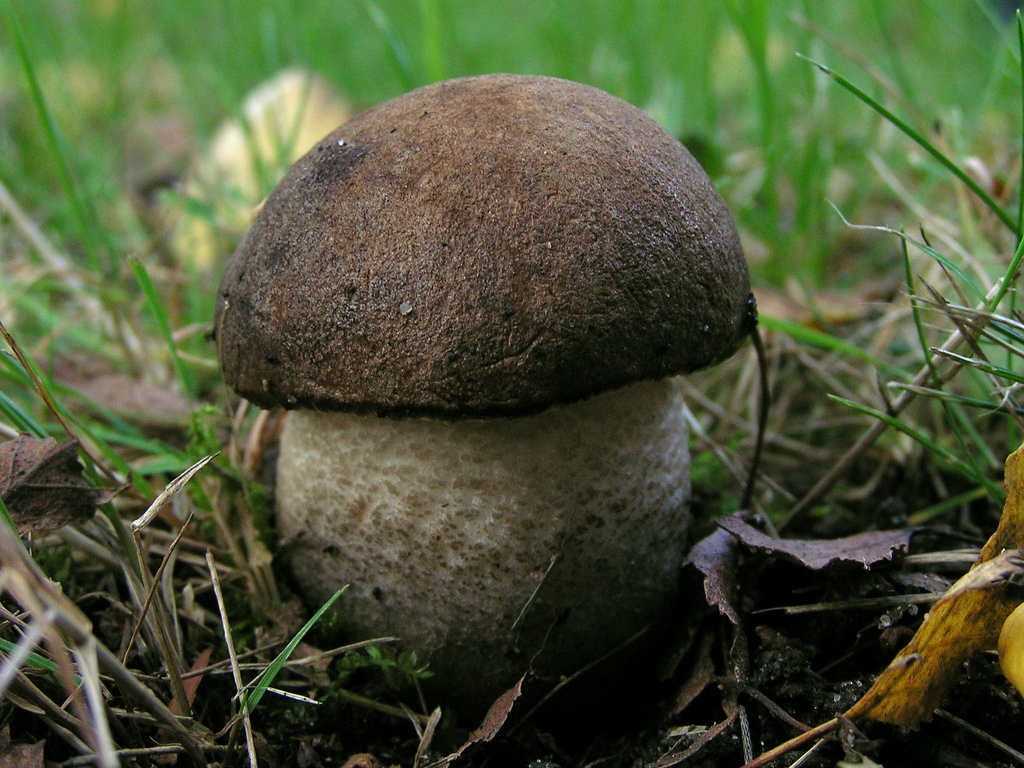

Scientific classification
- Domain: Eukaryota
- Kingdom: Fungi
- Division: Basidiomycota
- Class: Agaricomycetes
- Order: Boletales
- Family: Boletaceae
- Genus: Leccinum
- Species: L. melaneum

Binomial name
- Leccinum melaneum (Smotl.) Pilát & Dermek (1974)

= Leccinum melaneum =

Species of fungus

Leccinum melaneum is a species of fungus belonging to the family Boletaceae.

It is native to Europe and Northern America.
