= Roy Watling =

Scottish mycologist

Roy Watling MBE FRSE FIBiol FLS
- Born: Roy Watling; 1938 (age 87–88); Scotland
- Education: PhD., DSc
- Occupation: mycologist
- Employer(s): Royal Botanic Garden Edinburgh; Ramkhamhaeng University (Bangkok, Thailand)
- Awards: Patrick Neill Medal; Royal Society for the Protection of Birds Nature Award

Roy Watling (born 1938) is a Scottish mycologist who has made significant contributions to the study of fungi both in the identification of new species and correct taxonomic placement, as well as in fungal ecology.

== Biography ==
Watling was the Head of Mycology and Plant Pathology and Acting Regius Keeper of the Royal Botanic Garden Edinburgh. He was a visiting professor at Ramkhamhaeng University in Bangkok, Thailand. He was awarded a Patrick Neill Medal and an Outstanding Contribution to Nature Award from the Royal Society for the Protection of Birds. He is a member of the German, American, and Dutch Mycological Societies and the North American Mycological Association. Since his retirement, he has led fungal forays and education events for youth in and around Edinburgh. He was president of the Botanical Society of Scotland from 1984 to 1986. In 1997, Watling received the honour of Member of the Most Excellent Order of the British Empire (MBE) for services to science. In 1998, the Royal Society of Edinburgh awarded him the Neill Medal, a triennial distinction recognising outstanding work by a Scottish naturalist.

While much of his work has been identifying and expanding knowledge of fungi in the tropics, Watling has also done extensive research in much of the UK and North America. He is listed as an author of over 500 fungal taxa in the nomenclatural database MycoBank. An example of Watling's work in Scotland can be seen in a 1983 study detailing the fungal populations of the Hebrides; this study highlights how little is known of fungi in some isolated locations in the United Kingdom. Working with R. W. G. Dennis, Watling published several papers adding to the 1,787 fungi on the Island of Mull in the Inner Hebrides. The unique geographic composition of these islands and limited human influence make the Hebrides an exciting location for fungal diversity. His work in the Shetland Islands, Hebrides, and northern Scotland provides insight into distribution patterns of Russula, Laccaria, Inocybe, Cortinarius, Amanita nivalis, Omphalina alpina and Omphalina hudsoniana (as well as other taxa) about climatic and geographical variance. This information was further updated in 1994 with his publication of The Fungus Flora of Shetland and in 1999 publication of The Fungus Flora of Orkney. Further research into the alpine, arctic relationship with fungi can be seen in his study of seven taxa of coprophilous fungi in the Falkland Islands.

Watling has written books ranging from high specificity on topics like Boletus diversity to entry-level mycology books. He was one of the editors of the first compendium of Basidiomycota of the British Isles. His work has also had broader global impacts outside of the fungi kingdom. His work focusing on chloromethane production provides evidence of the role of white-rot fungi in the tropical rainforest methane cycle. This is especially critical with the broader global warming and deforestation impacts of the tropics. This research was further developed by a study published in 2005 that found that fungi are one of the largest sources of atmospheric chloromethane production. This information also suggests the more significant impact of white-rot wood decay fungi in developing a microbial soil sink for chloromethane.

Watling has also worked on developmental studies of fungal fruit bodies. His work has contributed to polymorphism studies with Psilocybe merdaria and dimorphism in Entoloma abortivum. Watling was also the first to correctly identify and describe a parasitic relationship between Entoloma and Armillaria in their carpophoroid form. While the debate is still on the parasitic relationship of whom parasitises whom, Watling's discovery has shed light on a new relationship between fungi on an important edible mushroom. Watling has studied the genus Armillaria. A compendium was published in 1982, and studies of Armillaria in Australia and the United States.

=== Royal Botanical Gardens Edinburgh ===
As head of mycology at the RBGE, he staged fungal forays at Dawyck Botanic Garden. At the RBGE, he established further knowledge of ectomycorrhizal (ECM) relations to specific trees and their distributions across the UK. He contributed Scottish material to a diverse range of fungal collections in the RBGE herbarium.

One of his publications focused on the Sitka Spruce, a forestry tree species introduced to Scotland, as well as macrofungi in the oak woods, birch woods, and willows of the UK. This information and his paper published in 1981 on macromycetes and development in higher plant communities illustrate the uniquely important role ECM fungi have in the UK.

His work has also extended to studying ECM fungi in Kashmir and the Guinea-Congo. While Watling is semi-retired, he is still called upon regularly for mushroom identification and leads many educational forays. He helped to identify a new species in Thailand that was recently named in honour of the Thai Queen Sirikit in 2014. Fungus species named after Watling include Amanita watlingii, Conocybe watlingii, and Ramaria watlingii.

He helped celebrate Beatrix Potter's work as a mycologist and scientific artist.

== Eponyms of Roy Watling ==
=== Eponymous species ===
- Amanita watlingii Ash.Kumar & T.N.Lakh.
- Boletopsis watlingii Blanco-Dios
- Conocybe watlingii Hauskn.
- Paurocotylis watlingii Healy & M.E.Sm.
- Ramaria watlingii R.H.Petersen
