= Alexander H. Smith =

American mycologist (1904-1986)

Alexander Hanchett Smith
- Born: December 13, 1904; Crandon, Wisconsin, U.S.
- Died: December 12, 1986 (aged 81); Ann Arbor, Michigan, U.S.
- Education: University of Michigan
- Known for: Contributions to the taxonomy and phylogeny of the higher fungi
- Spouse: Helen Vandervort Smith
- Scientific career
- Fields: Mycology
- Workplaces: University of Michigan
- Doctoral advisor: C.H. Kauffman, E.B. Mains
- Author abbrev. (botany): A.H.Sm.

Alexander Hanchett Smith (December 12, 1904 – December 12, 1986) was an American mycologist known for his extensive contributions to the taxonomy and phylogeny of the higher fungi, especially the agarics.

== Early life ==
Smith, born in Crandon, Wisconsin, was the second child of Ruth M. and Edward A. Schmidt, who later changed their name to Smith. After the death of his mother in his teens, Smith and family moved to West De Pere, Wisconsin, to live with their paternal grandparents.

== Education ==
Smith graduated from high school in West De Pere in 1923. A year later, he entered Lawrence College in Appleton, Wisconsin, where he received a B.A. degree in 1928. He applied for a fellowship at the University of Michigan and began graduate studies in botany in the fall of 1928 with the eminent mycologist Calvin H. Kauffman as his advisor. Kauffman died before Smith completed his degree, so he continued his studies under professor Edwin Butterworth Mains, eventually earning his M.A. in 1929 and his Ph.D. in 1933. His doctoral dissertation was entitled "Investigations of Two-spored Forms in the Genus Mycena", which was later published as a journal article.

== Career ==
In 1934 he was appointed assistant curator at the University of Michigan Herbarium, where he was to spend his entire professional career. He was appointed director of the Herbarium in 1959 and served in that capacity until 1972. In 1968, he served as deputy director of the Biological Station. Smith married fellow graduate student Helen Vandervort Smith, who received her Ph.D. in botany at the University of Michigan. They would work together later, she co-authoring and illustrating some of his publications.

Helen and Alexander Smith's daughter, Nancy Smith Weber, born in 1943, would accompany her parents on mycological expeditions and forays. Following in her parents' footsteps, she also completed a doctorate at the University of Michigan in mycology and worked as a mycologist.

Smith was president of the Mycological Society of America, and from 1945 to 1950 served as editor of the scientific journal Mycologia in 1950. He was president of the Michigan Academy of Science, Arts, and Letters, the Michigan Academy (1966–67), the Michigan Botanical Club, the Torrey Botanical Club, and the Research Club of the University of Michigan in 1974–75.

Smith taught formal courses at the university in Ann Arbor in addition to summer field courses at the University of Michigan Biological Station at Douglas Lake, Michigan. Additionally, he supervised nine Ph.D. graduate students, some of whom, such as Harry D. Thiers and Orson K. Miller, would become recognized mycologists in their own right.

During the course of 57 years of field work, Smith accumulated over 100,000 collections of fungal samples, and an extensive library of photographs. Today these are located in the University of Michigan Herbarium.

== High standards ==
Smith maintained high scientific standards in his publications; he once wrote

I personally feel that as mycologists we can never arrive at truly accurate generic concepts and correct names for them unless the pertinent facts are accurately stated. It is next to impossible to avoid bias in taxonomic work, but information should be "slanted" as little as possible.

Other contemporary authors that did not meet these standards would often suffer censure by Smith in book reviews or articles. For example, in a book review about a then-recent publication on wood-decay fungi, he wrote:

In a work of this type the author should have recognized his duty to give his readers and users the best of modern classifications and nomenclature. In this respect he failed completely. ...The agaric part of the work is full of contradictions based on the author's failure to consider work of the last 30 years."

Later he writes

Perhaps the best that can be said for the work editorially is that fortunately there is very little introductory material to confuse the reader."

In another article, commenting about "the current low degree of accuracy developing in the literature on hallucinogenic mushrooms generally", Smith pointed out numerous errors in two current publications, such as ambiguously written text, mistakes in citations, lack of scientific rigor in presenting arguments, unreliability of data due to inadequate sampling procedures, and inadequate searches of available literature. Smith would soon collaborate with one of these authors in a publication the next year.

== Publications ==
Smith published nearly 200 articles and books about fungi, including many books as monographs or various genera of higher fungi. He also wrote for the casual mushroom enthusiast; in particular, his field guide The Mushroom Hunter's Field Guide garnered several excellent reviews and sold over 100,000 copies.

Popular books

- Common Edible and Poisonous Mushrooms of Southeastern Michigan. (1938)
- Mushrooms in Their Natural Habitats. (1950?)
- Puffballs and Their Allies in Michigan. (1951)
- The Mushroom Hunter's Field Guide. (1958, 1963)
- Keys to Genera of Higher Fungi. (1964, with R.L. Shaffer)
- How to Know the Non-Gilled Fleshy Fungi. (1973, 1981, with Helen and Nancy Smith)
- A Field Guide to Western Mushrooms. (1975)
- How to Know the Gilled Fungi. (1979, with Helen and Nancy Smith)
- The Veiled Species of Hebeloma in the Western United States. (1984. with Vera Stucky Evenson and Duane H. Mitchel)
- A Field Guide to Southern Mushrooms. (1985, with Helen Smith)

Monographs

- North American Species of Mycena. (1947)
- North American Species of Hygrophorus. (1963, with L.R. Hesler)
- A Monograph on the Genus Galerina Earle. (1964, with R. Singer)
- Contribution Toward a Monograph of North American Species of Suillus. (1964, with H.D. Thiers)
- North American Species of Crepidotus. (1965, with Hesler)
- The North American Species of Pholiota. (1968, with Hesler)
- The Boletes of Michigan. (1971, with H.D. Thiers)
- The North American Species of Psathyrella. (1972)
- North American Species of Lactarius. (1979, with Hesler)
- The Veiled Species of Hebeloma in the Western United States. (1985, with V.S. Evenson and D. H. Mitchel)

Selected journal articles

- Singer R, Smith AH (1958). "Mycological investigations on teonanácatl, the Mexican hallucinogenic mushroom. Part II. A taxonomic monograph of Psilocybe, section Caerulescentes". Mycologia. 50 (2): 262–303. doi:10.2307/3756197. JSTOR 3756197.

== Honors and awards ==
Several fungal taxa have been named in honor of Smith, including: Smithiogaster Wright; Smithiomyces Singer; Agaricus smithii Kerrigan; Agrocybe smithii; Alpova alexsmithii Trappe (now Rhizopogon alexsmithii); Amanita smithiana Bas; Boletopsis smithii K.A.Harrison; Boletus smithii Thiers; and Astraeus smithii.

- 1967 – North American Mycological Association award for contributions to amateur mycology
- 1969 – Certificate of Merit – Botanical Society of America
- 1982 – "Distinguished Mycologist" – Mycological Society of America
