= Harry D. Thiers =

American mycologist

- Born: January 22, 1919; Fort McKavett, Texas
- Died: August 8, 2000 (aged 81); Ohio
- Education: Schreiner University (B.A.); University of Texas at Austin (M.S.); University of Michigan (Ph.D.)
- Known for: Studied and named many fungi native to North America
- Scientific career
- Fields: Mycology
- Workplaces: San Francisco State University
- Author abbrev. (botany): Thiers

Harry Delbert Thiers (January 22, 1919, in Fort McKavett, Texas – August 8, 2000, in Ohio) was an American mycologist who studied and named many fungi native to North America, particularly California. Thiers taught mycology at San Francisco State University. He comprehensively revised and expanded on the North American collection of boletes and named many new species.

Species authored by Thiers include the boletes Suillellus amygdalinus, Boletus barrowsii, Xerocomellus dryophilus, Rubroboletus pulcherrimus, Leccinum manzanitae, and other mushrooms including Gymnopilus luteoviridis and Russula xanthoporphyrea.

The standard author abbreviation Thiers is used to indicate this person as the author when citing a botanical name.

== Legacy ==
The fungal genera of Chaetothiersia and Harrya and the species of Cortinarius thiersii were named in his honor.

Botanist and herbarium curator Barbara M. Thiers is his daughter.

=== Harry D. Thiers Herbarium ===
San Francisco State University (SFSU) established the herbarium in 1959 with the name the "San Francisco State University Herbarium". When Thiers retired in 1989 the herbarium was given its present name. Thiers and his students collected most of the early specimens. Later, Dennis E. Desjardin and his students made major contributions. The herbarium has taxonomic coverage of fleshy fungi, lichens, bryophytes, and vascular plants. Specimens were collected from North America (especially California), South America, the Hawaiian Islands, Indonesia, southeast Asia, Micronesia, and Madagascar.
