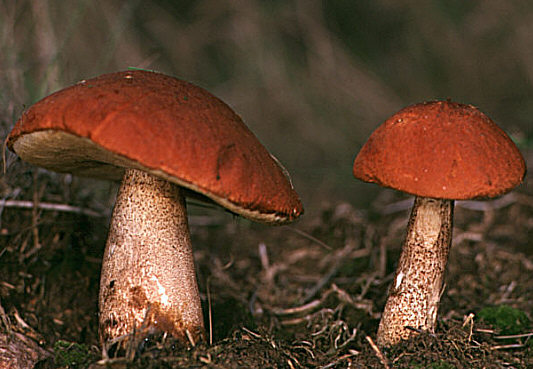
- Leccinum aurantiacum

Scientific classification
- Kingdom: Fungi
- Division: Basidiomycota
- Class: Agaricomycetes
- Order: Boletales
- Family: Boletaceae
- Genus: Leccinum; Gray

Type species
- Leccinum aurantiacum (Bull.) Gray (1821)

Synonyms
- List: Krombholzia P.Karst. (1881); Krombholziella Maire (1937); Rossbeevera T. Lebel & Orihara [as 'Rosbeeva'], in Lebel, Orihara & Maekawa (2012); Trachypus Bataille (1908)

= Leccinum =

Genus of fungi

Leccinum is a genus of fungi in the family Boletaceae. It was the name given first to a series of fungi within the genus Boletus, then erected as a new genus last century. Their main distinguishing feature is the small, rigid projections (scabers) that give a rough texture to their stalks. The genus name was coined from the Italian Leccino, for a type of rough-stemmed bolete. The genus has a widespread distribution, especially in north temperate regions, and contains about 135 species.

== Description ==
Fruit bodies of Leccinum species have a slender stipe that is ornamented lengthwise with brown to black, scab-like scales on the surface. The stipe itself is colored white or cream and usually longer than the diameter of the cap. When injured, the stipe either remains unchanged in color or stains blue or red. The hymenophore is colored yellow or off-white, consists of thin and ventricose tubes that are longer than the thickness of the cap, and has small pores. The basidiospores are long and smooth as compared to other mushrooms.

The European species of Leccinum can be identified by a scaled stipe with pale brown, white, or yellow spores. Additionally, if a hymenium is present, it usually contains yellow-tinted pigments.

== Ecology and habitat ==
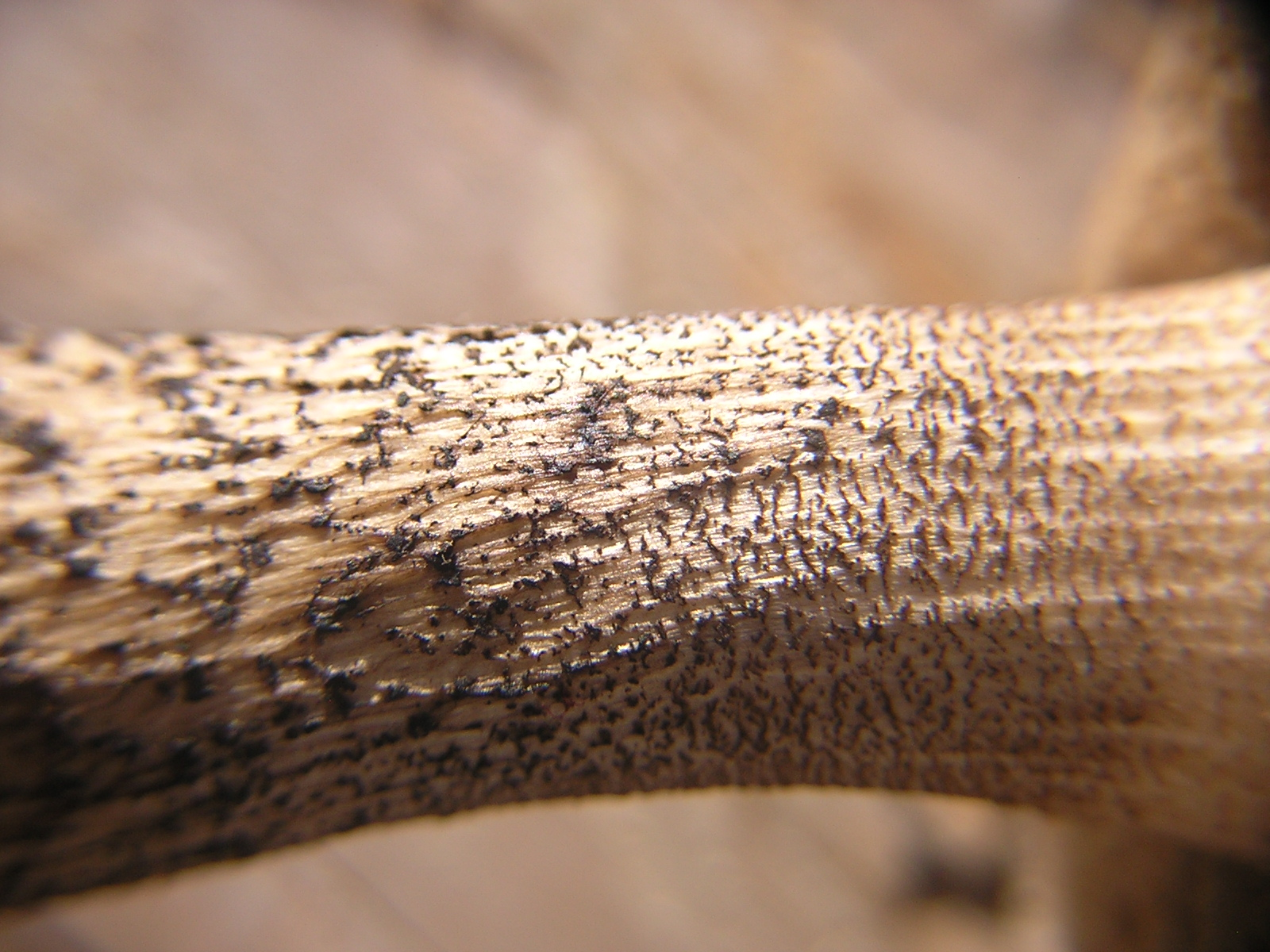
Stem of a Leccinum mushroom, showing the distinctive scabers

The mushrooms of the Leccinum genus are found worldwide, on every continent except Antarctica. The genus was first proposed by Gray in 1821 based on Leccinum aurantiacum and as a generic scientific name for boletes, often found in Europe and North America. Leccinum species are generally found in the woodlands of Eurasia, and North America, forming ectomycorrhizal associations with trees.

Most Leccinum species are mycorrhizal specialists, associating with trees of a single genus. For example, L. atrostipitatum associate exclusively with plants of Betula family that are colloquially known as birch trees. L. vulpinum are found only associated with the Pinaceae or pine gumtree family. Leccinum aurantiacum is an exception, however, occurring in mycorrhizal association with birch, poplar, and oak. Other species that form an exception to that rule, such as L. quercinum and L. scabrum, have been described as popular edible mushrooms in China.

Currently, the Leccinum genus comprises about 150 species, 118 of which have been identified in North America. Much of the important work in describing this genus has been carried out in Michigan, where 68 species have been described. In Central America, 12 species have been identified: 1 from Belize, 8 from Costa Rica, and 3 from Colombia.

In Europe, the Leccinum genus was originally divided into 4 sections: the 2 known sections of L. sect. Luteoscabra and L. sect. Leccinum, and the 2 newly proposed sections of L. sect. Roseoscabra and L. sect. Eximia. However, the former L. sect. Scabra has been merged to L. sect. Leccinum. Additionally, molecular phylogenetic studies have shown that species of L. sect. Luteoscabra, L. sect. Roseoscabra, and L. sect. Eximia belong to divergent monophyletic groups of Boletaceae and represent new genera. Thus, the Leccinum genus is restricted to the Leccinum section, meaning that there are 16 documented species in Europe.

In the Southern Hemisphere, 4 species of Leccinum have been reported, 1 from New Zealand and 3 from Australia. In Asia, 47 species have been identified: 6 from Malaysia, 10 from Japan, and 31 from China. Out of these 31 Chinese species, 12 have been ascertained to other genera, 8 were reported without specimen support, 11 and were reported with specimen citations. Out of these 11, only L. subleucophaeum var. minimum was unique to China. The other 10 share sufficient general morphological traits to species identified in Europe and North America to be considered the same species. However, even though the species do appear to overlap, they have evolved independently from their European and North American counterparts. Therefore, identification of the Chinese Leccinum species requires further confirmation.

== Culinary value ==
They have generally been presumed to be edible for the most part, but there are reports of poisoning after eating unidentified members of the genus in North America, even after thorough cooking. The orange- to red-capped species, including L. insigne, are suspected. Species of Leccinum often cause nausea and vomiting when consumed raw or insufficiently cooked.

== Selected species ==
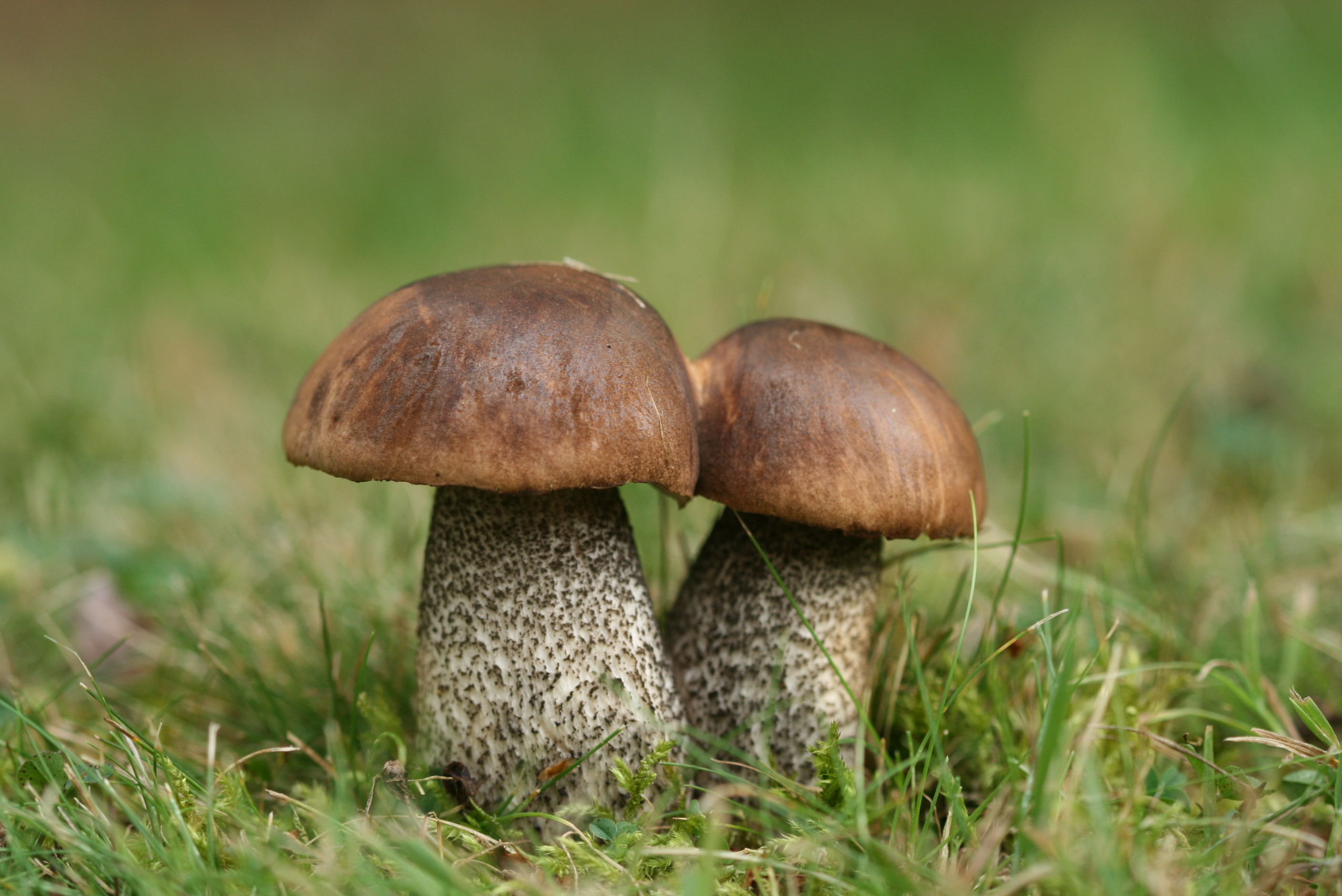
L. scabrum

There are over 130 species recognised including:

- L. aurantiacum — Red-capped scaber stalk
- L. atrostipitatum
- L. boreale — Northern roughstem
- L. cyaneobasileucum
- L. discolor
- L. duriusculum — Slate bolete
- L. glutinopallens — Slimy bolete
- L. holopus — Ghost bolete
- L. insigne — Aspen bolete
- L. intusrubens — (Malaysia)
- L. manzanitae — Manzanita bolete
- L. melaneum - Black bolete
- L. piceinum — Pine bolete
- L. ponderosum
- L. quercinum
- L. scabrum — Birch bolete
- L. subleucophaeum
- L. variicolor — Mottled bolete
- L. versipelle — Orange birch bolete
- L. violaceotinctum
- L. vulpinum — Foxy bolete
