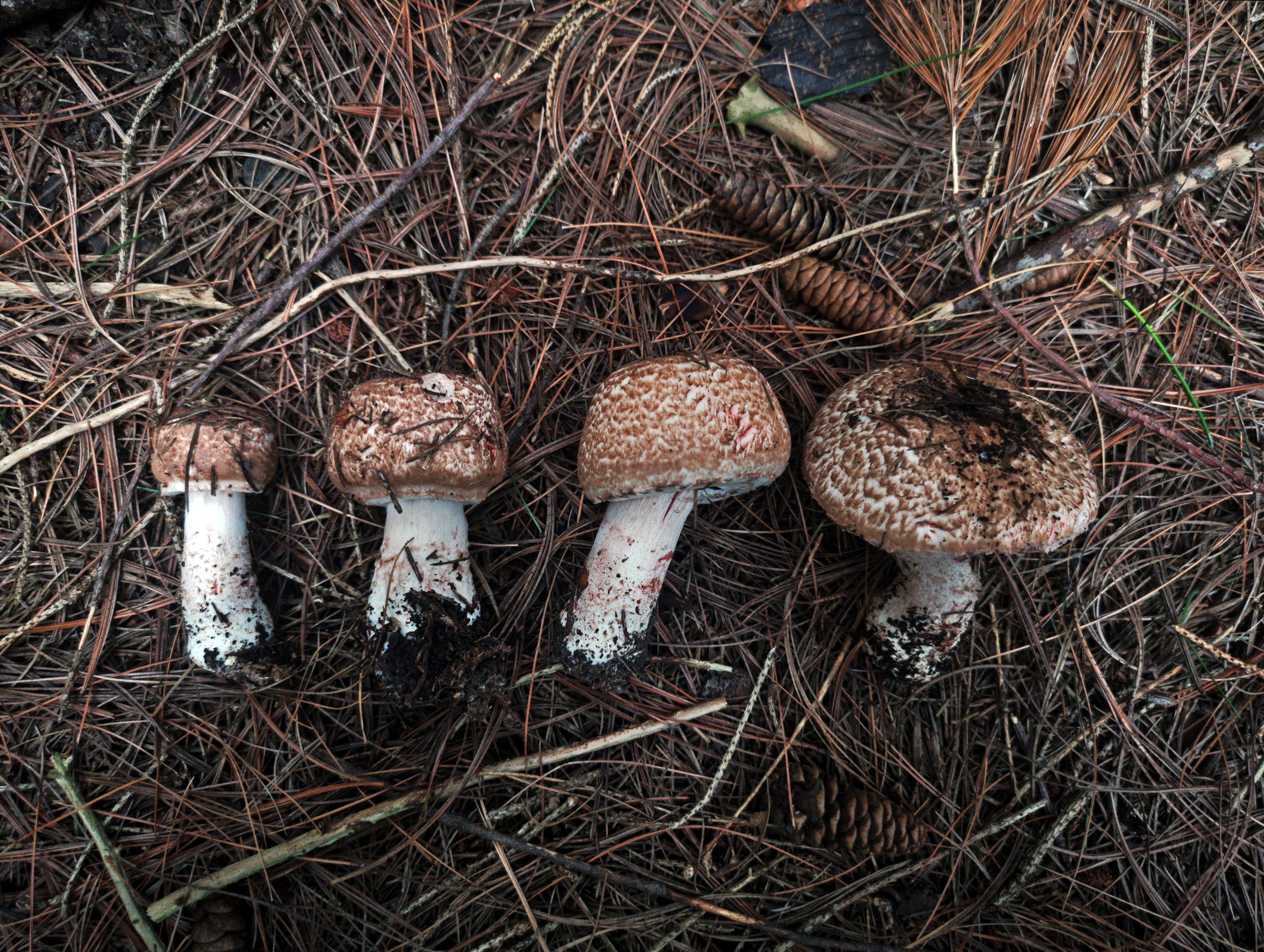

Scientific classification
- Kingdom: Fungi
- Division: Basidiomycota
- Class: Agaricomycetes
- Order: Agaricales
- Family: Agaricaceae
- Genus: Agaricus
- Species: A. benesii

Binomial name
- Agaricus benesii (Pilát) Pilát (1951)

Synonyms
- Psalliota benesii Pilát (1925)

= Agaricus benesii =

Species of fungus

Agaricus benesii is an agaric mushroom of the genus Agaricus known in English as the mull mushroom. This mushroom can be distinguished by a white cap that bruises pinkish-red when injured, a scaly lower stipe, and a conifer habitat. Similar to Agaricus californicus and A. xanthodermus, the cap discolors brown in age. A distinguishing feature of A. californicus and A. xanthodermus, however, is a thickened annulus at the margin, a phenolic odor, and a yellowing bruise, instead of red. In the case of Agaricus xanthodermus, it occurs quickly, though faintly to not at all in the case of A. californicus. Another similar species, Agaricus bernardii, also stains red and has white flesh, but differentiates on its larger bulk, a sheathing veil, briny odor, and different habitat, namely grass.

== Description ==
The cap is 4–8 cm (1.6–3.1 in) broad; it has a convex shape which, in age, becomes flat. The flesh is white, moderately thick, and firm. The odor is pungent, even though the mushroom has a mild taste. When injured, it turns a pinkish-red. The surface is white, dry, and innately fibrillose. At the margin, it is finely scaled, though it discolors into a brownish shade in age.

The stem is 5–11 cm (2.0–4.3 in) tall and 1–2 cm (0.4–0.8 in) thick. The stem extends to the enlarged base. At maturity, the stem is stuffed. The surface is white, and turns smooth at the apex, while it is finely scaled below. The partial veil is white, membranous, and two layered. The upper surface is striate, while the lower surface is composed of scaly patches, forming a small, superior annulus. The flesh is white, though it stains red quickly when injured.

The gills are initially unattached to the stem, packed close together, and are pinkish-brown; in age they become blackish-brown. Spores are 5–6 by 3–4 μm, smooth, and elliptical. The spore print is a blackish-brown color.

== Habitat ==
Found under Monterey Cypress and pines, Agaricus benesii are often in small groups or by themselves. In addition, they fruit from mid to late winter.

== See also ==
Agaricus benesii Mycological characteristics
- Gills on hymenium
- Cap is convex or flat
- Hymenium is free
- Stipe has a ring
- Spore print is brown
- Edibility is not recommended

- List of Agaricus species
