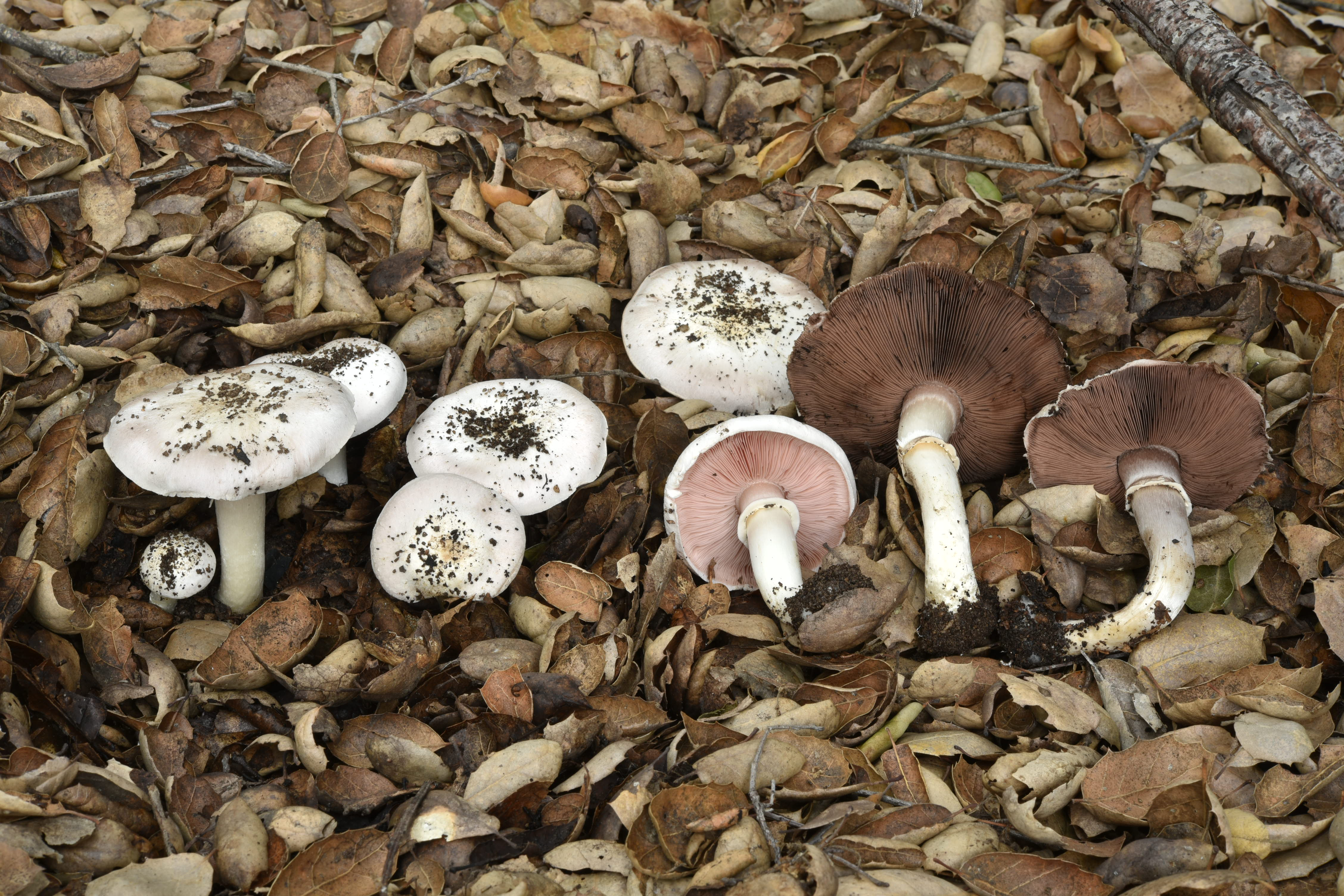

Scientific classification
- Domain: Eukaryota
- Kingdom: Fungi
- Division: Basidiomycota
- Class: Agaricomycetes
- Order: Agaricales
- Family: Agaricaceae
- Genus: Agaricus
- Species: A. californicus

Binomial name
- Agaricus californicus Peck (1895)

= Agaricus californicus =

Species of fungus

Agaricus californicus Mycological characteristics
- Gills on hymenium
- Cap is convex
- Hymenium is free
- Stipe has a ring
- Spore print is brown
- Ecology is saprotrophic
- Edibility is poisonous

Agaricus californicus, commonly known as the mock meadow mushroom, or California agaricus, is a species of fungus in the section Xanthodermati of the genus Agaricus.

The mushroom is mildly poisonous, often causing gastrointestinal upset.

== Description ==
The caps are 5–12 cm (2.0–4.7 in) wide, white, sometimes with a grayish-tan center, dry, and either unchanged or yellowing slightly when bruised. The stalk is 3–10 cm (1.2–3.9 in) long and 1–2 wide, perhaps larger at the base. It has a persistent ring. The spores are brown and smooth.

The species, like many members of Agaricus section Xanthodermati, displays a yellowing (then darker) reaction where its flesh has been damaged, although this is not always readily apparent. The cap surface turns yellow in KOH.

=== Similar species ===
Agaricus californicus resembles many other Agaricus species, including A. arvensis, A. bisporus, A. campestris, and A. cupreobrunneus, which are edible and thus require careful identification.

The yellowing reaction to bruising is more quickly apparent in A. xanthodermus (a relative in the section Xanthodermati).

== Toxicity ==
It is mildly poisonous, causing gastrointestinal upset in many individuals. The etiology of these symptoms is unclear and some individuals can eat it without experiencing symptoms, but as there is no way to tell who can eat the mushroom safely it is generally recommended against.

== See also ==
- List of Agaricus species
