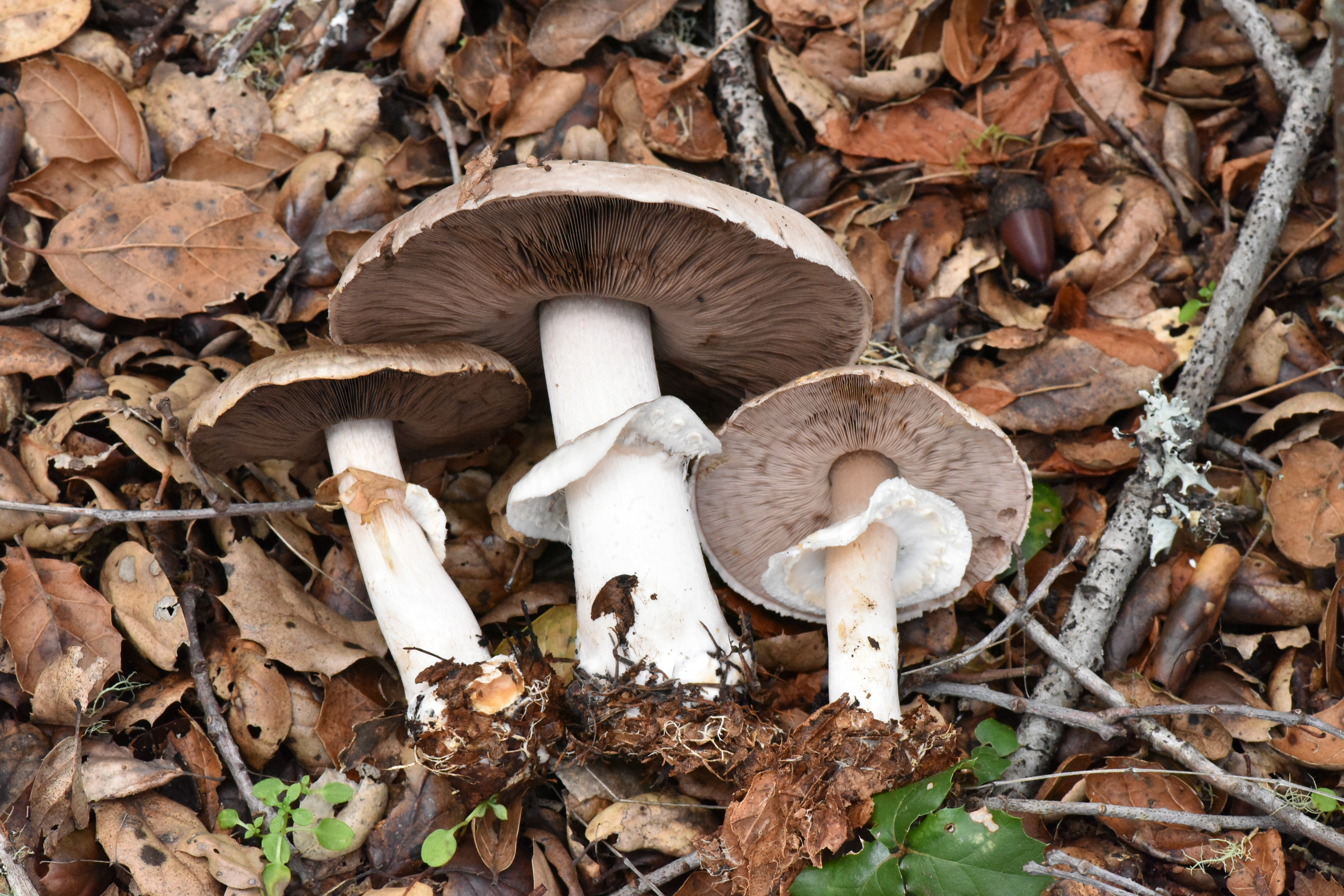
- A trio of Agaricus albolutescens

Scientific classification
- Kingdom: Fungi
- Division: Basidiomycota
- Class: Agaricomycetes
- Order: Agaricales
- Family: Agaricaceae
- Genus: Agaricus
- Species: A. albolutescens

Binomial name
- Agaricus albolutescens Zeller (1938)

= Agaricus albolutescens =

Species of fungus

Agaricus albolutescens
- Mycological characteristics
- Gills on hymenium
- Cap is convex or flat
- Hymenium is free
- Stipe has a ring
- Spore print is brown
- Ecology is saprotrophic
- Edibility is edible or can cause allergic reactions

Agaricus albolutescens, commonly known as the amber-staining agaricus, is a species of fungus. It forms a moderate-sized, stocky-statured mushroom, which bruises slowly but persistently yellow and has a pleasant odor.

== Taxonomy ==
The holotype of Agaricus albolutescens was collected at Agate Beach, Oregon, by Gertrude S. Burlingham on November 21, 1937. A. albolutescens and A. silvicola were once thought to represent a single polymorphic species or a species complex.

Albolutescens is botanical Latin for yellowish white.

== Description ==
The cap is 7–18 centimetres (3–7 inches) broad, and convex to plane. The margin is incurved then decurved, extending slightly past the gills, often with veil fragments. The surface is dry and white; when bruised, it turns tawny-brown. It also stains yellow in KOH. The context varies from 1.5 to 2 cm (1/2 to 3/4 in) thick; it is firm and turns pale-peach when cut. When the flesh is dry, its odor and taste are musty.

The lamellae (gills) are free, close, and initially pallid (typically bruising yellow when immature) then turn grayish–pinkish and finally dark chocolate-brown.

The stipe is 5–14 cm (2–5 1/2 in) long, 1.5–3 cm thick, and more or less equal except for a bulbous base. Additionally, it has a narrow, cottony central core. The surface of the apex is palled and finely striate, while the lower stipe can vary from glabrous to sparsely covered with whitish fibrils, occasionally sheathed with cottony-floccose veil remnants. Like the cap, it yellows. The partial veil is layered. The surface underneath can be cottony or fibrillose. Sometimes, it fragments, leaving scattered cottony patches over a membranous-tomentose basement layer. The annulus is superior, thin, and initially erect, then pendulous.

The spores are 6.0–7.5 x 4.0–5.0 μm, elliptical, and inequilateral in profile. Additionally, they are smooth, moderately thick-walled, and have an inconspicuous hilar appendage. Their germ pore is absent.

=== Similar species ===
The way it bruises distinguishes the species from other members of Agaricus, such as A. xanthodermus, a toxic species which has a phenolic or medicinal odor and bruises fleetingly yellow. A. albolutescens tends to discolor tawny-brown, rather than simply yellow, and the gills are chocolate-brown and free.

A. silvicola is very similar but has a less dramatic bruising reaction, more yellowish than tawny, a normal rather than stocky stature, and slightly smaller spores.

== Uses ==
The species is edible but may cause adverse reactions in some individuals.
