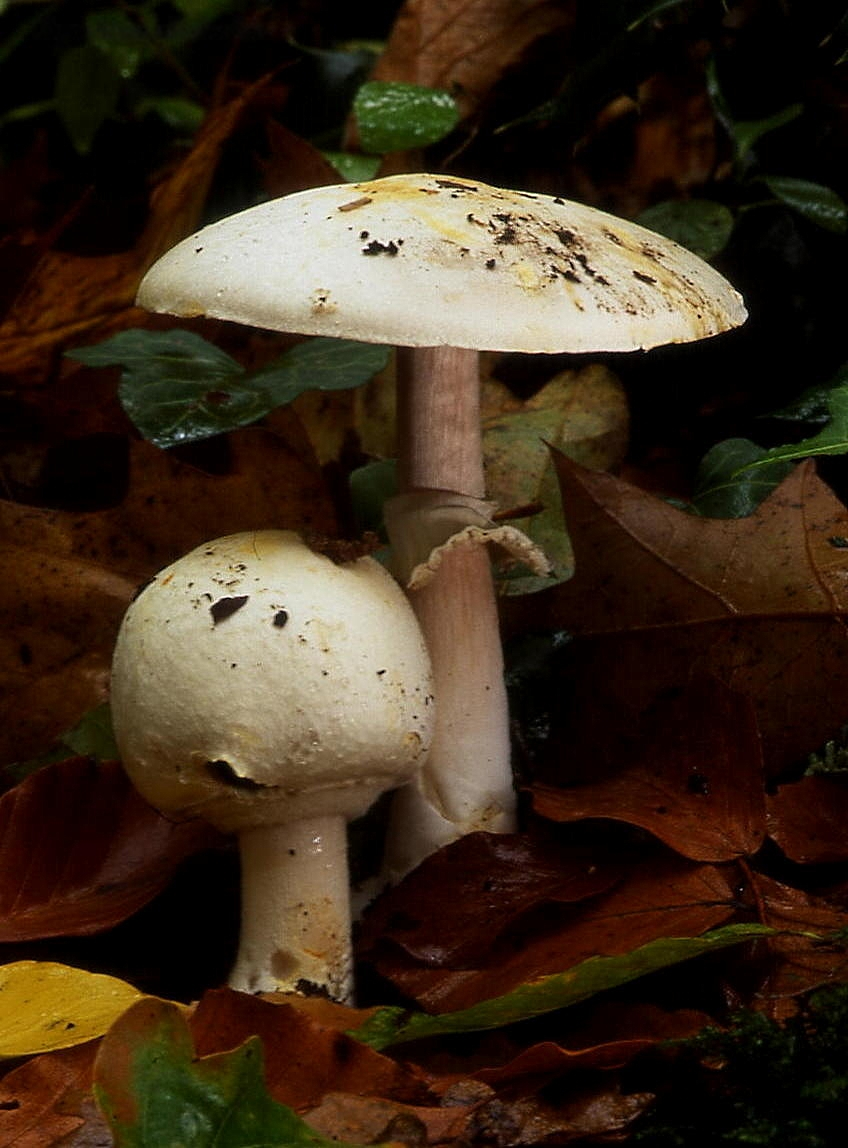

Scientific classification
- Domain: Eukaryota
- Kingdom: Fungi
- Division: Basidiomycota
- Class: Agaricomycetes
- Order: Agaricales
- Family: Agaricaceae
- Genus: Agaricus
- Species: A. silvicola

Binomial name
- Agaricus silvicola (Vittad.) Peck (1872)

= Agaricus silvicola =

Species of fungus

Agaricus silvicola Mycological characteristics
- Gills on hymenium
- Cap is convex or flat
- Hymenium is free
- Stipe has a ring
- Spore print is brown
- Ecology is saprotrophic
- Edibility is edible or can cause allergic reactions

Agaricus silvicola, also known as the wood mushroom or woodland agaricus, is a species of Agaricus mushroom related to the button mushroom.

== Taxonomy ==
Originally described as the variety Agaricus campestris var. silvicola by Carlo Vittadini in 1832, it was promoted to distinct species status by Charles Horton Peck in 1873. It is a member of Agaricus section Arvenses, a group of morphologically similar mushrooms.

Varieties with larger bases have been described as A. abruptibulbus.

== Description ==
The cap is light cream, and bruises yellow ochre when damaged. It is 5–15 cm (2–6 in) in diameter, which makes it slightly smaller than its close relative A. arvensis. The stem is 5–15 cm (2–6 in) long and usually bulbous at the base. It is much the same color as the cap, and has a fragile drooping ring. The flesh is thin, white, and smells of almond or anise.

A. silvicola, like other species in Agaricus section Arvenses, exhibits a positive Schäffer's reaction and potassium hydroxide (KOH) reaction. The spores are brown, elliptical, and smooth.

=== Similar species ===
It looks fairly similar to a young death cap (Amanita phalloides). There are also numerous similar Agaricus species:

- Agaricus abruptibulbus
- Agaricus albolutescens
- Agaricus arvensis – the horse mushroom
- Agaricus campestris – the field mushroom
- Agaricus hondensis
- Agaricus osecanus
- Agaricus semotus
- Agaricus subrutilescens
- Agaricus xanthodermus – the yellow stainer

== Distribution and habitat ==
Agaricus silvicola grows in both deciduous and coniferous woodland in Europe (including Britain) and North America. It has also been reported in South Asia, namely Bangladesh and Pakistan. Appearing in the autumn, it is rarely seen in huge numbers, usually just a few, or solitary.

== Edibility ==
It is edible and popular in Europe. It is suspected to have caused occasional adverse reactions in North America.

== See also ==
- List of Agaricus species
