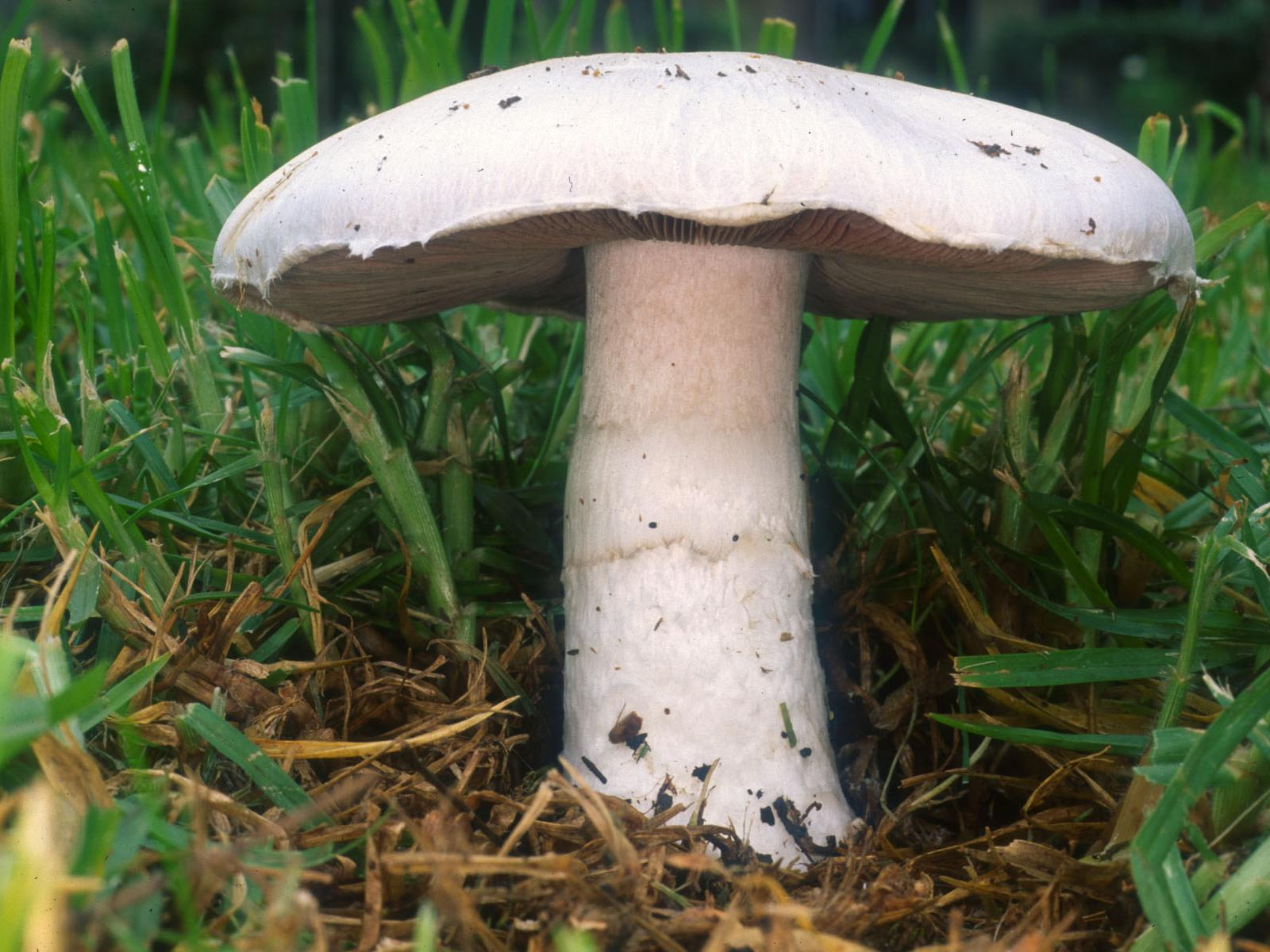

Conservation status
- Least Concern (IUCN 3.1)

Scientific classification
- Kingdom: Fungi
- Division: Basidiomycota
- Class: Agaricomycetes
- Order: Agaricales
- Family: Agaricaceae
- Genus: Agaricus
- Species: A. campestris

Binomial name
- Agaricus campestris L. (1753)

= Agaricus campestris =

Species of fungus

Agaricus campestris
- Mycological characteristics
- Gills on hymenium
- Cap is convex
- Hymenium is free
- Stipe is bare
- Spore print is brown
- Ecology is saprotrophic
- Edibility is choice

Agaricus campestris is a widely eaten gilled mushroom closely related to the cultivated A. bisporus (button mushroom). A. campestris is commonly known as the field mushroom or, in North America, meadow mushroom.

The cap is white and up to 12 centimetres (4 3/4 inches) across. The species is found in grassy areas around the world. It is considered a choice edible but resembles some poisonous species.

== Taxonomy ==
This species was originally noted and named in 1753 by Carl Linnaeus as Agaricus campestris. It was placed in the genus Psalliota by Lucien Quelet in 1872. Some variants have been isolated over the years, a few of which now have species status, for example, Agaricus bernardii Quel. (1878), Agaricus bisporus (J.E. Lange) Imbach (1946), Agaricus bitorquis (Quel.) Sacc. (1887), Agaricus cappellianus Hlavacek (1987), and Agaricus silvicola (Vittad.) Peck (1872). Some were so similar they did not warrant even varietal status, while others have retained it. Agaricus campestris var. equestris (F.H.Moller) Pilat (1951) is still valid. A. campestris var. isabellinus (F.H.Moller) Pilat (1951), and A. campestris var. radicatus, are possibly still valid too.

The Latin specific epithet campestris means "of the fields". Common names given to the fungus include "meadow mushroom", "pink bottom", and "field mushroom".

An analysis of ribosomal DNA of a limited number of members of the genus showed A. campestris to be an early offshoot in the genus and sister taxon to A. cupreobrunneus.

== Description ==
The cap is white, may have fine scales, and is 3 to 12 centimetres (1 1/4 to 4 3/4 inches) in diameter; it is first hemispherical in shape before flattening out with maturity. The gills are initially pink, then red-brown and finally a dark brown, as is the spore print. The stipe is 3 to 10 cm (1 1/4 to 4 in) tall, 1–2 cm wide, predominantly white and bears a single thin ring. The taste is mild. The white flesh bruises a dingy reddish brown, as opposed to yellow in the poisonous Agaricus xanthodermus and similar species. The thick-walled, dark brown, elliptical spores measure 5.5–8 μm by 4–5 μm. Cheilocystidia are absent.

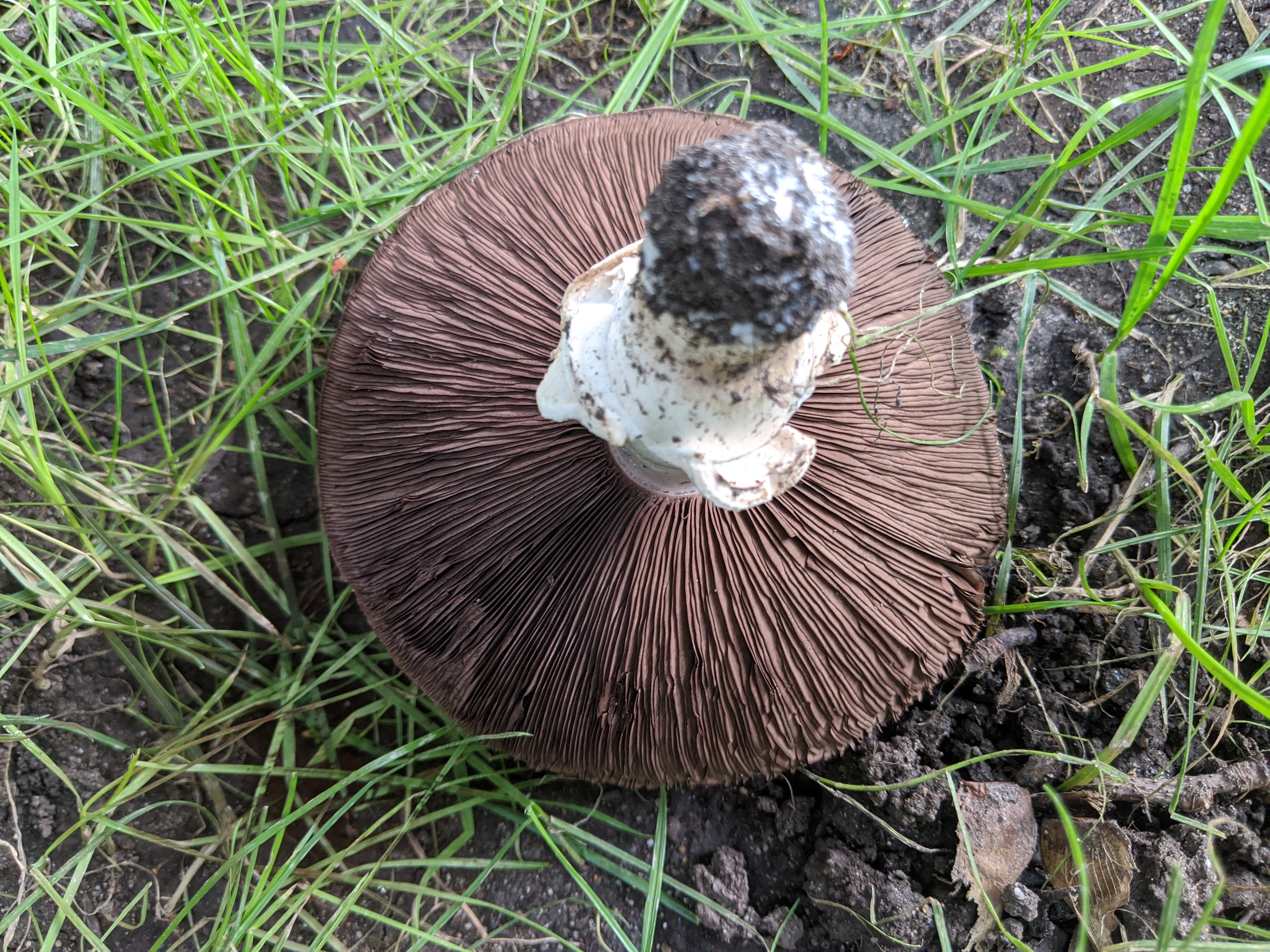
The gills

=== Similar species ===
Several species may be confused with A. campestris. The most dangerous confusion may be with the deadly Amanita virosa (a 'destroying angel') or the deadly Amanita hygroscopica (pink-gilled destroying angel). Amanita species may be distinguished from Agaricus by a volva at the base, remnants of a universal veil. Such a veil may also be seen surrounding adjacent smaller button mushrooms, if present. It's recommended to look for smaller sibling buttons nearby, and slice one of them lengthwise to examine their anatomy. They may also be distinguished by a white or off-white spore print while mushrooms in the family Agaricacea are dark brown. In the United States, the poisonous Agaricus californicus and A. hondensis may be similar. White Clitocybe species that also grow in grassy places may be toxic.

A less serious, but more common, confusion is with Agaricus xanthodermus (the yellow stainer), which causes gastrointestinal problems in many people. A. arvensis (the horse mushroom) is very similar and is an excellent edible.

It is nearly identical (except microscopically) to the edible species Agaricus andrewii and A. solidipes.

== Habitat and distribution ==
A. campestris is found in fields and grassy areas after rain from late summer onwards worldwide. It is often found on lawns in suburban areas, appearing in small groups, in fairy rings, or solitary. Owing to the demise of horse-drawn vehicles and the subsequent decrease in the number of horses on pasture, the old "white outs" of years gone by are becoming rare events. This species is rarely found in woodland.

The mushroom has been reported from Europe, Asia, northern and southern Africa, Australia, New Zealand, and North America, including Mexico.

== Uses ==
Although edible and choice, this mushroom is not commercially cultivated on account of its fast maturing and short shelf life. Care is needed to distinguish it from poisonous species. There have been cases (notably in France) in which the deadly Amanita virosa was consumed by individuals who mistook it for this species. Additionally, specimens collected from lawns could be contaminated by pesticides or other chemicals.

Culinary uses include eating it sautéed or fried, in sauces, or even sliced raw and included in salads. Older mushrooms are used in stews and soups. In flavor and texture, this mushroom is similar to the white button mushroom (A. bisporus) available in grocery stores in most Western countries.

Field mushrooms collected for cullinary use.

=== Other uses ===
In the past, slices of A. campestris were applied to scalds and burns in parts of Scotland. It has also been used for the treatment of ulcers and bed sores.

=== Bioactive properties ===
Water extracts of A. campestris have been shown to enhance the secretion of insulin, and to have insulin-like effects on glucose metabolism in vitro, although the mechanism is not understood.

== See also ==
- List of Agaricus species
