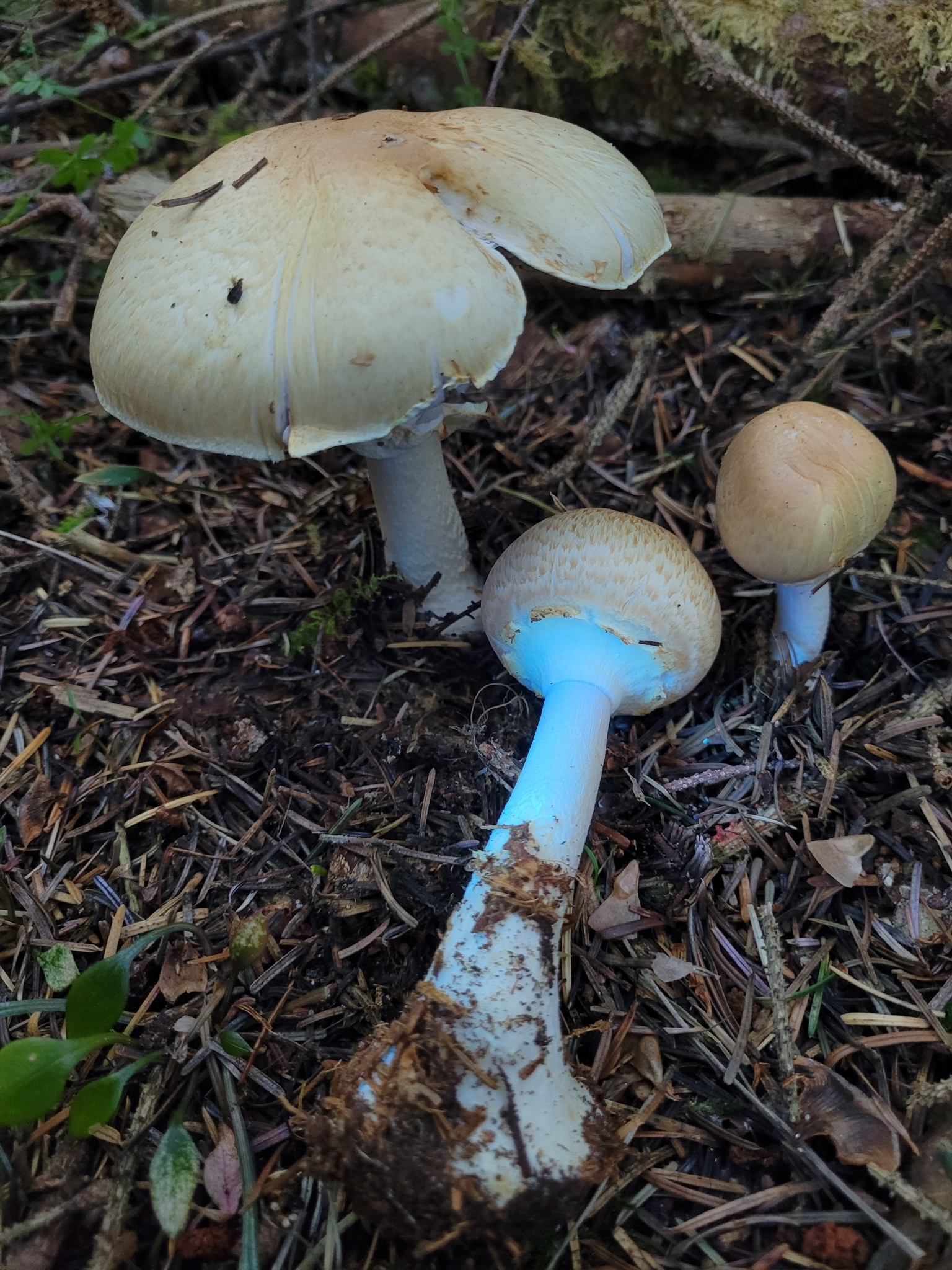

Scientific classification
- Kingdom: Fungi
- Division: Basidiomycota
- Class: Agaricomycetes
- Order: Agaricales
- Family: Agaricaceae
- Genus: Agaricus
- Species: A. smithianus

Binomial name
- Agaricus smithianus Kerrigan & L.A. Parra

Synonyms
- Agaricus smithii Kerrigan

= Agaricus smithianus =

Agaricus smithianus
- Mycological characteristics
- Gills on hymenium
- Cap is ovate or flat
- Hymenium is free
- Stipe has a ring
- Spore print is brown

Agaricus smithianus, commonly known as the golden spruce agaricus is a species of mushroom in the family Agaricaceae.

== Taxonomy ==
The species was first described in 1985 by Kerrigan as Agaricus smithii.

== Description ==
The cap is about 5–20 centimetres (2–8 in) wide and starts out ovate before becoming convex or flat. It is golden or brown in color, with a darker disc in the center. The stipe is about 5–12 cm (2–4 3/4 in) tall and 2–3 cm (3/4–1 1/4 in) wide, has a ring, and is bulbous at the base. The gills are free, starting out pale, becoming pinkish tan then brown before darkening with age. The mushroom is reported to have an almond-like odor.

=== Similar species ===
Agaricus augustus is similar in appearance, and also has an almond-like odor, but its stipe is less bulbous and the cap is scalier.

== Habitat and ecology ==
Agaricus smithianus is found under Sitka spruce in conifer forests. It is found in California and occasionally near the coast in the Pacific Northwest.
