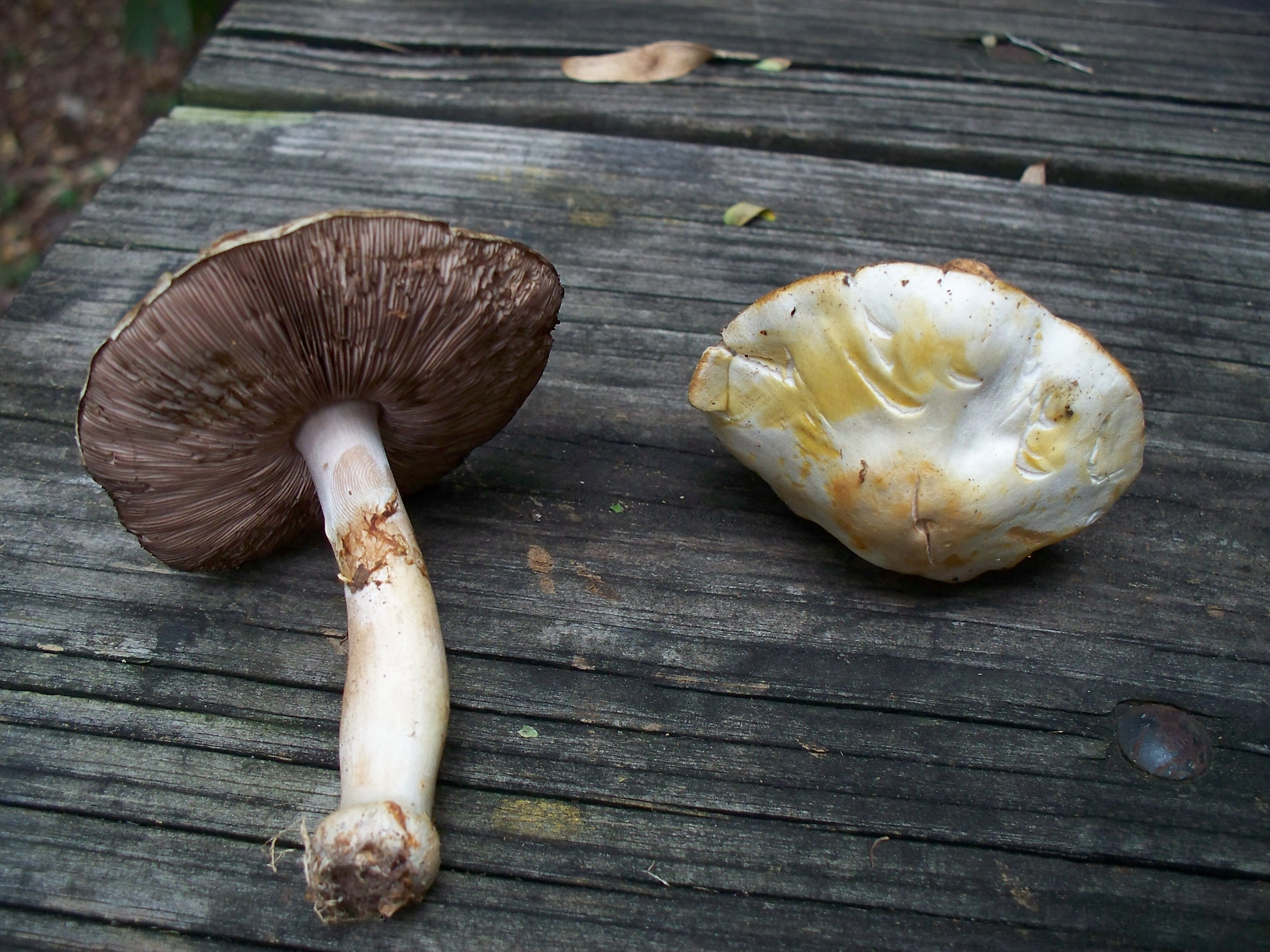

Scientific classification
- Kingdom: Fungi
- Division: Basidiomycota
- Class: Agaricomycetes
- Order: Agaricales
- Family: Agaricaceae
- Genus: Agaricus
- Species: A. abruptibulbus

Binomial name
- Agaricus abruptibulbus (Peck) Kauffmann (1905)

Synonyms
- Agaricus abruptus Peck (1900)

= Agaricus abruptibulbus =

Species of fungus

Agaricus abruptibulbus
- Mycological characteristics
- Gills on hymenium
- Cap is convex or flat
- Hymenium is free
- Stipe has a ring
- Spore print is brown
- Ecology is saprotrophic
- Edibility is unknown or edible

Agaricus abruptibulbus is a species of fungus in the genus Agaricus. It is commonly known as the abruptly-bulbous agaricus or the flat-bulb mushroom. First described by mycologist Charles Horton Peck, the mushroom is medium-sized, with a white, yellow-staining cap on a slender stipe which is bulbous on the base. The species smells slightly of anise and turns yellow when bruised or cut.

== Taxonomy ==
The species was originally named Agaricus abruptus by American mycologist Charles Horton Peck in 1900. In his 1904 publication Report of the State Botanist, he changed the name to Agaricus abruptibulbus. He explained that Elias Magnus Fries had earlier named a species in the subgenus Flammula, which he called Agaricus abruptus; the subgenus was later raised to the rank of genus, and the species was given the name Flammula abruptus. Under the transitioning nomenclatural conventions of the time, it was unclear if Agaricus abruptus would remain available for use, so Peck changed the name.

Agaricus abruptibulbus belongs to Agaricus section Arvenses, a clade within the genus Agaricus. Along with A. abruptibulbus, section Arvenses contains the species A. silvicola, A. arvensis, and formerly also A. semotus.

Some American authors consider this species to be synonymous with A. silvicola, while some in Europe have synonymized it with the similar species A. essettei. American mycologists Steve Trudell and Joseph Ammirati noted in a 2009 field guide: "The name A. abruptibulbus has been applied to forms with bulbous stipe bases, but variation in stipe shape is so great that the use of this name has been largely abandoned."

== Description ==
The cap is whitish in color and convex in shape, reaching up to 8 cm (3 1/4 in) in diameter, sometimes with an umbo. After being scratched, cut, or bruised, the cap turns yellow. The stipe is 8–12 cm (3 1/4–4 3/4 in) long by 1–3 cm (1/2–1 1/4 in) thick and bulbous at the base. A large, white annular ring is present on the stipe. The gill attachment is free, and the color is initially grayish but turns brownish after the spores have developed. Specimens smell slightly of anise or bitter almond. The spore print is brown to purple-brown. Spores are elliptical in shape, and are 6–8 by 4–5 μm.

The surface of the cap will stain yellow if a drop of dilute potassium hydroxide is applied. The species has a positive reaction to Schäffer's test, resulting in an orange color.

=== Similar species ===
Agaricus silvicola is very similar in appearance and also grows in woodlands, but it may be distinguished by the lack of an abruptly bulbous base. Agaricus arvensis has a more robust stature, lacks the bulbous base, and grows in grassy open areas like meadows and fields. It has larger spores than A. abruptibulbus, typically 7.0–9.2 by 4.4–5.5 μm.

== Distribution ==
The fungus has been reported in New York, Mississippi, Quebec, Canada, Germany, China, and India.

== Potential edibility ==
Agaricus abruptibulbus is known to bioaccumulate the toxic element cadmium—in other words, it absorbs cadmium faster than it loses it—so specimens collected in the wild often have higher concentrations of this element than the soil in which they are found. Furthermore, when cultivated in the laboratory, the presence of cadmium in the culture medium stimulates growth up to 100% in the presence of 0.5 mg cadmium per liter of nutrient medium. It is believed that the cadmium-binding ability comes from a low molecular weight metal-binding protein named cadmium-mycophosphatin.

It is otherwise, however, said by some sources to be edible.

== See also ==
- List of Agaricus species
