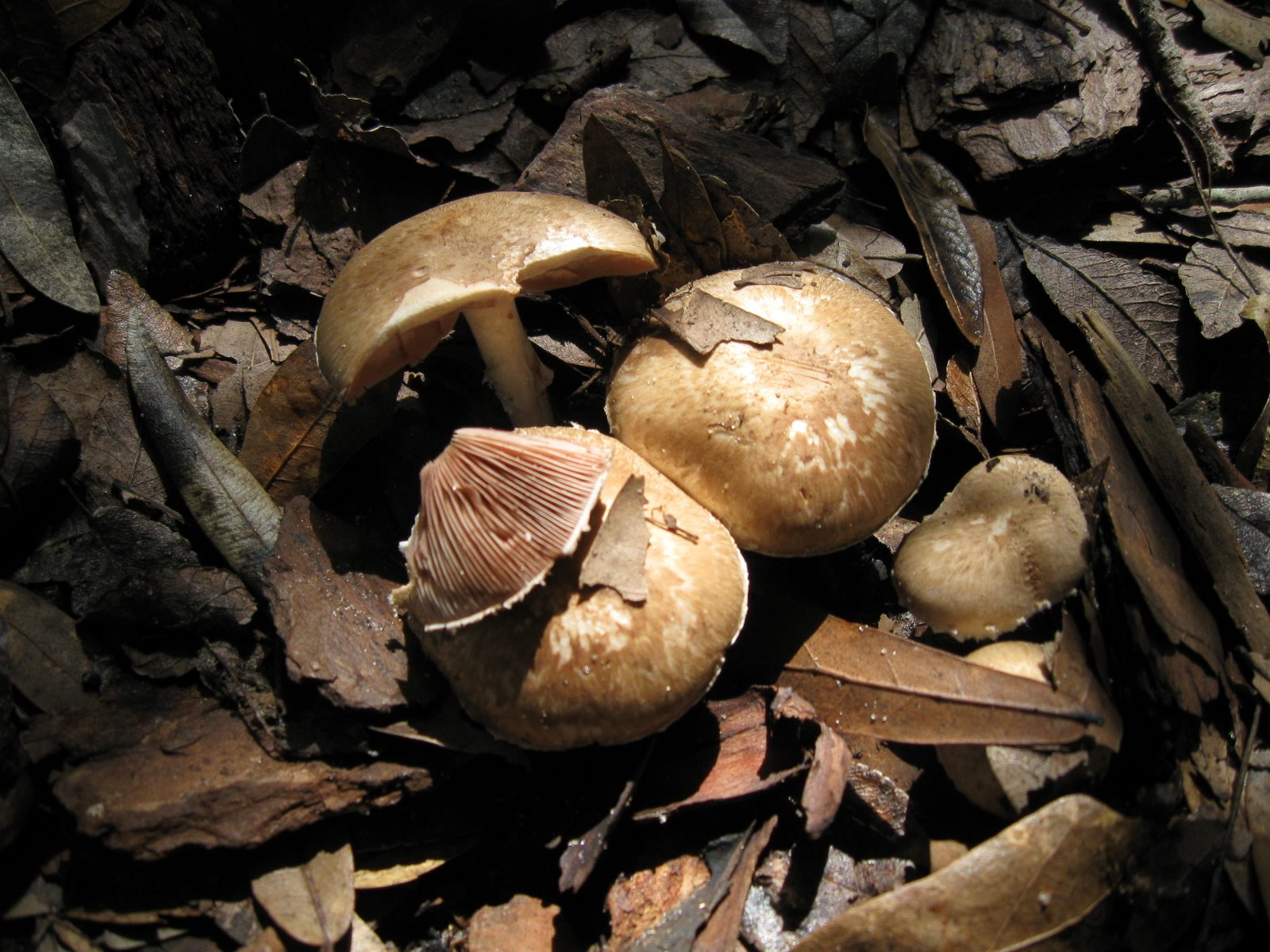

Scientific classification
- Domain: Eukaryota
- Kingdom: Fungi
- Division: Basidiomycota
- Class: Agaricomycetes
- Order: Agaricales
- Family: Agaricaceae
- Genus: Agaricus
- Species: A. semotus

Binomial name
- Agaricus semotus Fr.

= Agaricus semotus =

Species of fungus

Agaricus semotus Mycological characteristics
- Gills on hymenium
- Cap is convex or flat
- Hymenium is free
- Stipe has a ring
- Spore print is brown
- Ecology is saprotrophic
- Edibility is not recommended

Agaricus semotus is a woodland mushroom of the fungus order Agaricales. Like many of its relatives, it can be found spread throughout wooded, moist areas in the southern United States, and has been found in areas ranging from California to Florida. It is also indigenous to Great Britain and Europe. A. semotus has also been collected in New Zealand. Although various authors disagree about its edibility, its modest size prevents it from being a significant source of nutrition.

== Description ==
The cap is 2–7 cm in diameter, initially convex while flattening with age; it typically has a low umbo–a raised, conical mound in the center of the cap. The surface color can range from a lighter cream to a darker tan, with brownish scales thinning out towards the margin of the cap. The gills are free from the stalk and packed closely together, showing a pink to salmon color in youth and aging to a darker brown.

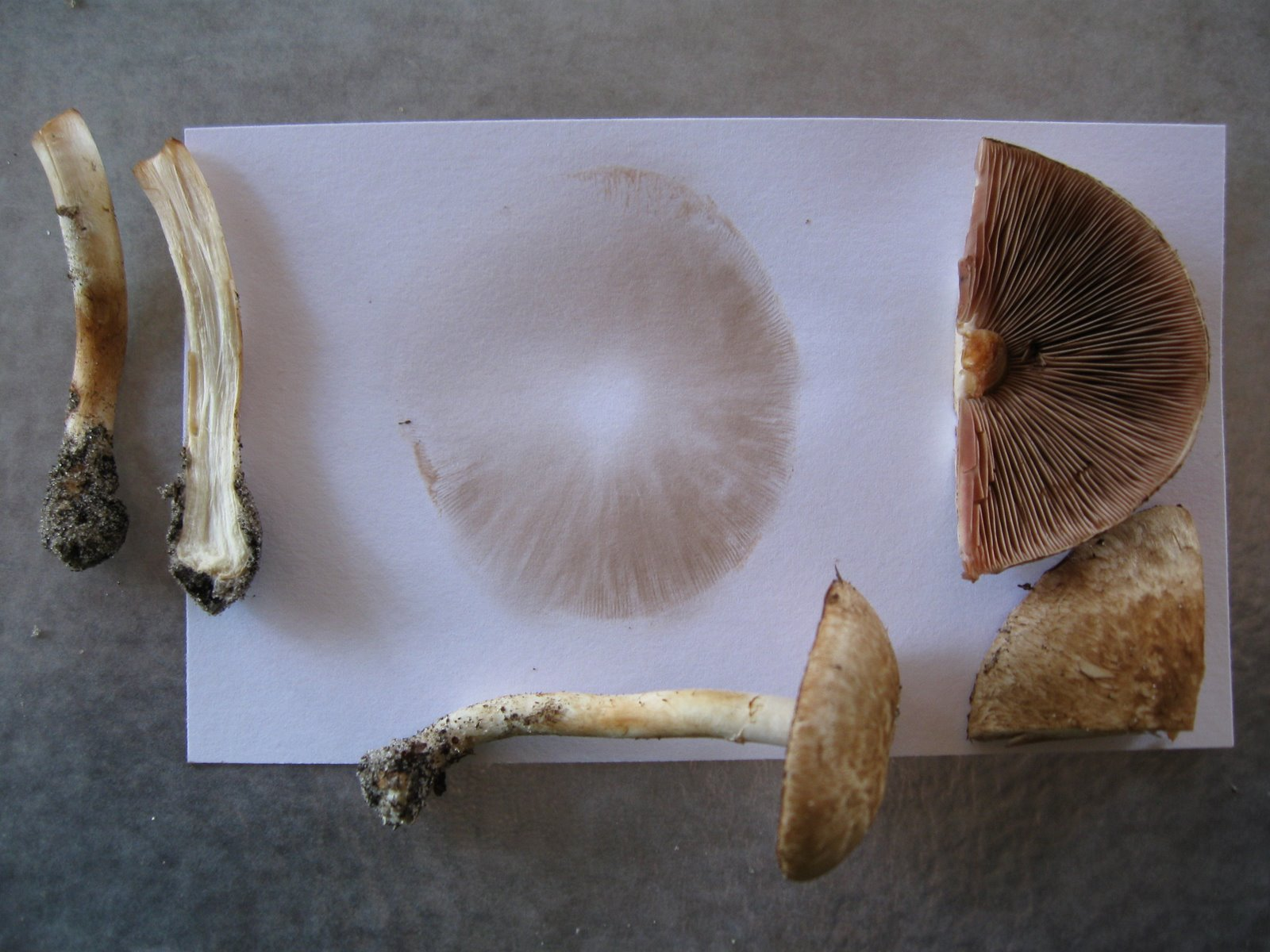
A spore print and cross-section of A. semotus

The stalk is 3–7 cm tall and 0.4–0.8 cm broad, and bruises yellow when handled. A ring or remnants thereof are often evident, while the partial veil is often absent or minutely visible along the margin of the cap. The flesh is white throughout and stains yellow when bruised. The spore print is dark brown.

The taste is said to be slightly reminiscent of anise or almond while the odor is often more distinctive.

The spores are 4.5–5.5 x 3–3.5 μm, smooth, nonamyloid, and elliptical. The basidia, the spore-bearing cells, are 4-spored, while the cystidia (relatively large non-spore producing cells typically found on the hymenium) are roughly club-shaped with thin walls.

== Edibility ==
It has been reported as edible, but others claim that it may cause gastrointestinal discomfort. Arora notes that these mushrooms are "rarely collected because of their small size".

== Phylogenetics ==
Phylogenetic analysis shows A. semotus to be closely related to a clade known as subgenus Flavoagaricus or section Arvense. This clade also includes the species A. silvicola, A. arvensis and A. abruptibulbus; these species also bruise yellow, and smell of almonds. However, analysis of additional species suggests A. semotus properly belongs to the distinct subgenus Minores, which includes the smaller relatives of the Arvense clade (and was formerly included there).

== See also ==
- List of Agaricus species
