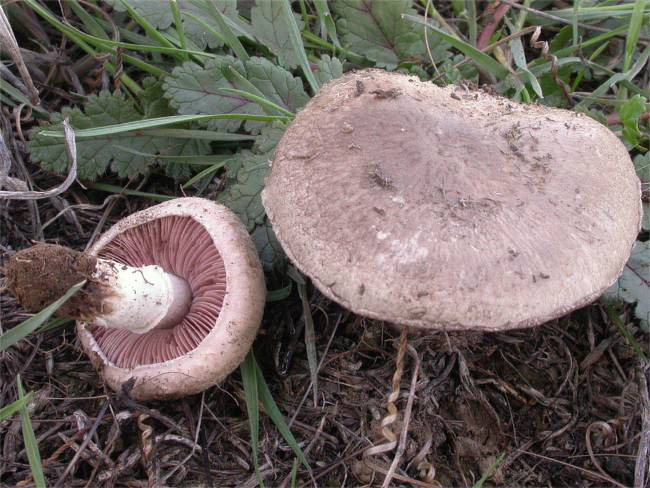
- A collection from Union City, California

Scientific classification
- Kingdom: Fungi
- Division: Basidiomycota
- Class: Agaricomycetes
- Order: Agaricales
- Family: Agaricaceae
- Genus: Agaricus
- Species: A. cupreobrunneus

Binomial name
- Agaricus cupreobrunneus (Jul.Schäffer & Steer ex F.H.Møller) Pilát (1951)

Synonyms
- Psalliota campestris var. cupreobrunnea Jul.Schäff. & Steer (1939); Psalliota campestris var. cupreobrunnea Jul.Schäff. & Steer ex F.H.Møller (1949); Psalliota cupreobrunnea Jul.Schäff. & Steer ex F.H.Møller (1950)

= Agaricus cupreobrunneus =

Species of fungus

Agaricus cupreobrunneus
- Mycological characteristics
- Gills on hymenium
- Cap is convex
- Hymenium is free
- Stipe has a ring
- Spore print is blackish-brown
- Ecology is saprotrophic
- Edibility is choice

Agaricus cupreobrunneus, commonly known as the copper mushrooom or brown field mushroom, is an edible mushroom of the genus Agaricus.

== Description ==
The brown cap is 3–10 centimetres (1–4 inches) wide with flattened reddish-brown fibrils. The white stalk is 2–7 cm (1–3 in) tall and 1–2 cm wide. The spores are dark brown, elliptical, and smooth.

=== Similar species ===
A. cupreobrunneus is similar in general appearance to a number of other Agaricus species, especially to A. campestris. It also bears strong similarities to A. argenteus, A. augustus, A. hondensis, A. porphyrocephalus, and A. rutilescens. The only potential lookalikes of A. cupreobrunneus that are poisonous are yellow- or red-staining, or occur in much different habitats.

== Distribution and habitat ==
Agaricus cupreobrunneus tends to fruit in disturbed areas and grassy places, such as lawns, pastures, and roadsides. It can fruit by itself, gregariously, or in fairy rings.

== Edibility ==
A. cupreobrunneus is edible and good. Its taste is comparable to that of A. campestris, but it is comparatively lacking in texture. A. cupreobrunneus is not currently cultivated on a widespread basis, but is commonly eaten by collectors in the areas in which it grows.

It does not contain the carcinogen agaritine, which appears in many other members of the genus Agaricus.

== See also ==
- List of Agaricus species
