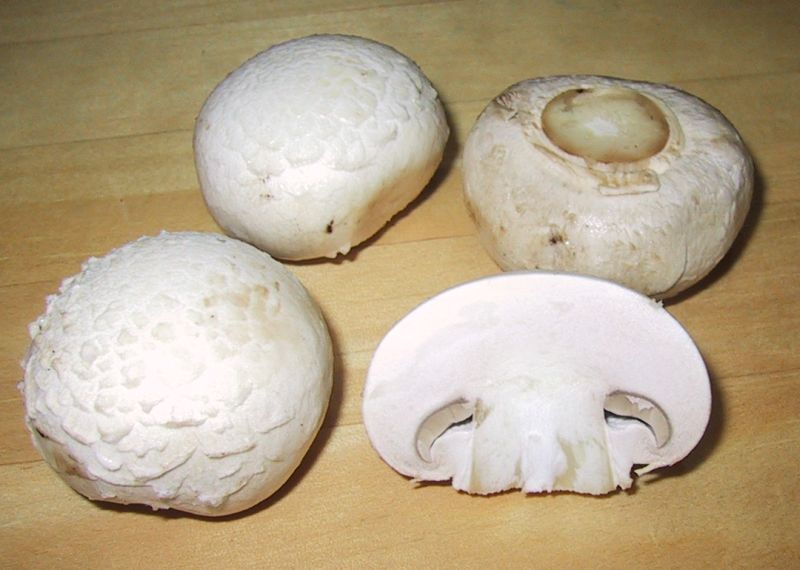

Scientific classification
- Kingdom: Fungi
- Division: Basidiomycota
- Class: Agaricomycetes
- Order: Agaricales
- Family: Agaricaceae
- Genus: Agaricus
- Species: A. bisporus

Binomial name
- Agaricus bisporus (J.E.Lange) Imbach (1946)

Synonyms
- Psalliota hortensis f. bispora J.E.Lange (1926)

= Agaricus bisporus =

Button mushroom

Species of fungus

Agaricus bisporus
- Mycological characteristics
- Gills on hymenium
- Cap is convex
- Hymenium is free
- Stipe has a ring
- Spore print is brown
- Ecology is saprotrophic
- Edibility is choice

Agaricus bisporus, the cultivated mushroom, is a basidiomycete mushroom native to grasslands in Eurasia and North America. It is cultivated in more than 70 countries and is one of the most commonly and widely consumed mushrooms in the world. It has two color states while immature – white and brown – both of which have various names, with additional names for the mature state, such as chestnut, portobello, portabellini, button, cremini, and champignon de Paris (see Names below).

Some poisonous lookalikes in the wild, such as Entoloma sinuatum, may appear similar. Amanita phalloides, or death cap, which is extremely toxic, has also been mistaken for A. bisporus. Often grows in rich soil and compost.

== Description ==
The pileus or cap of the original wild species is a pale grey-brown, with broad, flat scales on a paler background and fading toward the margins. It is first hemispherical before flattening out with maturity, typically measuring 5–10 centimetres (2–4 inches) in diameter. The narrow, crowded gills are free and initially pink, then red-brown, and finally a dark brown with a whitish edge from the cheilocystidia. The cylindrical stipe is up to 6 cm (2 1/2 in) tall by 1–2 cm (1/2–3/4 in) wide and bears a thick and narrow ring, which may be streaked on the upper side. The firm flesh is white, although it stains a pale pinkish-red on bruising.

The spore print is dark brown. The spores are oval to round and measure approximately 4.5–5.5 μm × 5–7.5 μm, and the basidia usually two-spored, although two four-spored varieties have been described from the Mojave Desert and the Mediterranean, with predominantly heterothallic and homothallic lifestyles, respectively.

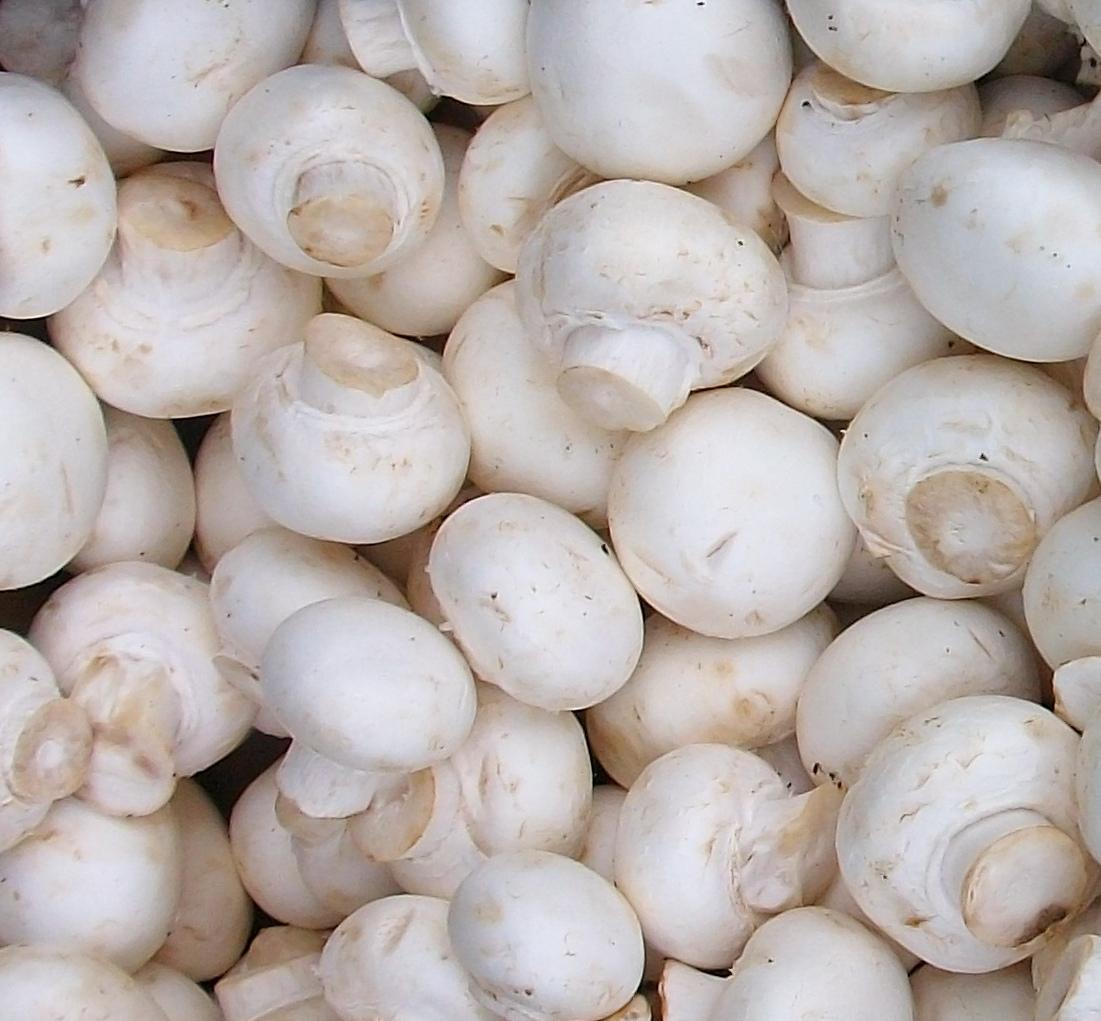
White Agaricus bisporus

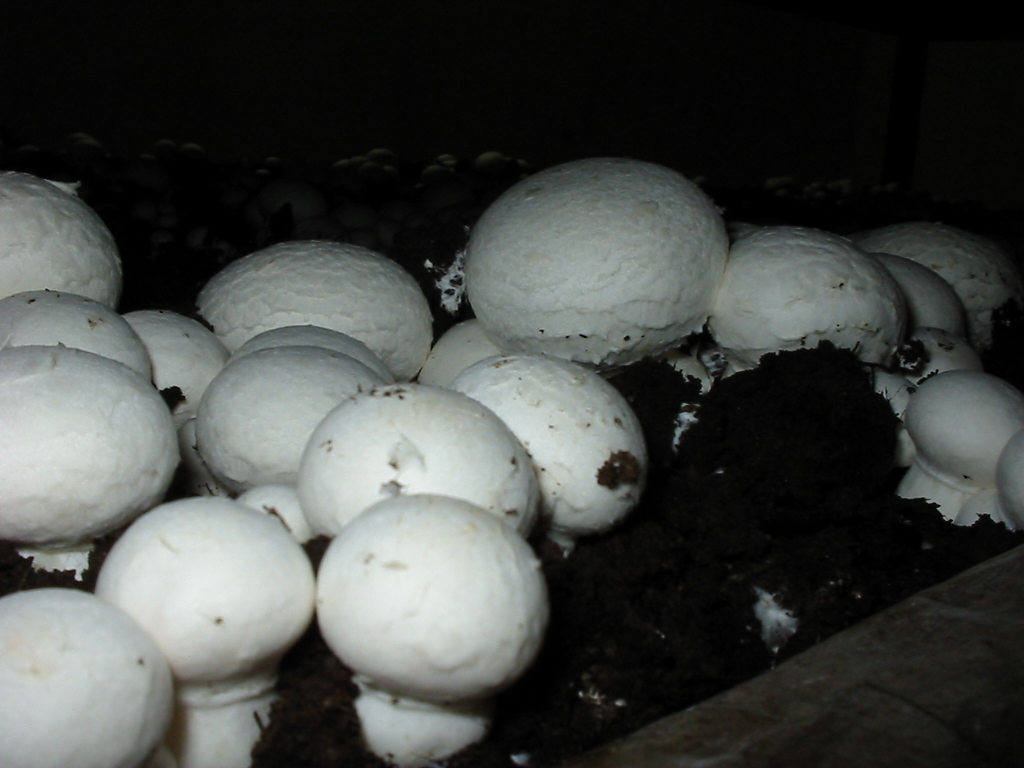
A. bisporus being cultivated

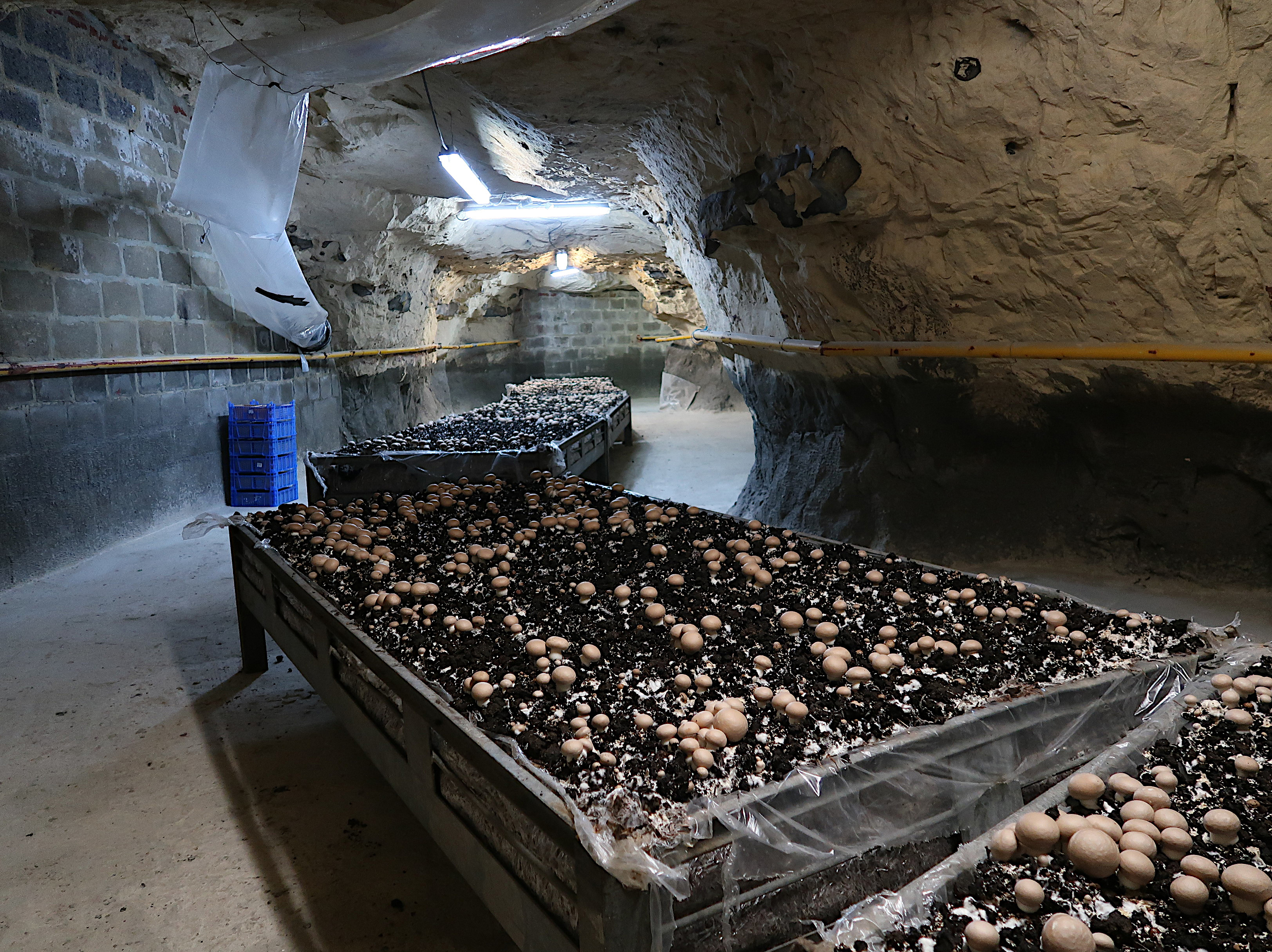
Brown variety grown in a quarry

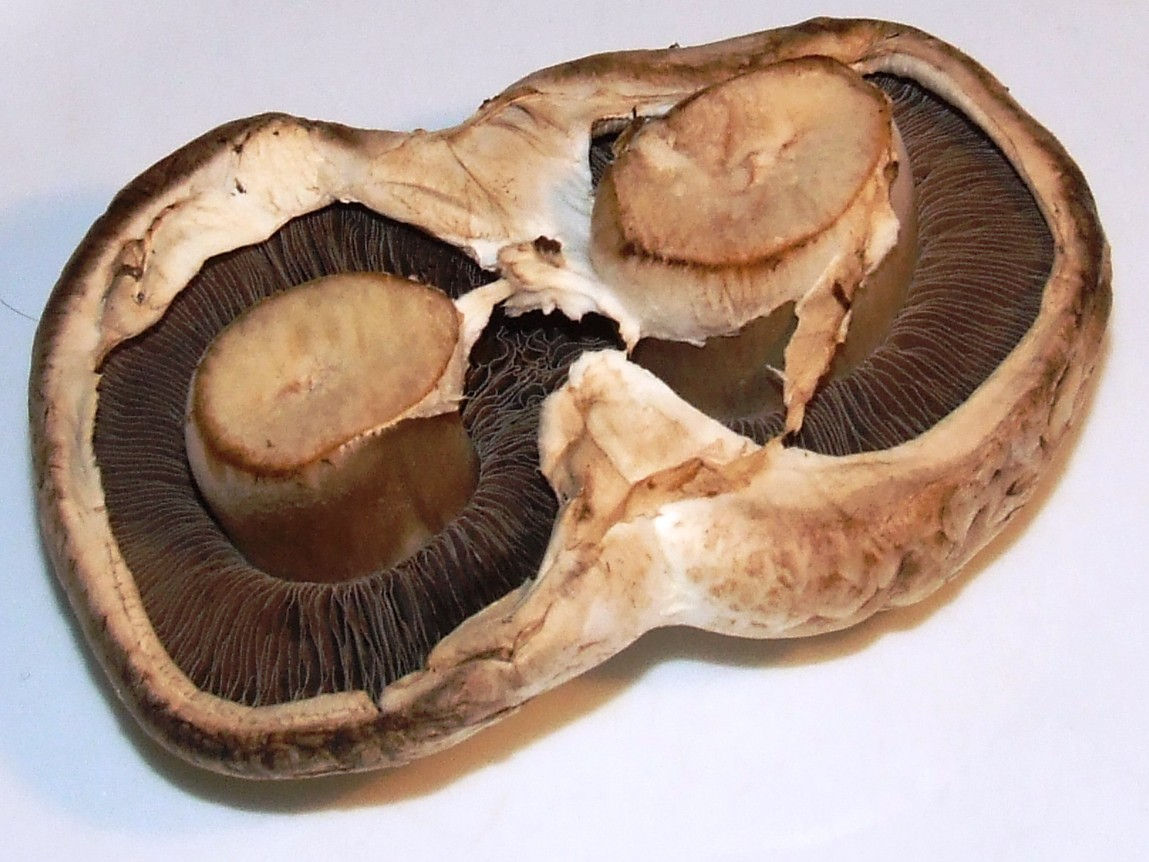
Two fused brown mushrooms

=== Similar species ===
The common mushroom could be confused with young specimens of a group of lethal mushrooms in the Amanita genus referred to as destroying angels, but the latter may be distinguished by their volva or cup at the base of the mushroom and pure white gills (as opposed to pinkish or brown of A. bisporus).

A more common and less dangerous mistake is to confuse Agaricus bisporus with A. xanthodermus, an inedible mushroom found worldwide in grassy areas. A. xanthodermus has an odor reminiscent of phenol; its flesh turns yellow when bruised. This fungus causes nausea and vomiting in some people.

The poisonous European species Entoloma sinuatum has a passing resemblance but has yellowish gills, turning pink, and lacks a ring.

== Taxonomy ==
The common mushroom has a complicated taxonomic history. It was first described by English botanist Mordecai Cubitt Cooke in his 1871 Handbook of British Fungi, as a variety (var. hortensis) of Agaricus campestris. Danish mycologist Jakob Emanuel Lange later reviewed a cultivar specimen, and dubbed it Psalliota hortensis var. bispora in 1926. In 1938, it was promoted to species status and renamed Psalliota bispora. Emil Imbach (1897–1970) imparted the current scientific name of the species, Agaricus bisporus after the genus Psalliota was renamed to Agaricus in 1946. The specific epithet bispora distinguishes the two-spored basidia from four-spored varieties.

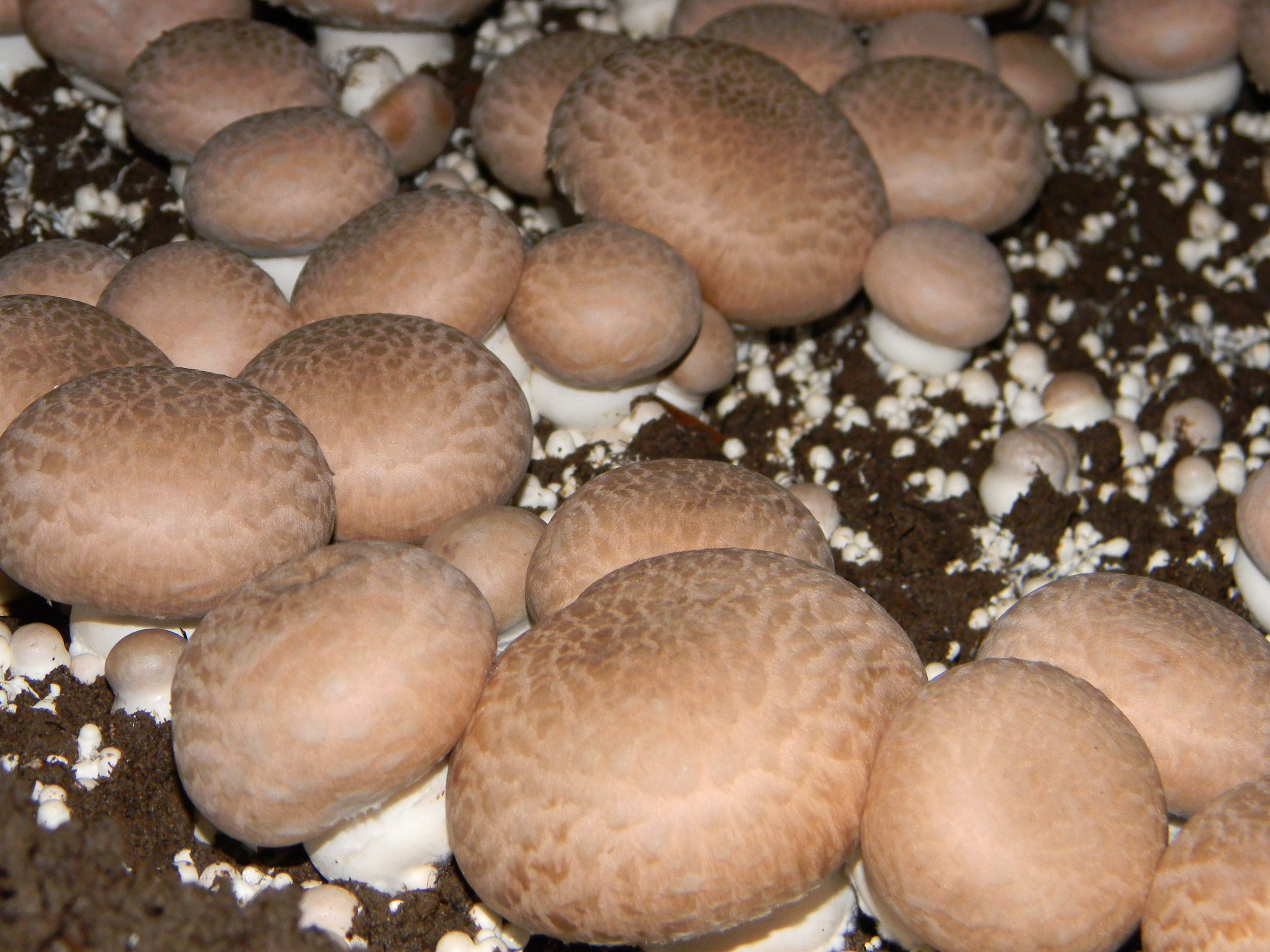
Portobello mushrooms

=== Names ===
When immature and white, this mushroom may be known as:

- common mushroom
- white mushroom
- button mushroom
- cultivated mushroom
- table mushroom
- champignon (French for mushroom) de Paris

When immature and brown, it may be known variously as:

- Swiss brown mushroom
- Roman brown mushroom
- Italian brown mushroom
- cremini (also crimini) mushroom
- chestnut mushroom (not to be confused with Pholiota adiposa)
- baby bella

When marketed in its mature state, the mushroom is brown with a cap measuring 10–15 cm (4–6 in). This form is commonly sold under the names portobello, portabella, or portobella. The etymology is disputed.

== Distribution and habitat ==
This mushroom is widespread worldwide, fruiting from autumn to winter, especially in association with cypress, rich soil, compost, and manure.

== Cultivation ==
Mushroom and truffle production – 2022
Country	Millions of tonnes
China	45.4
Japan	0.47
United States	0.32
Poland	0.26
Netherlands	0.24
World	48.3
Source: FAOSTAT of the United Nations

=== Production ===
In 2022, world production of mushrooms (including truffles) was 48 million tonnes, led by China with 94% of the total (table). Japan and the United States were secondary producers.

=== History ===
The earliest scientific description of the commercial cultivation of A. bisporus was made by French botanist Joseph Pitton de Tournefort in 1707. French agriculturist Olivier de Serres noted that transplanting mushroom mycelia would lead to the propagation of more mushrooms.

Originally, cultivation was unreliable as mushroom growers would watch for good flushes of mushrooms in fields before digging up the mycelium and replanting them in beds of composted manure or inoculating 'bricks' of compressed litter, loam, and manure. Spawn collected this way contained pathogens, and crops would be infected or not grow. In 1893, sterilized, or pure culture, spawn was discovered and produced by the Pasteur Institute in Paris for cultivation on composted horse manure.

Agaricus bisporus, white raw
Nutritional value per 100 g (3.5 oz)
- Energy: 93 kJ (22 kcal)
- Carbohydrates: 3.26 g
- Sugars: 1.98 g
- Dietary fiber: 1 g
- Fat: 0.34 g
- Protein: 3.09 g
Vitamins and minerals
Vitamins	Quantity %DV^{†}
Thiamine (B1)	7% 0.081 mg
Riboflavin (B2)	31% 0.402 mg
Niacin (B3)	23% 3.607 mg
Pantothenic acid (B5)	30% 1.497 mg
Vitamin B6	6% 0.104 mg
Folate (B9)	4% 17 μg
Vitamin B12	2% 0.04 μg
Vitamin C	2% 2.1 mg
Vitamin D	1% 0.2 μg
Minerals	Quantity %DV^{†}
Iron	3% 0.5 mg
Magnesium	2% 9 mg
Phosphorus	7% 86 mg
Potassium	11% 318 mg
Sodium	0% 3 mg
Zinc	5% 0.52 mg
- Other constituents: Quantity
- Water: 92.45 g
- Link to USDA Database entry
- ^{†}Percentages estimated using US recommendations for adults, except for potassium, which is estimated based on expert recommendation from the National Academies.

Modern commercial varieties of the common agaricus mushroom were originally light brown. The white mushroom was discovered in 1925 growing among a bed of brown mushrooms at the Keystone Mushroom Farm in Coatesville, Pennsylvania. Louis Ferdinand Lambert, the farm's owner and a mycologist by training, brought the white mushroom back to his laboratory. As with the reception of white bread, it was seen as a more attractive food item and became grown and distributed. Similar to the commercial development history of the navel orange and Red Delicious apple, cultures were grown from the mutant individuals. Most cream-colored store mushrooms marketed today are products of this 1925 chance natural mutation.

A. bisporus is cultivated in at least seventy countries worldwide.

== Nutrition ==
A. bisporus mushrooms are 92% water, 3% carbohydrates, 3% protein, and contain negligible fat.

In a reference amount of 100 g (3.5 oz), raw white mushrooms provide 93 kilojoules (22 kilocalories) of food energy and are an excellent source (20% or more of the Daily Value, DV) of the B vitamins riboflavin, niacin, and pantothenic acid. Fresh mushrooms are also a good source (10–19% DV) of the dietary minerals phosphorus and potassium.

While fresh A. bisporus only contains 0.2 micrograms (8 IU) of vitamin D per 100 g, the ergocalciferol (D_{2}) content increases substantially to 11.2 micrograms (446 IU) after exposure to UV light.

== Gallery ==
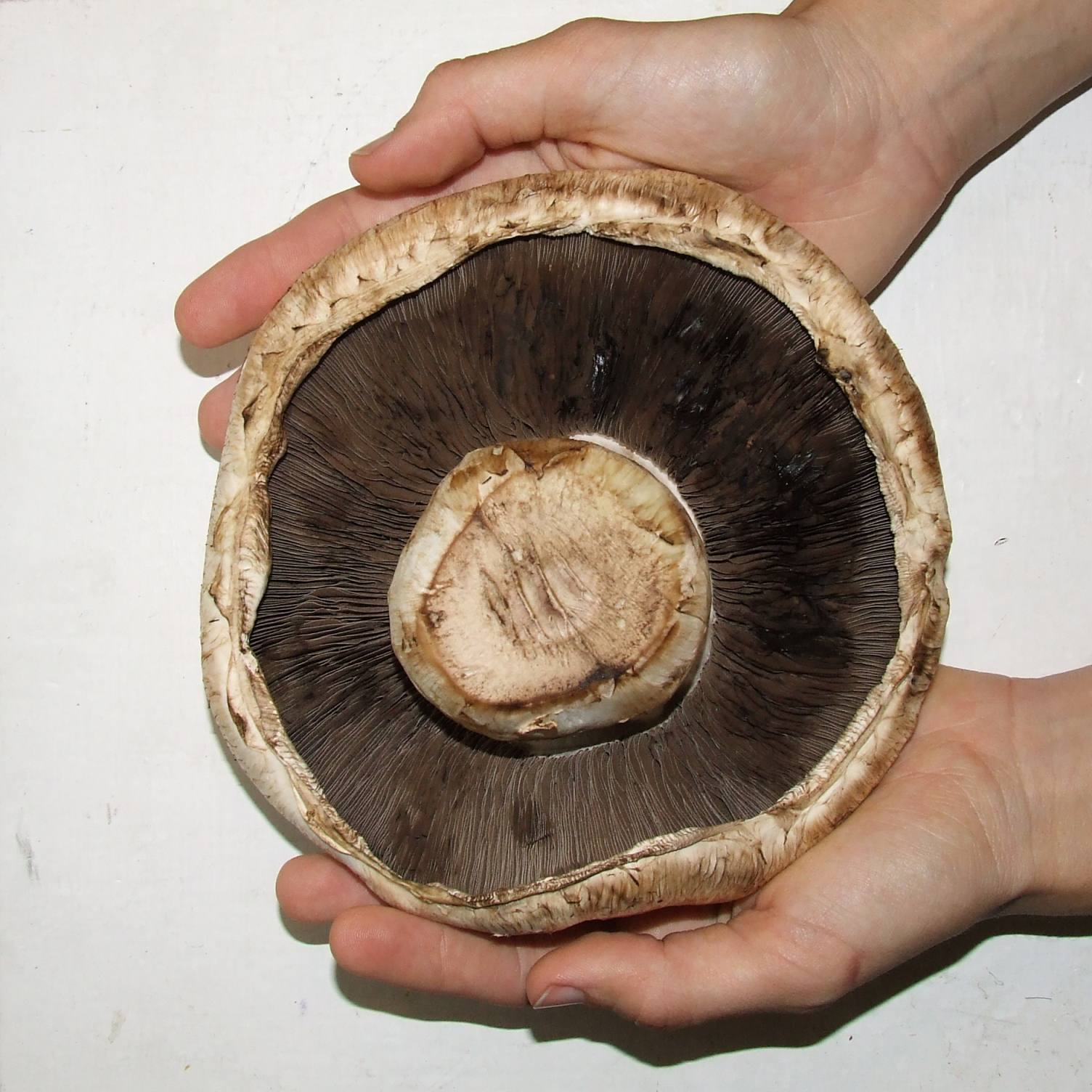
Ventral view of a portobello cultivar with a bisected stipe

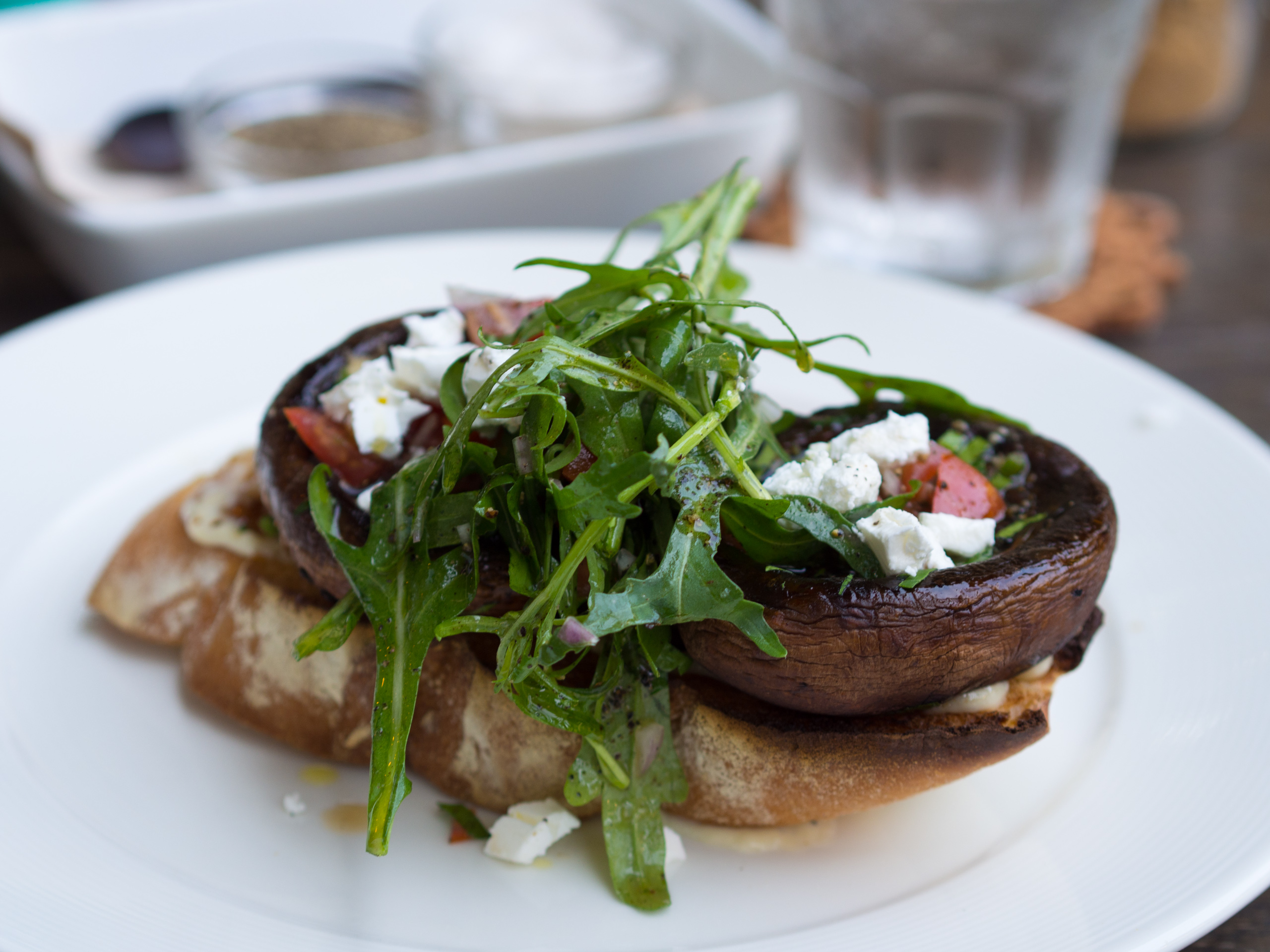
Grilled portobello, feta, and arugula (rocket) salad on a toasted baguette

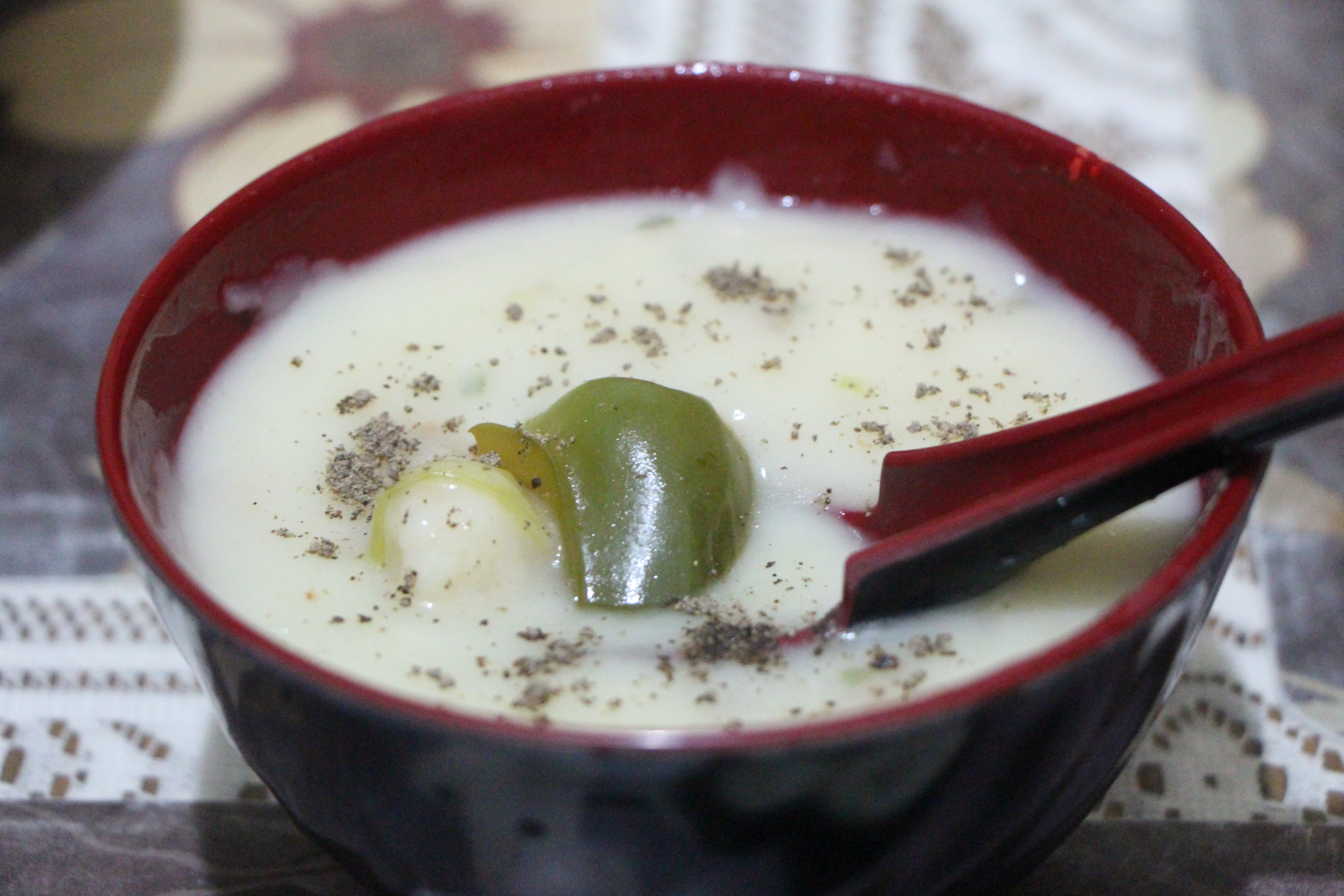
Portobello soup with capsicum (bell pepper) and a sprinkle of black pepper

== See also ==
- List of Agaricus species
