= Emil J. Imbach =

Swiss botanist and mycologist (1897–1970)

Emil J. Imbach (born 1897 - died 1970) was a Swiss botanist and mycologist.
