= Léon Gaston Genevier =

French pharmacist and botanist (1830–1880)

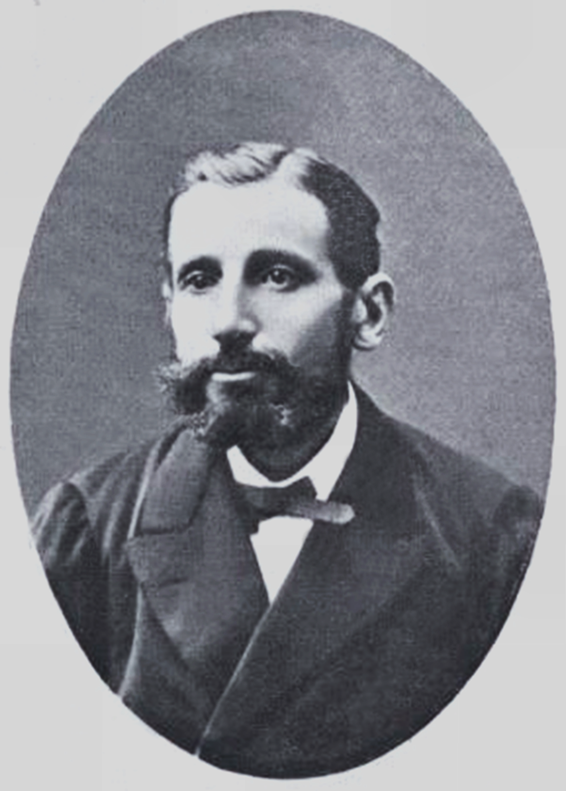
Léon Gaston Genevier

Léon Gaston Genevier (18 June 1830, in Saint-Clément-de-la-Place, near Angers – 11 July 1880, in Nantes) was a French pharmacist and botanist.

During his career, he was a practicing pharmacist in Mortagne-sur-Sèvre and Nantes. Genevier is best remembered for investigations of the genus Rubus native to the Loire basin. He was an honorary member of the Société d'études scientifiques d'Angers.

== Publications ==
- Extrait de la florule des environs de Mortagne-Sur-Sèvre (Vendée), 1866 - Extrait on local flora in the vicinity of Mortagne-sur-Sèvre.
- Essai monographique sur les Rubus du bassin de la Loire, 1869 - Monograph on Rubus found in the Loire basin.
- Etude sur les champignons consommés à Nantes sous le nom de champignon rose ou de couche (Agaricus campestris L.), 1876
- Premier supplément à l'essai monographique sur les "Rubus" du bassin de la Loire - First supplement to the monograph on Rubus of the Loire basin.
