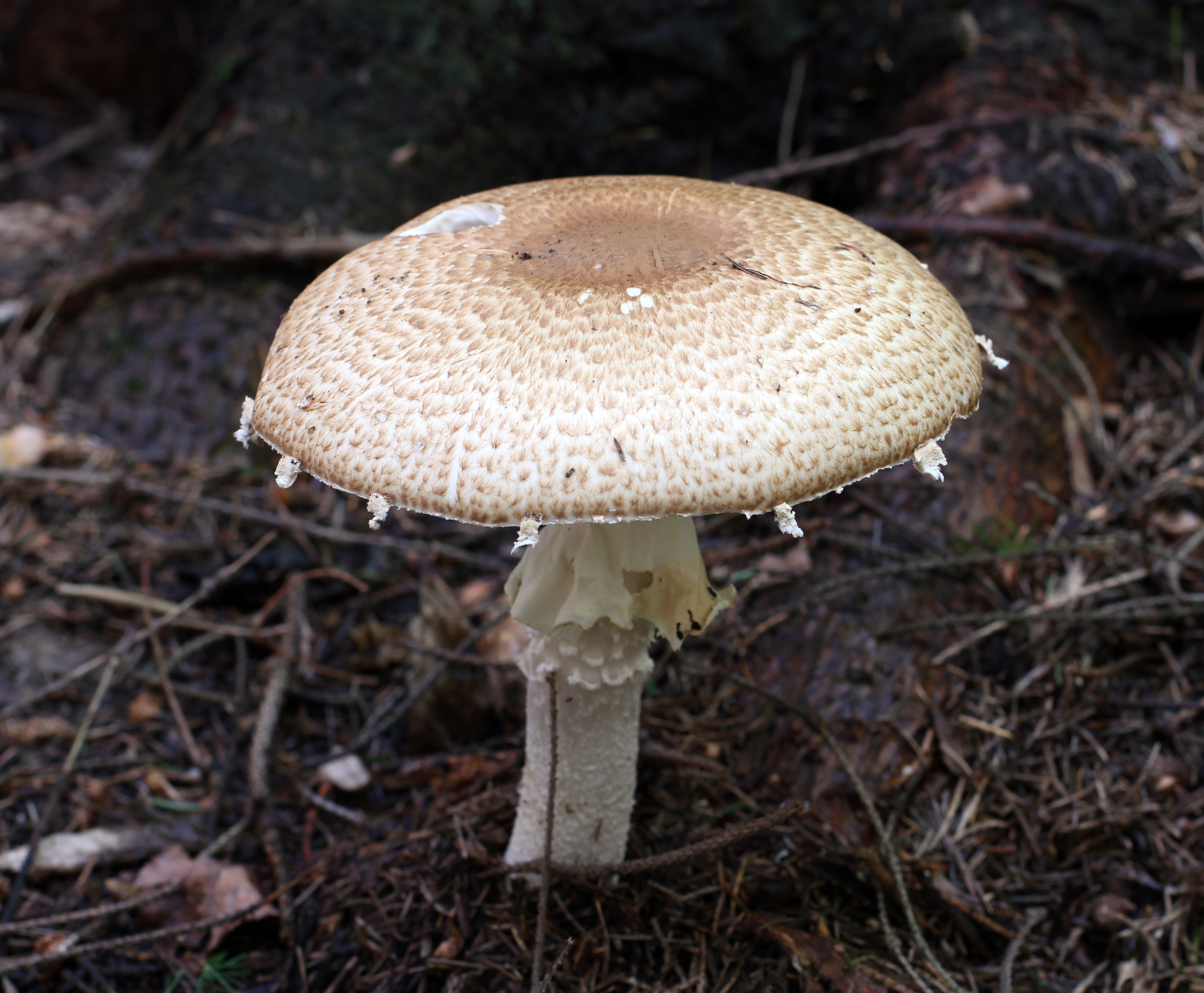

Scientific classification
- Kingdom: Fungi
- Division: Basidiomycota
- Class: Agaricomycetes
- Order: Agaricales
- Family: Agaricaceae
- Genus: Agaricus
- Species: A. augustus

Binomial name
- Agaricus augustus Fr.

Synonyms
- Psalliota augusta (Fr.) Quél. Agaricus augustus var. perrarus (Schulzer) Bon & Cappelli

= Agaricus augustus =

Species of fungus

Agaricus augustus
- Mycological characteristics
- Gills on hymenium
- Cap is convex
- Hymenium is free
- Stipe has a ring
- Spore print is brown
- Ecology is saprotrophic
- Edibility is choice

Agaricus augustus, known commonly as the prince, is a basidiomycete fungus of the genus Agaricus. It is generally edible, but bioaccumulates the metal cadmium.

== Taxonomy ==
According to Heinemann's (1978) popular division of Agaricus, A. augustus belongs to section Arvenses. The system proposed by Wasser (2002) classifies A. augustus within subgenus Flavoagaricus, section Majores, subsection Flavescentes. Moreover, there have been attempts to recognise distinct varieties, namely A. augustus var. augustus Fr., and A. augustus var. perrarus (Schulzer) Bon & Cappelli.

The specific epithet augustus is a Latin adjective meaning noble.

== Description ==
Agaricus augustus forms large and distinctive agarics. The cap shape is hemispherical during the so-called button stage, and then expands, becoming convex and finally flat, with a diameter from 8–30 cm (3–12 in). The cap cuticle is dry, and densely covered with concentrically arranged, brown-coloured scales on a white to yellow background.

The flesh is thick, firm and white and may discolour yellow when bruised. The gills are crowded and pallid at first, and turn pink then dark brown with maturity. The gills are not attached to the stem; they are free. Immature specimens bear a delicate white partial veil with darker-coloured warts, extending from the stem to the cap periphery.

The stem is clavate and 7–30 cm (3–12 in) tall, and 2–6 cm (3/4–2 1/4 in) thick. In mature specimens, the partial veil is torn and left behind as a pendulous ring adorning the stem. Above the ring, the stem is white to yellow and smooth. Below, it is covered with numerous small scales. Its flesh is thick, white and sometimes has a narrow central hollow. The stem base extends deeply into the substrate.

The mushroom's odour is strong and sweet, similar to almond extract, marzipan or maraschino cherry, due to the presence of benzaldehyde and benzyl alcohol. Its taste has been described as not distinctive. It shows a red positive Schaeffer's test reaction. The cap cuticle turns yellow when a 10% potassium hydroxide (KOH) solution is applied.

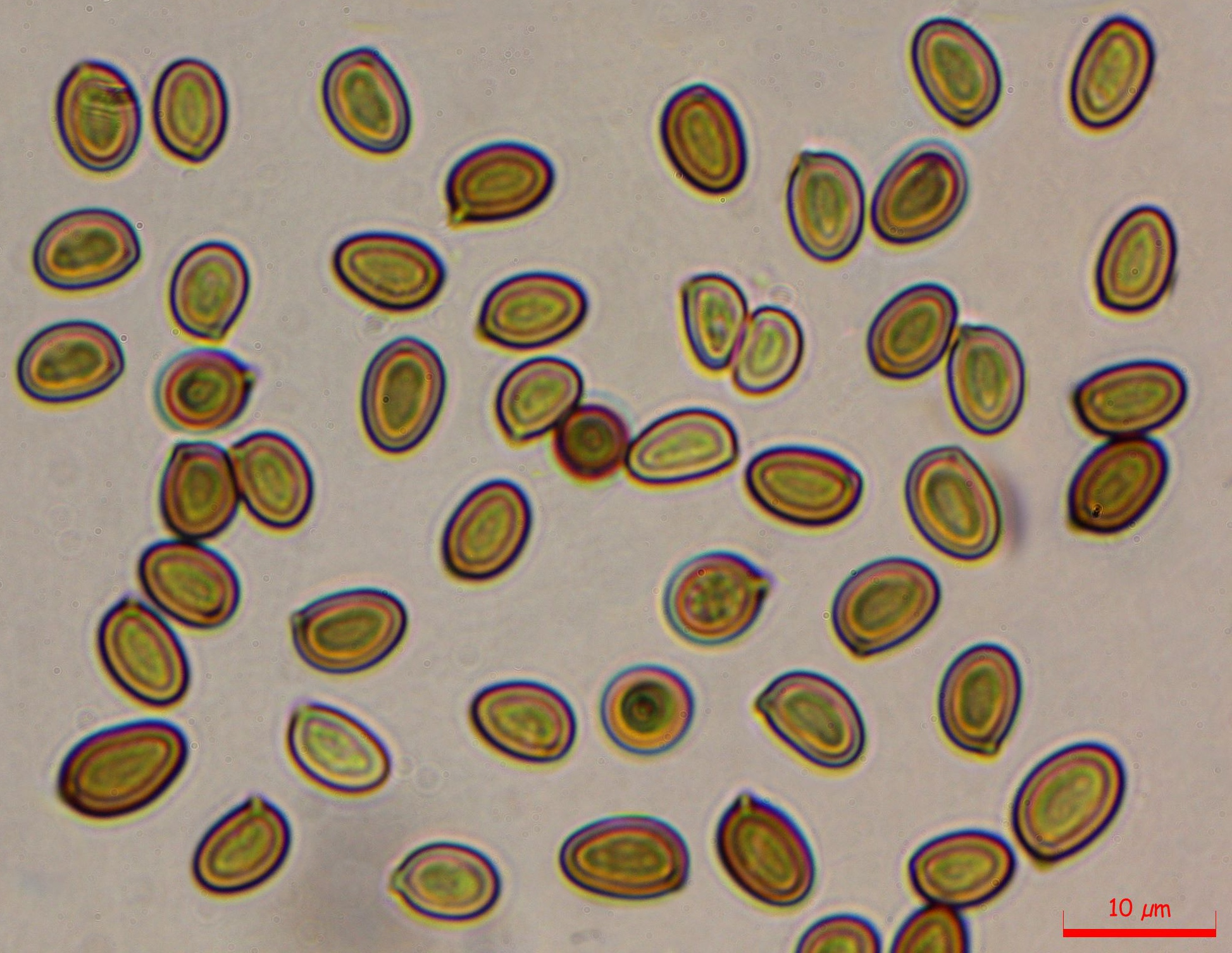
Spores 1000x

Under a microscope, the ellipsoid-shaped spores are seen characteristically large at 7–10 by 4.5–6.5 μm. The basidia are 4-spored. The spore mass is coloured chocolate-brown.

=== Similar species ===
Toxic lookalikes include Amanitas which stain yellow when bruised or emit bad odor. Another similar-looking toxic species is Agaricus moelleri. Several other members of the genus are similar. Initially reported from North America, A. subrufescens produces smaller spores, sized 6–7.5 by 4–5 μm.

== Distribution and habitat ==
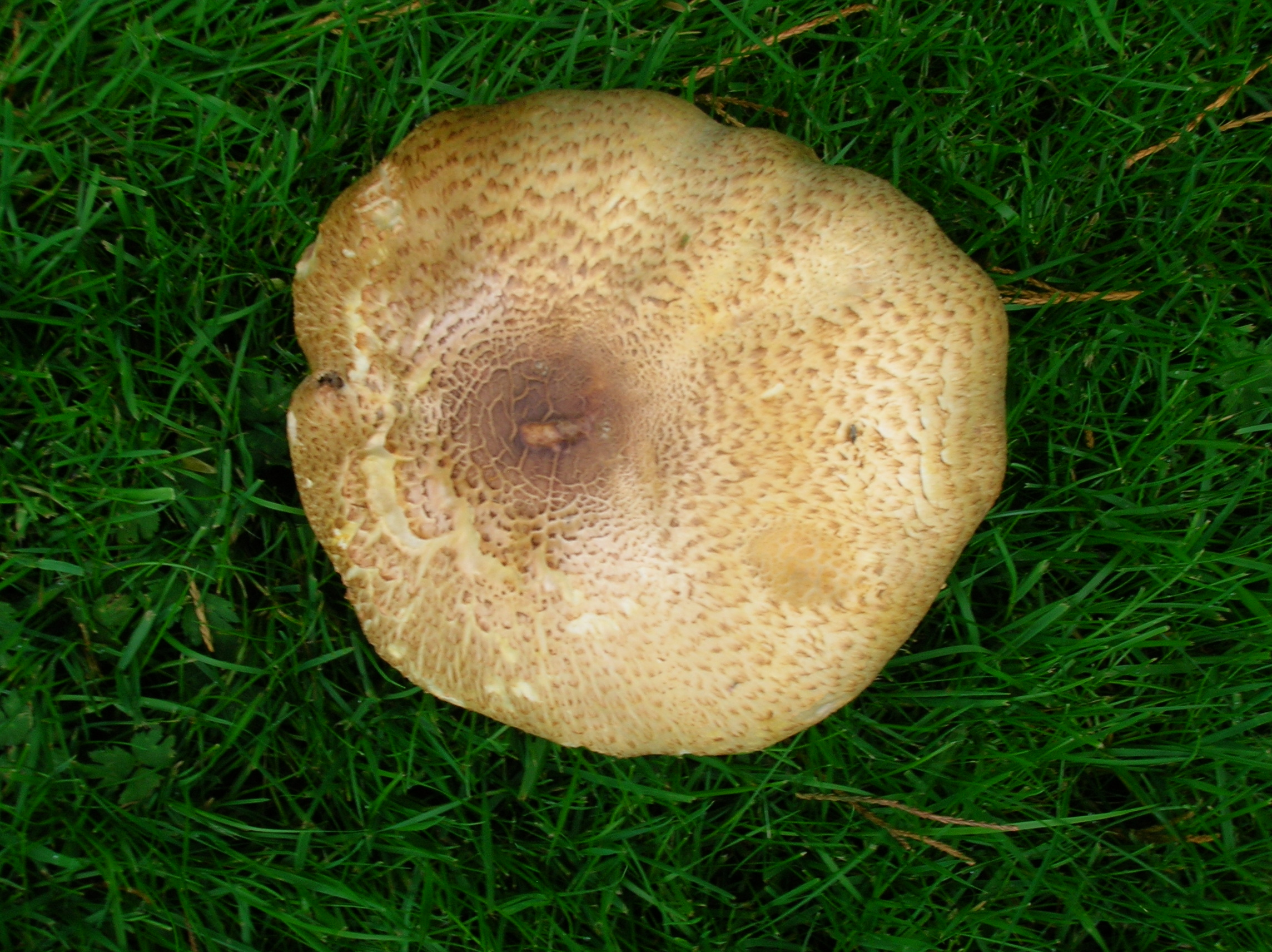
Specimen under a copper beech at Dumfries House, Ayrshire

Agaricus augustus has a widespread distribution, occurring throughout Europe, Africa, Asia, and North America. The mushroom is found in deciduous and coniferous woods and in gardens and by roadside verges. The fungus is saprotrophic and terrestrial; it acquires nutrients from decaying dead organic matter and its fruiting bodies occur on humus-rich soil. The species seems adapted to thriving near human activity, as it also emerges from disturbed ground. In Europe, the species fruits in late summer and autumn. In North America, it is found from April to December.

== Potential toxicity ==
A. augustus has been implicated in bioaccumulating the metal cadmium, with a quantity of 2.44 mg per kilogram of fresh weight as recorded in one Swiss study. The same phenomenon is true for other edible species of Agaricus, namely A. arvensis, A. macrosporus and A. silvicola, though quantities may vary greatly depending on species, which part of the fruiting body is analysed, and the level of contamination of the substrate. Specimens collected near metal smelters and urban areas have a higher cadmium content. The hymenium contains the highest concentration of metal, followed by the rest of the cap, while the lower part of the stem contains the least. It is recommended to consume only in small amounts.

== Uses ==
This mushroom is a choice edible for most people, though it is best to eat only small amounts, due to its high cadmium concentration. It is collected widely for consumption in Eurasia, Canada, the United States, and some parts of Mexico.

== See also ==
- List of Agaricus species
