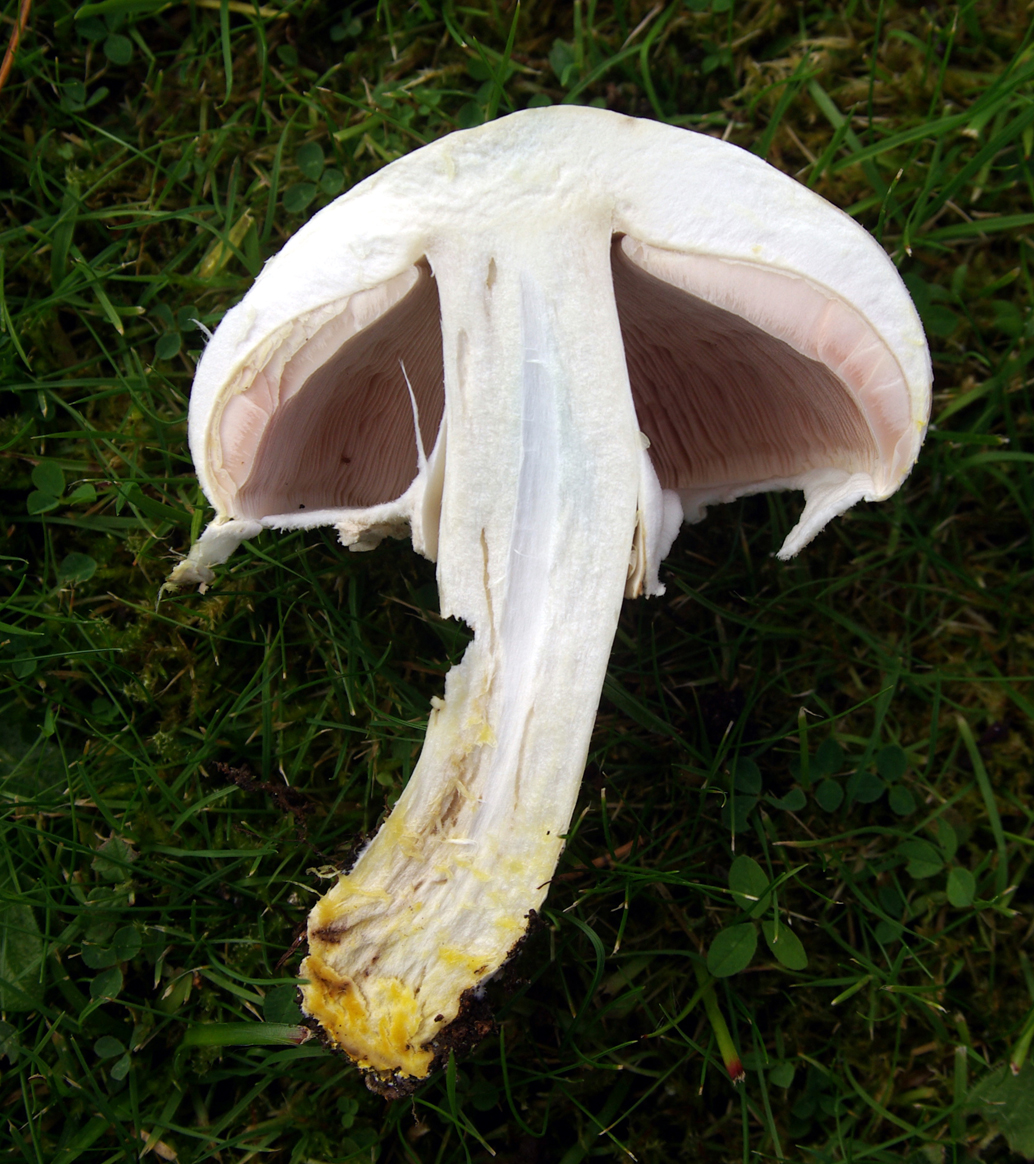

Scientific classification
- Kingdom: Fungi
- Division: Basidiomycota
- Class: Agaricomycetes
- Order: Agaricales
- Family: Agaricaceae
- Genus: Agaricus
- Species: A. xanthodermus

Binomial name
- Agaricus xanthodermus Genev. (1876)

Synonyms
- Pratella xanthoderma (Genev.) Gillet (1884); Psalliota xanthoderma (Genev.) Richon & Roze (1885); Fungus xanthodermus (Genev.) Kuntze (1898)

= Agaricus xanthodermus =

Species of fungus

Agaricus xanthodermus
- Mycological characteristics
- Gills on hymenium
- Cap is convex
- Hymenium is free
- Stipe has a ring
- Spore print is brown
- Ecology is saprotrophic
- Edibility is poisonous

Agaricus xanthodermus, commonly known as the yellow-staining agaricus, yellow-staining mushroom or yellow-stainer, is a species of fungus in the genus Agaricus. It displays a strong yellow colouration at the base of the stem when cut. It has a strong "sickeningly sweet" phenolic smell. It is poisonous for most people, causing gastric upset, but can be eaten by some without apparent negative effect.

== Taxonomy ==
This species was first officially defined under the name Agaricus xanthodermus in 1876 by Léon Gaston Genevier, in a letter published in the bulletin of the French Botanical Society. Genevier described the Agaricus mushrooms commonly eaten (perhaps sometimes inadvisedly) in the region of Nantes, and attempted to clarify the distinctions between them. He proposed a detailed reclassification into 5 species, including this new one. Apparently up until that time, these yellow-staining mushrooms were considered to be just varieties of other edible species: A. edulis, A. arvensis, and A. silvicola.

The epithet xanthodermus is derived from the Ancient Greek words for "yellow" and "skin", which were then given a Latin adjective ending. This is the official name, but the form Agaricus xanthoderma is also often seen. In the latter name, -derma "skin" is a neuter noun which does not have to agree in gender with Agaricus, and so this form is legal according to the rules of botanical nomenclature.

== Description ==
The cap ranges from 5–15 cm (2–6 in) in diameter. It is initially convex, with some young specimens having a squarish shape, though flattening with age. It is whitish, with light brown tints towards the centre. The cap is dry and smooth, but can be scaly when old. The gills of this mushroom progress from pale-pink to a chocolate color. Its white stipe measures 5–12 cm (2.0–4.7 in) tall and 1–3 wide, and is bulbous with a skirt-like ring. Microscopically, the cheilocystidia are club-shaped. The spores are brown, elliptical, and smooth, measuring 6–7 × 3–4 μm.

The species has an unpleasant characteristic "sickeningly sweet" smell, which is from phenolic compounds, somewhat reminiscent of carbolic soap. The smell is especially strong at the base of the stem. On cooking, the smell becomes very noticeable, and this may deter people from eating it inadvertently.

=== Similar species ===
The main identifying feature is an immediate bright yellow colouration on cutting through the base of the stem, or scraping the flesh; later, the affected area fades to a dull brown. Numerous edible Agaricus species, such as A. augustus, A. arvensis and A. silvicola, turn yellow to a greater or lesser extent, but they do not display such an intense reaction.

Agaricus xanthodermus belongs to a group of related species (the "Xanthodermati") which likewise discolour bright yellow and have a phenolic smell. They include A. praeclaresquamosus (formerly A. placomyces) which has dark grey scales, A. moelleri, and A. pilatianus, which does not have a bulbous stem.

Agaricus californicus is also similar in appearance.

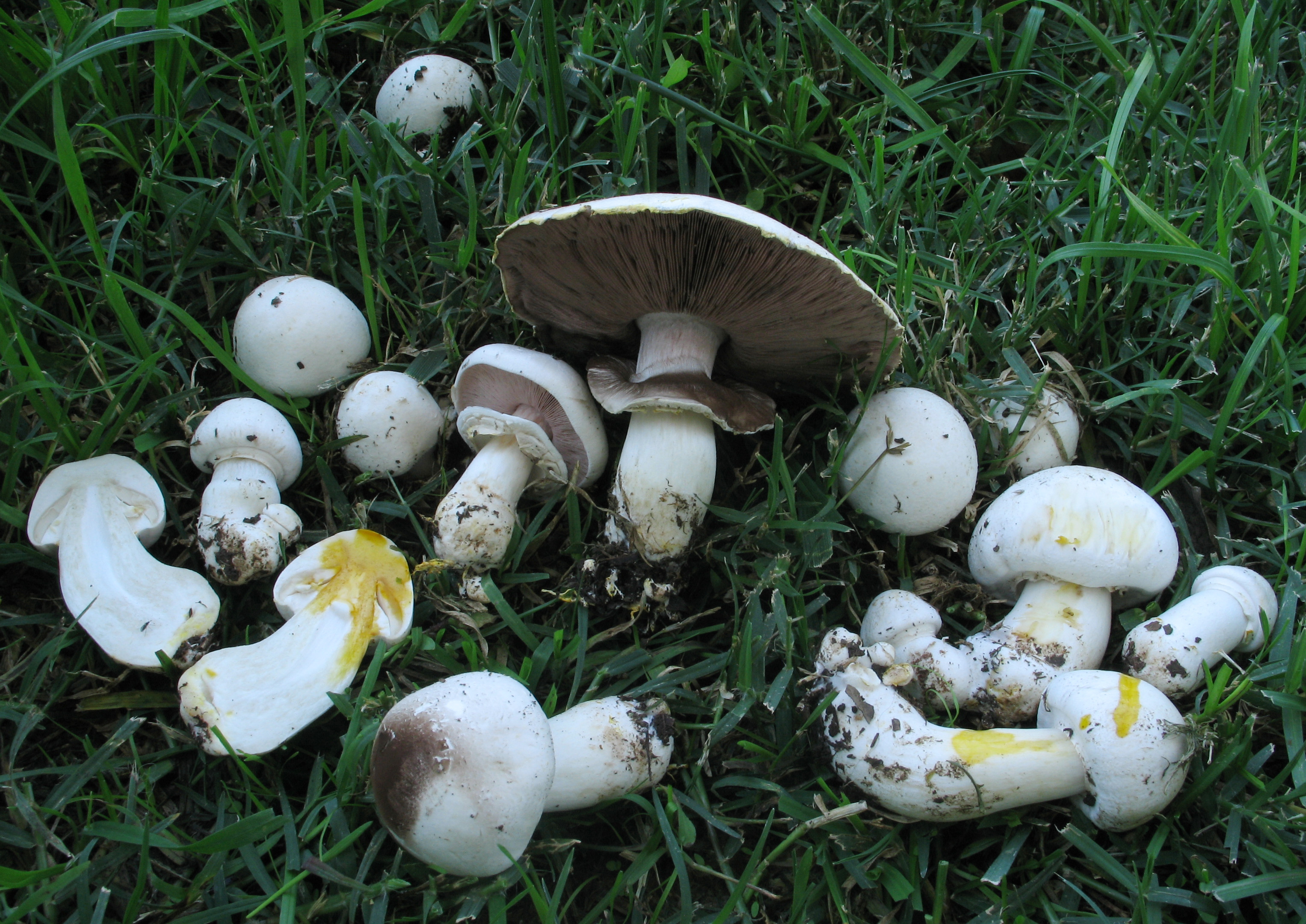
Specimens amongst grass

== Distribution and habitat ==
This mushroom is very common and widely distributed in North America, Europe, West Asia including eastern Anatolia and Iran, North Africa, and southern Africa. It has been introduced into Australia. It occurs in woods, lawns, gardens and hedgerows in autumn. This is a saprobic species.

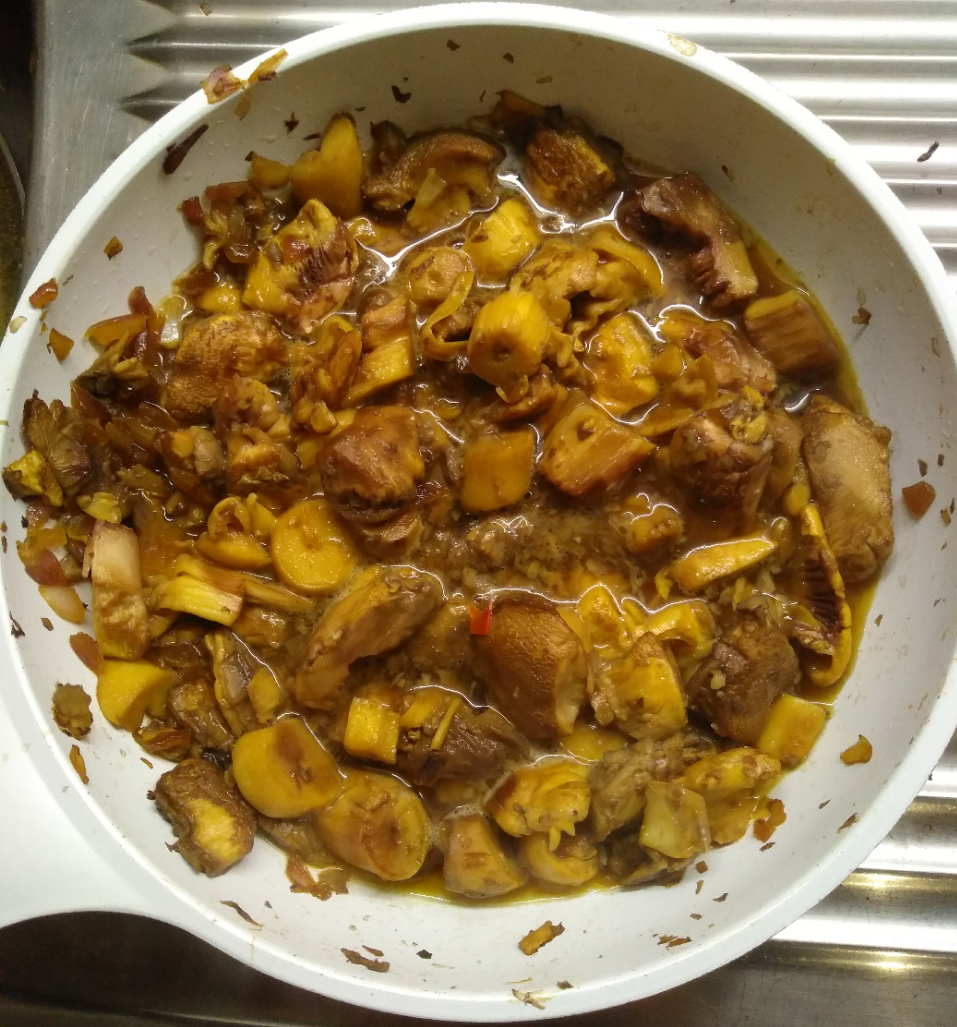
After cooking, the flesh of this poisonous species turns yellow.

== Toxicity ==
Although it appears that some people can eat this mushroom without ill effects, it contains toxins which can cause serious gastrointestinal upset. It is indigestible and gives rise to symptoms of sweating, flushing, and severe stomach cramps. It is considered poisonous and specifically prohibited for sale in Italy.

Of those who gather Agaricus-style mushrooms, about 50% of the cases of poisoning are from this species.

== See also ==
- List of Agaricus species
