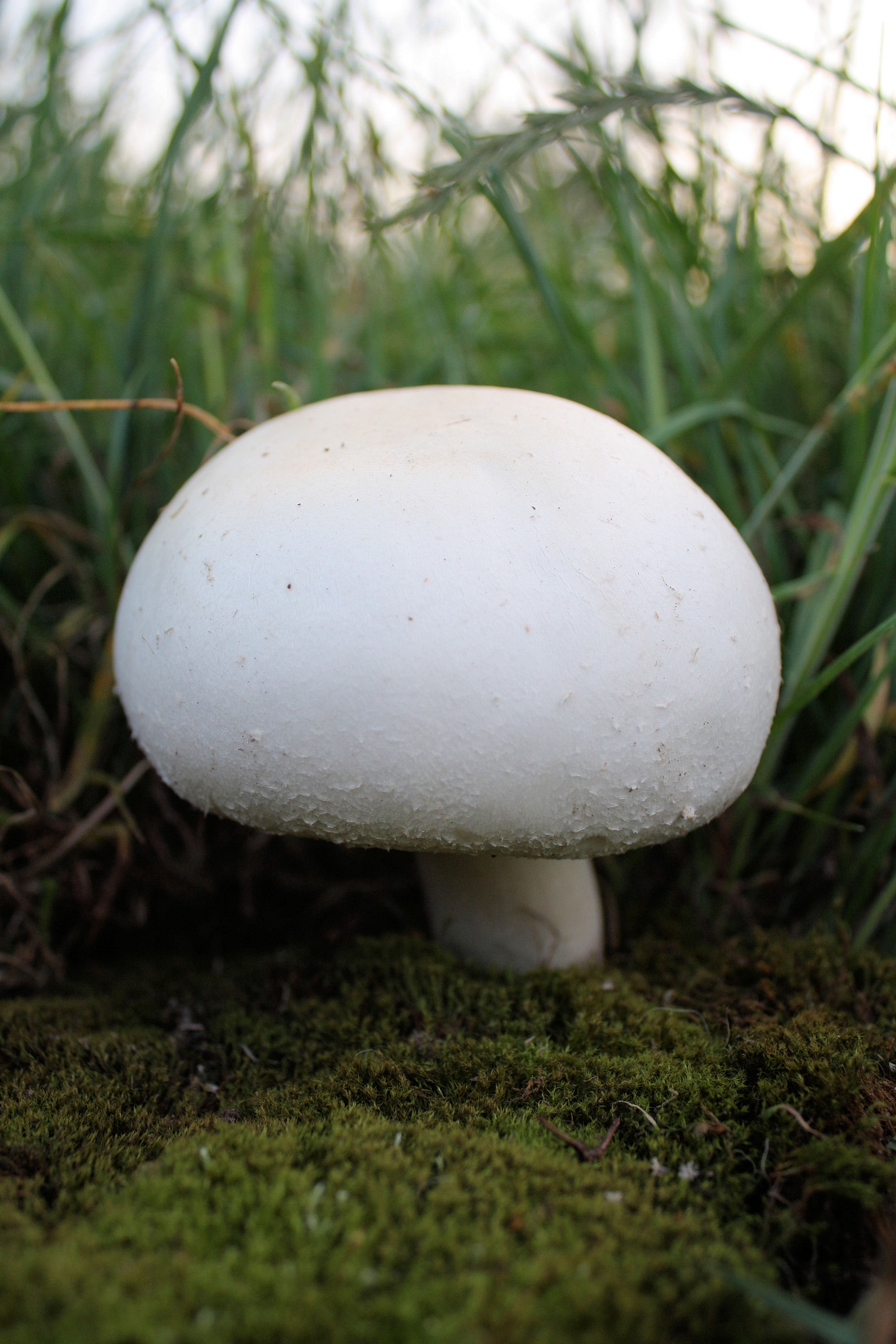

Conservation status
- Least Concern (IUCN 3.1)

Scientific classification
- Kingdom: Fungi
- Division: Basidiomycota
- Class: Agaricomycetes
- Order: Agaricales
- Family: Agaricaceae
- Genus: Agaricus
- Species: A. arvensis

Binomial name
- Agaricus arvensis Schaeff. (1774)

= Agaricus arvensis =

Horse mushroom

Species of fungus

Agaricus arvensis
- Mycological characteristics
- Gills on hymenium
- Cap is convex
- Hymenium is free
- Stipe has a ring
- Spore print is brown to blackish-brown
- Ecology is saprotrophic
- Edibility is choice

Agaricus arvensis, commonly known as the horse mushroom, is a mushroom-forming fungus of the genus Agaricus.

== Taxonomy ==
It was described as Agaricus arvensis by Jacob Christian Schaeffer in 1774, and given numerous binomial descriptions since. Its specific epithet arvensis means "of the field".

== Description ==
The cap is 7–20 cm (3–8 in) across, whitish, smooth, and dry; it stains yellow, particularly when young. The gills are pale pink to white at first, later passing through grey and brown to become dull chocolate. A large, spreading ring has white above, but sometimes with yellowish scales underneath. Viewed from below, on a closed-cap specimen, the twin-layered ring has a well-developed "cogwheel" pattern around the stipe. This is the lower part of the double ring. The stalk is 5–12 cm (2–4 1/2 in) long and 1–3 cm wide.

The spores are brown and smooth, producing a dark brown spore print. Its odor is similar to that of almond extract or marzipan, due to the presence of benzaldehyde. It tends to stain yellow on bruising.

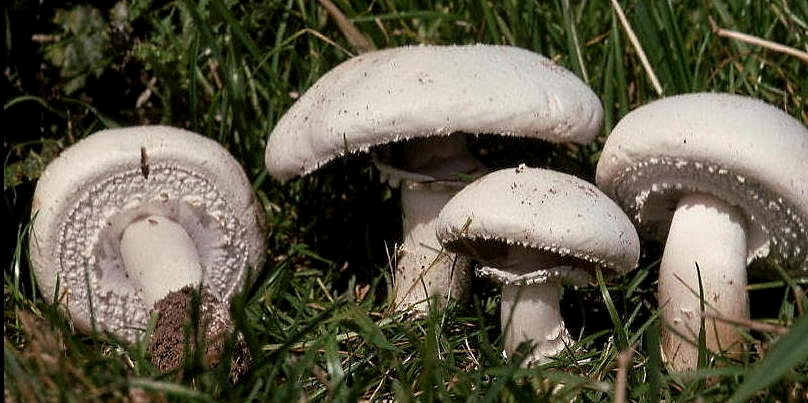
"Cogwheels" visible on undersides

=== Similar species ===
In addition to its similarity to other related species, this fungus can be confused with deadly species of Amanita.

Agaricus osecanus is rare and lacks the almond smell. Agaricus xanthodermus, the yellow stainer, can cause stomach upsets.

It could also be confused with Agaricus campestris, or field mushroom, that is also a choice edible mushroom. A. arvensis has a larger and more prominent fruiting body, as well as a distinctive aniseed smell, and a larger ring, but most notably A. campestris lacks the "cogweel" shape that A. arvensis has around the stipe.

Confusion with mushrooms from the genus Parasola is also common, especially in younger specimens, due to the fact that the gills of A. arvensis remain white for a long time.

== Distribution and habitat ==
It is one of the largest white Agaricus species in Britain (where it appears during May–October), and West Asia (Iran). A. arvensis also occurs in South Africa, Japan, Russia, New Zeeland, Australia, the USA, Canada, and parts of Europe.

Frequently found near stables, as well as in meadows and lawns, it may form fairy rings. The mushroom is often found growing with nettles (a plant that also likes nutrient-rich soil). It is associated with cypress on the North American West Coast and spruce to the east.

== Conservation ==
This mushroom is considered common and widespread, thus is not a conservation concern.

== Edibility ==
This is a choice edible species, but Agaricus mushrooms along with many other species bioaccumulate heavy metals when growing in contaminated substrates. Additionally, this mushroom can resemble deadly Amanita mushrooms, such as A. verna.
