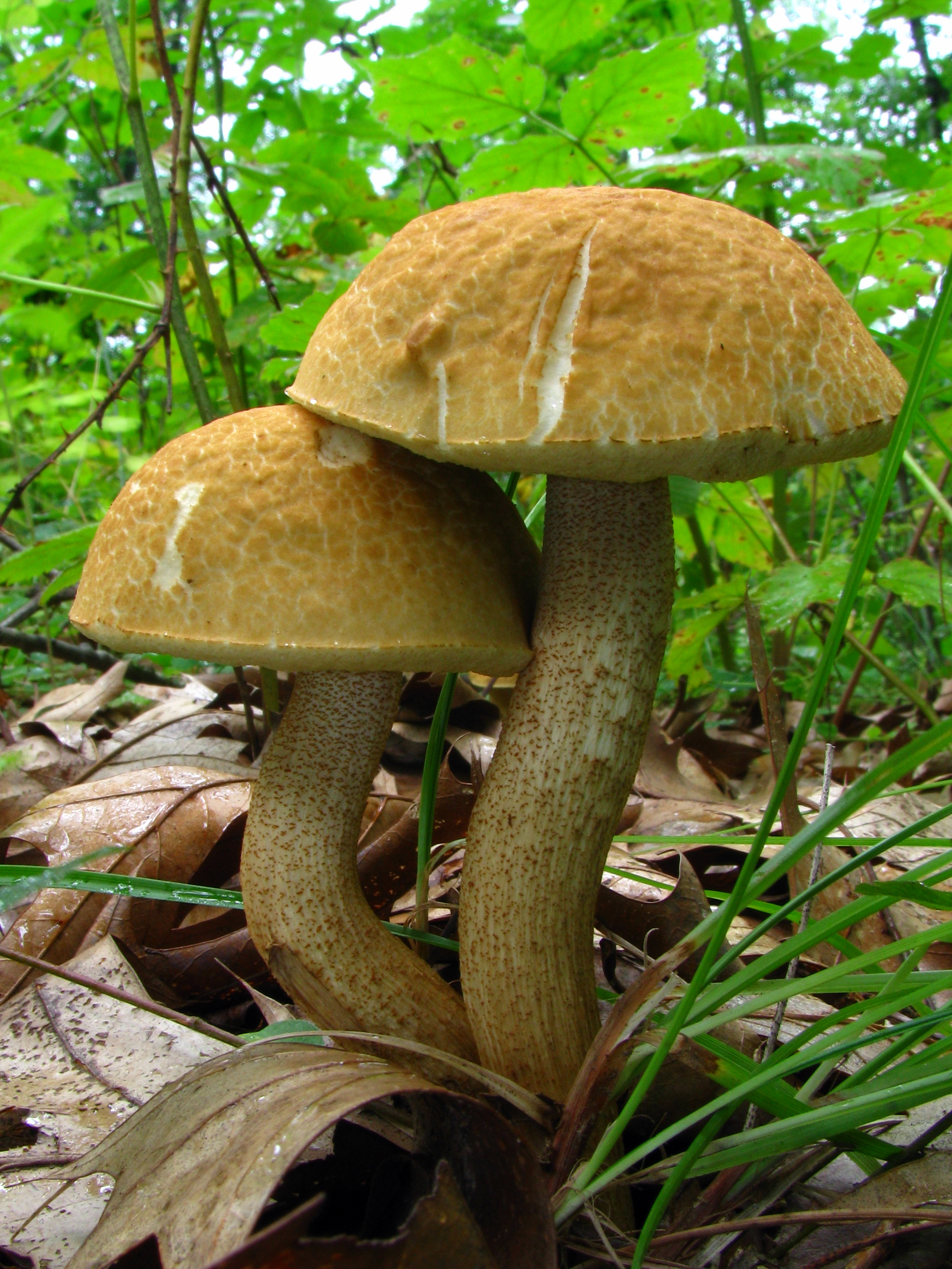

Scientific classification
- Kingdom: Fungi
- Division: Basidiomycota
- Class: Agaricomycetes
- Order: Boletales
- Family: Boletaceae
- Genus: Leccinellum
- Species: L. rugosiceps

Binomial name
- Leccinellum rugosiceps (Peck) C. Hahn 2020

Synonyms
- List: Boletus rugosiceps Peck (1904); Krombholzia rugosiceps (Peck) Singer (1942); Krombholziella rugosiceps (Peck) Šutara (1982); Leccinum rugosiceps (Peck) Singer (1945)

= Leccinellum rugosiceps =

Species of fungus

Leccinellum rugosiceps, commonly known as the wrinkled Leccinum, is a species of bolete fungus. It is found in Asia, North America, Central America, and South America, where it grows in an ectomycorrhizal association with oak. Fruitbodies have convex, yellowish caps up to 15 cm (5.9 in) in diameter. In age, the cap surface becomes wrinkled, often revealing white cracks. The stipe is up to 10 cm (3.9 in) long and 3 cm (1.2 in) wide, with brown scabers on an underlying yellowish surface. It has firm flesh that stains initially pinkish to reddish and then to grayish or blackish when injured. The pore surface on the cap underside is yellowish. Fruitbodies are edible, although opinions vary as to their desirability.

== Taxonomy ==
The species was first described scientifically in 1904 by American mycologist Charles Horton Peck as Boletus rugosiceps. The type collection was made in the woods of Port Jefferson, New York. Rolf Singer transferred it to Leccinum in 1945. Synonyms include Krombholzia rugosiceps, published by Rolf Singer in 1942, and Krombholziella rugosiceps, published by Josef Šutara in 1982. Krombholzia and Krombholziella are now obsolete genera that have since been subsumed into Leccinum.

Leccinellum rugosiceps is classified in a grouping of species that are associated with oak and hornbeam. Others in this grouping include L. albellum and L. pseudoscabrum.

The specific epithet rugosiceps, which is derived from the Latin roots for "rough" and "head", refers to its wrinkled cap. It is commonly known as the "wrinkled Leccinum".

== Description ==
The convex cap measures 5–15 cm (2.0–5.9 in) wide. Its color is orange-yellow, aging to yellow-brown. The cap margin has a narrow flap of sterile tissue. The surface of the cap is dry, with wrinkles and pits at maturity. It often becomes cracked in age, and the whitish flesh underneath shows through. The cap tends to undergo significant color changes throughout its development—first bright yellow, then dark brown, then finally pale tan—which may make it difficult to identify in the field. The flesh is white to pale yellow, and it stains reddish to burgundy when cut or bruised. This staining is most prominent at the junction of the cap and the stipe. Further exposure over the course of 20–60 minutes results in the flesh becoming grayish to blackish. The flesh has no distinctive door or taste. The pore surface is initially dull yellow, and sometimes ages to dingy olive-brown. Unlike many other boletes, it does not turn blue when bruised, although it may have natural blue-green stains. The pores are circular, measuring less than 1 mm, while the tubes extend to 8–14 mm deep. The stipe measures 3–10 cm (1.2–3.9 in) long by 1–3 cm (0.4–1.2 in) thick. It is nearly equal in length throughout or tapered from the top to base. Its color is pale yellow to brownish underneath the pale brown scabers that darken in age.

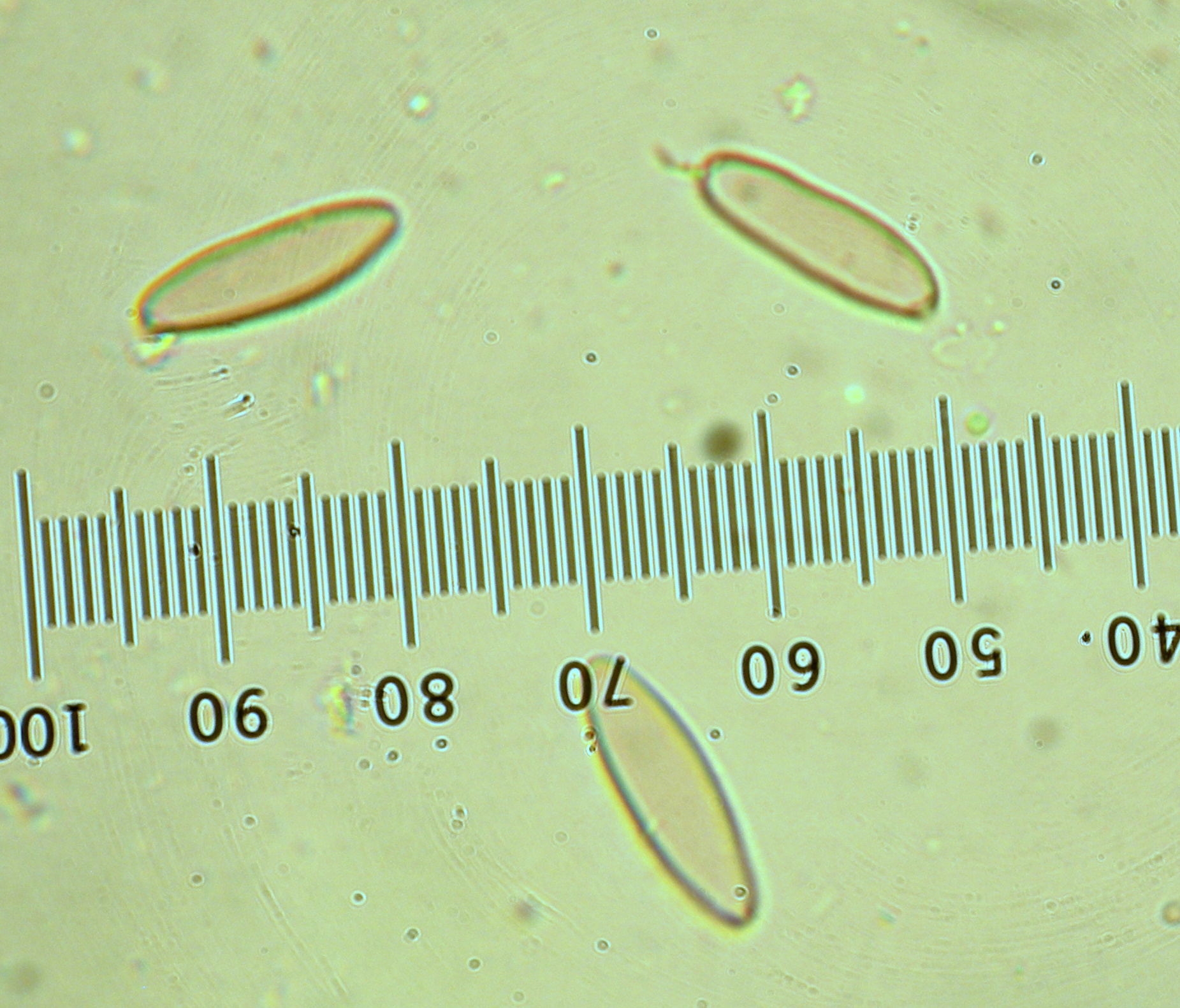
Spores are smooth and spindle shaped.

The spore print color ranges from brown to olive-brown. Spores are spindle shaped, measuring 15–19 long by 5–6 μm. They have a smooth surface, and are inamyloid (i.e., not staining with Melzer's reagent). The cap flesh is bilateral and inamyloid. The cystidia on the pores are present as conspicuous pleuro- and cheilocystidia. The cap cuticle is present as a hymeniform layer. Clamp connections are absent.

Several chemical tests can be used to help verify an identification of L. rugosiceps. A drop of ammonium hydroxide solution turns the cap cuticle a reddish color or is unreactive, and yellow or unreactive on the flesh. A drop of dilute potassium hydroxide (KOH) turns the cap surface red, and the flesh yellowish to orangish. Application of iron(II) sulfate solution produces a gray color on the cap surface, and greenish-gray to olive coloration on the flesh.

=== Similar species ===
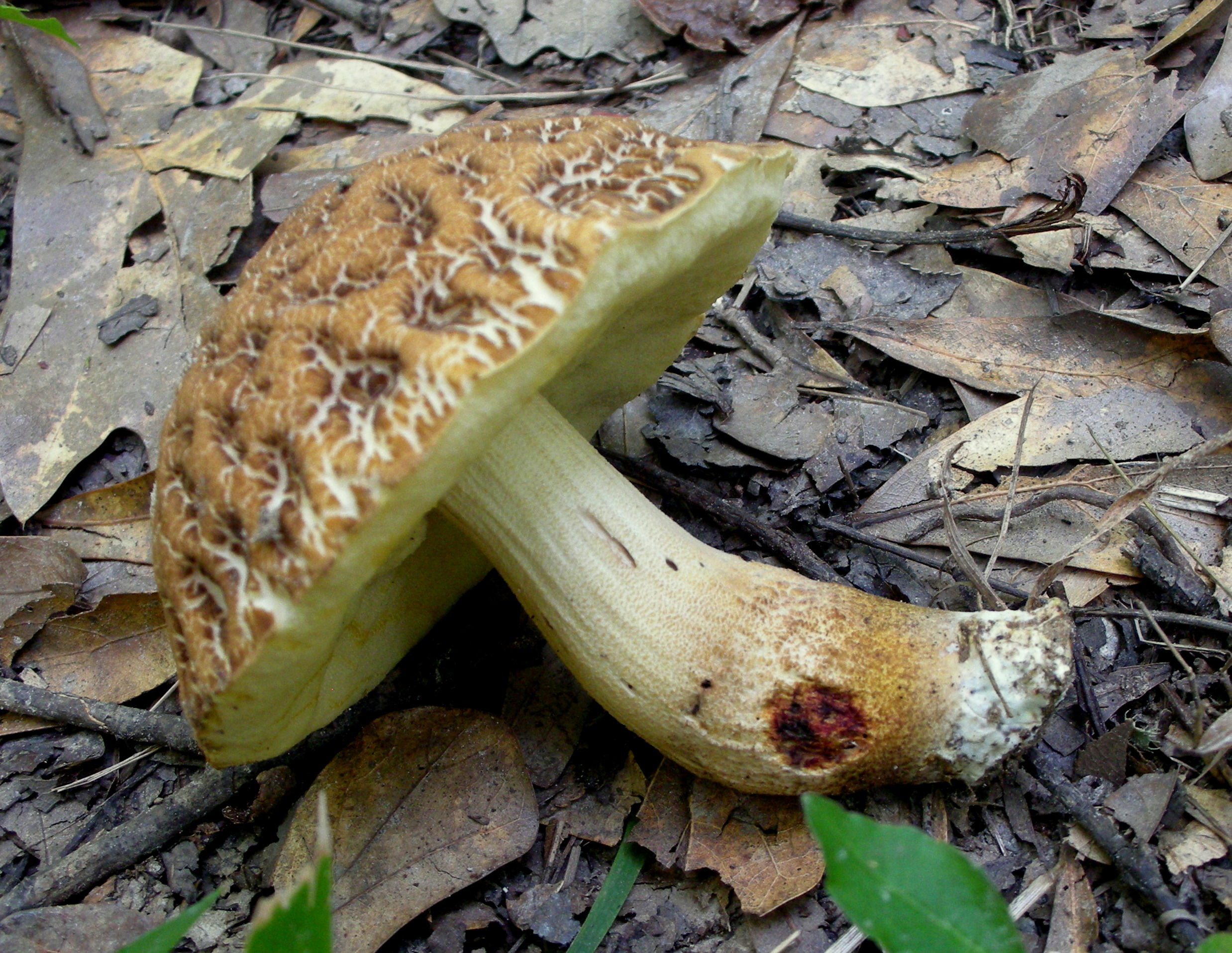
Leccinellum crocipodium is a lookalike

The Costa Rican bolete Leccinum neotropicalis is a closely allied species. It is distinguished from L. rugosiceps by its dark brown to dark reddish-brown color, and flesh that does not stain with injury. L. viscosum, found in Belize, features a similar cap and scaber pigmentation on the stipe, and similar color changes in response to injury in the flesh of the cap and the apex of the stipe; unlike L. rugosiceps, however, it also stains at the stipe base, and the cap is sticky rather than dry.

L. crocipodium is a lookalike that is difficult to distinguish from L. rugosiceps. It generally has a darker cap, paler scabers, and somewhat wider spores, although these characteristics are variable. In his original species description, Charles Peck noted that L. rugosiceps grew with Hemileccinum rubropunctum, "from which it is easily separated by its dry pileus, smaller tubes and stouter stem."

== Edibility ==
An edible species, Leccinellum rugosiceps mushrooms have been described variously as "great", and "of poor quality". They have a nutty flavor and firm texture; older specimens are less firm but retain the flavor. Drying the mushrooms enhances the flavor. The stipe tends to harbor insect larvae and should be cleaned before consumption. The sugar alcohol mannitol is present in the fruitbodies.

== Habitat and distribution ==
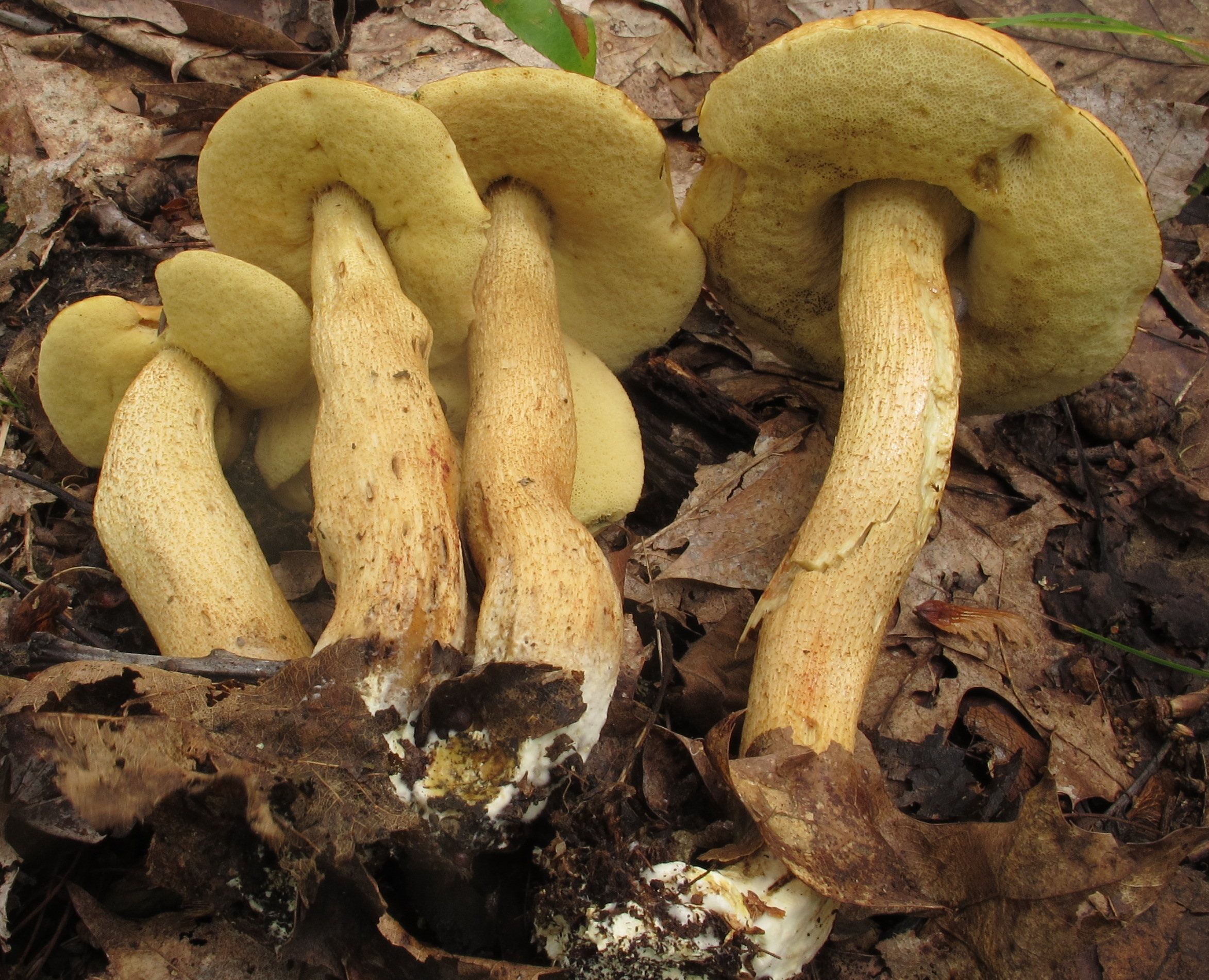
A collection of L. rugosiceps fruitbodies

Leccinellum rugosiceps is an ectomycorrhizal fungus that associates with oak. In eastern North America, pin oak (Quercus palustris) is a frequent host. The bolete fruits singly or in groups in forests, shaded lawns, and often found in areas disturbed by human activity, such as pathsides and picnic areas. Fruiting typically occurs from July to September. A Chinese study evaluating the concentrations of heavy metals in boletes found that in L. rugosiceps fruitbodies, the levels of cadmium, zinc, copper, and mercury exceeded that of national safety standards for edible fungi.

The bolete is found from eastern Canada south to Florida and Mississippi, west to Michigan in the United States. The distribution extends south to Mexico, Costa Rica, and Colombia. It is one of several boletes that have a north to south clinal trend. In Asia, the species has been reported from India, Korea, China, and Taiwan. Taiwanese specimens tend to have slightly smaller spores (10–16 by 4–5 μm) than those from mainland China or from America.

== See also ==
- List of North American boletes
