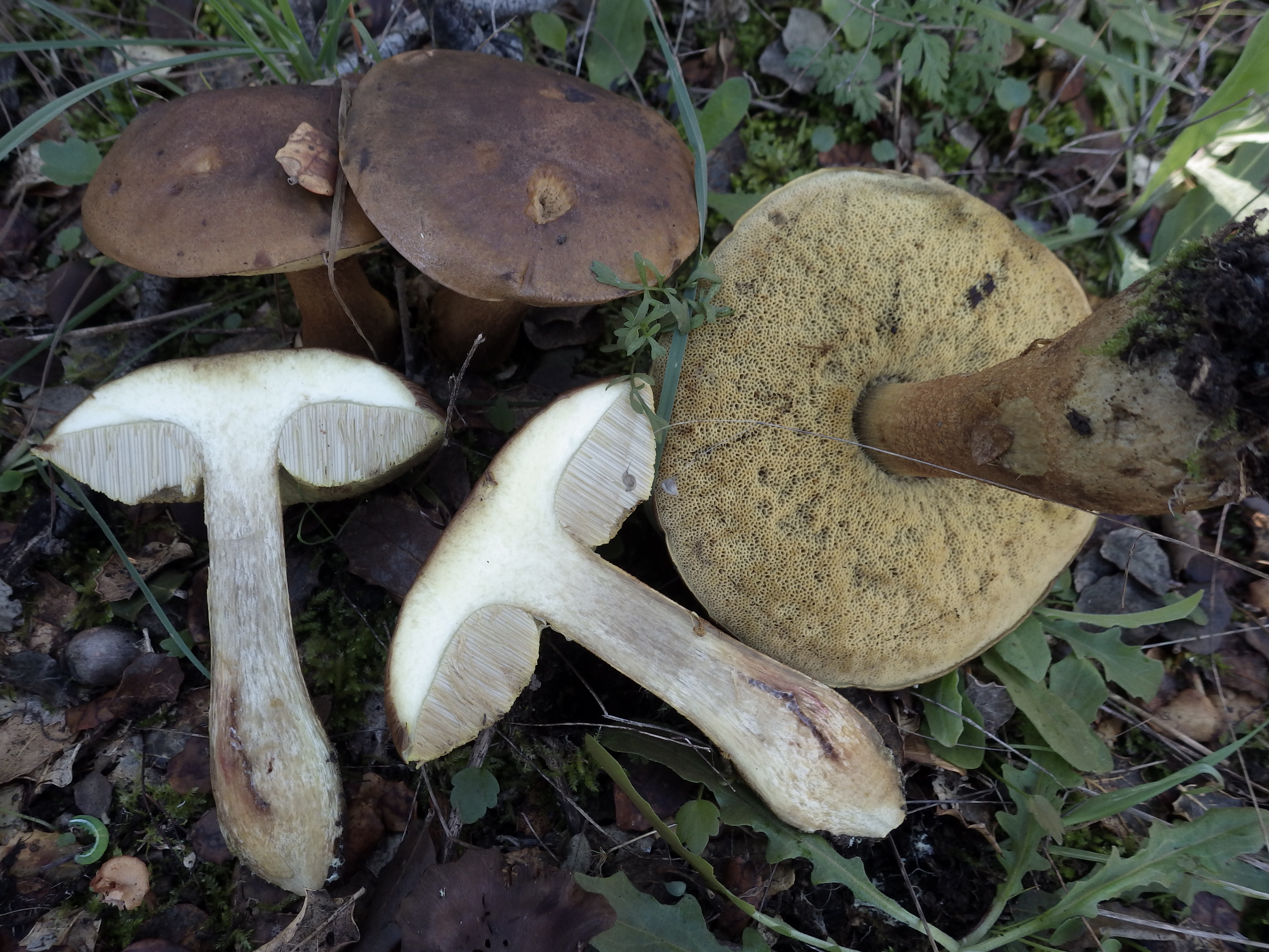

Scientific classification
- Kingdom: Fungi
- Division: Basidiomycota
- Class: Agaricomycetes
- Order: Boletales
- Family: Boletaceae
- Genus: Leccinellum
- Species: L. lepidum

Binomial name
- Leccinellum lepidum (H.Bouchet ex Essette) Bresinsky & Manfr.Binder (2003)

Synonyms
- Boletus lepidus H.Bouchet ex Essette (1965); Leccinum lepidum (H.Bouchet ex Essette) Bon & Contu (1990); Krombholziella lepida (H.Bouchet ex Essette) Bon & Contu (1985) nom. inval.; Krombholziella lepida (H.Bouchet ex Essette) Alessio (1985)

= Leccinellum lepidum =

Species of fungus

Leccinellum lepidum
- Mycological characteristics
- Pores on hymenium
- Cap is convex
- Stipe is bare
- Spore print is olive-brown
- Ecology is mycorrhizal
- Edibility is edible

Leccinellum lepidum is a species of bolete in the family Boletaceae. Originally described as Boletus lepidus in 1965, the fungus has gone through controversial taxonomic treatments over the years and was subsequently transferred to genus Krombholziella in 1985, to genus Leccinum in 1990, and to genus Leccinellum in 2003. It is the sister-species of Leccinellum corsicum, with which it had been erroneously synonymised by some authors in the past.

Like other species of Boletaceae, it has tubes and pores instead of gills in its hymenial (fertile) surface and produces large, fleshy fruit bodies up to 20 cm across. Fruit bodies have the tendency to stain orange, violaceous grey and eventually blackish brown when handled or when the flesh is exposed to the air.

Native to southern Europe, L. lepidum is abundantly present throughout the Mediterranean, growing in mycorrhizal symbiosis with various species of oak (Quercus), particularly evergreen members of the "Ilex" group. Despite its southern distribution, the fungus is notable for its late fruiting and tolerance to low temperatures, and is often the only bolete fruiting during the cold winter months.

It is an edible mushroom, though not as highly regarded as sought-after boletes of the genus Boletus.

== Taxonomy and phylogeny ==
Originally described as Boletus lepidus by H. Essette in 1965, Leccinellum lepidum has been controversially treated by various authors, who placed it in different genera or at times synonymised it with other taxa. In 1985, the species was invalidly recombined into genus Leccinum by mycologists Marcel Bon and Marco Contu, but later in the same year Italian mycologist Carlo Alessio transferred it to Krombholziella, a genus that later became a synonym of Leccinum. Bon recombined it as a variety of Leccinum crocipodium in 1989, only to recombine it again with M. Contu as Leccinum lepidum, in 1990. Heinz Engel and colleagues, on the other hand, rejected all previous names and considered the taxon to be a synonym of Leccinum corsicum, a closely related species associated with Cistaceae shrubs.

In 2003, the species was transferred to the newly segregated genus Leccinellum by mycologists Andreas Bresinsky and Manfred Binder, together with other yellow-pored taxa formerly placed in Leccinum. Subsequent phylogenetic and chemotaxonomical analyses by Binder & Besl and Den Bakker & Noordeloos, questioned the segregation of Leccinellum, but suggested that L. lepidum, L. corsicum and L. crocipodium are probably distinct species. However, the three taxa were initially represented by very few sequences and the inclusive "corsicum/lepidum" clade received high support in preliminary phylogenetic analyses. In a 2014 paper, Bertolini controversially abandoned Leccinellum and placed L. lepidum in synonymy with L. corsicum once again, only for the genus to be reinstated in the same year by Wu and colleagues, in a major contribution delineating 22 generic clades in the family Boletaceae. The confusion was finally clarified in 2019, when several collections from Corsica, Croatia, Cyprus, France and Greece were analysed in an elaborate phylogenetic, biogeographical and ecological treatment by M. Loizides and colleagues. In this study, Leccinellum was phylogenetically validated, while L. lepidum, L. corsicum and L. crocipodium formed well-supported lineages within the genus, and were confirmed as distinct species.

=== Etymology ===
The Latin epithet lèpidus, meaning "pleasant" or "charming", likely refers to the appearance or culinary qualities of the fungus.

== Description ==
=== Morphology ===
Leccinellum lepidum produces large, fleshy fruit bodies. The cap is at first hemispherical, gradually becoming convex or convex-flat as the fungus expands, reaching a diameter of 6 to 20 cm (2.5 to 8 in). The cap cuticle is smooth to somewhat lobed and often with a "hammered" appearance, moderately to strongly viscid in wet weather, ranging in colour from ochraceous yellow to ochraceous brown, chestnut-brown, or in very old specimens blackish brown.

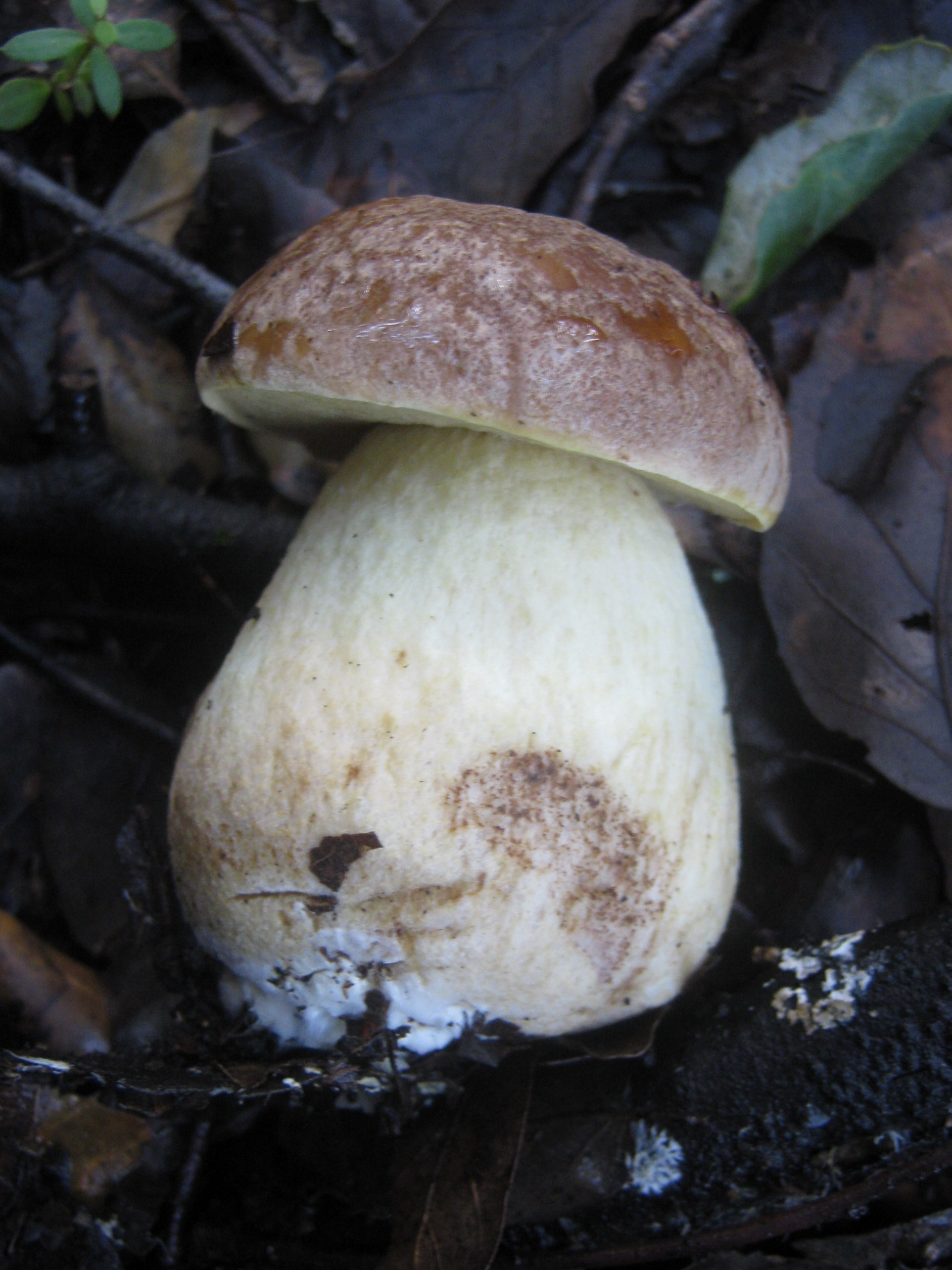
Young fruit body of Leccinellum lepidum.

The tubes are more or less free from the stem, 1 to 2 cm (0.5 to 1 in) long and pale yellow to ochraceous yellow. The pores are small and rounded, concolorous with the tubes, slowly staining rusty-brown and finally greyish brown when handled or with age.

The stem is 5 to 15 cm (2 to 6 in) long by 2 to 6 cm (1 to 2.5 in) wide, usually stout and short-ventricose at first, but gradually becoming longer and clavate to cylindrical, ranging in colour from ochraceous yellow to pale yellow, straw-coloured, or dirty white. Its surface is covered in tiny pustules (scabrosities), concolorous with the stem surface at first, but often staining rusty-brown or grey-brown with age and sometimes coalescing to form an incomplete pseudoreticulum (false net).

The flesh is thick and dull yellow to straw-coloured. When cut or exposed to the air it very slowly discoloures orange or violaceous-grey in parts, and after a few hours darkens to greyish-brown or grey-black. The smell is weakly fungoid in young specimens, becoming stronger in old specimens, while the taste is mild to somewhat astringent. The spores are tobacco-brown in mass.

Under the microscope, the spores appear narrowly ellipsoid to fusiform (spinde-shaped) and measure 13.5–22 × 5–6 μm. The cap cuticle is a trichodermium of septate cylindrical hyphae, often finely incrusted.

=== Mycorrhiza ===
The ectomycorrhiza formed by L. lepidum with the holm oak has been described in detail. It is characterised by a Hartig net devoid of haustoria, a plectenchymatous outer mantle of warty hyphae arranged in a ring-like formation, highly differentiated rhizomorphs which are rounded in cross-section and connected to the mantle, and a negative reaction to FeSO_{4}, KOH or guaiac.

=== Similar species ===
- Leccinellum corsicum is closely related to L. lepidum, and the two taxa had been previously placed in synonymy by some authors. However, L. corsicum is a smaller species rarely exceeding 10 cm (4 in) in diameter, is exclusively associated with rockroses (Cistus species), and has the tendency to stain more reddish when its flesh is exposed to the air.
- Leccinellum crocipodium is also similar, but typically fruits earlier in the season in association with deciduous oaks. It produces more slender and elongated fruit bodies, with a cap cuticle that has the tendency to crack extensively at maturity.

== Ecology, phenology and distribution ==
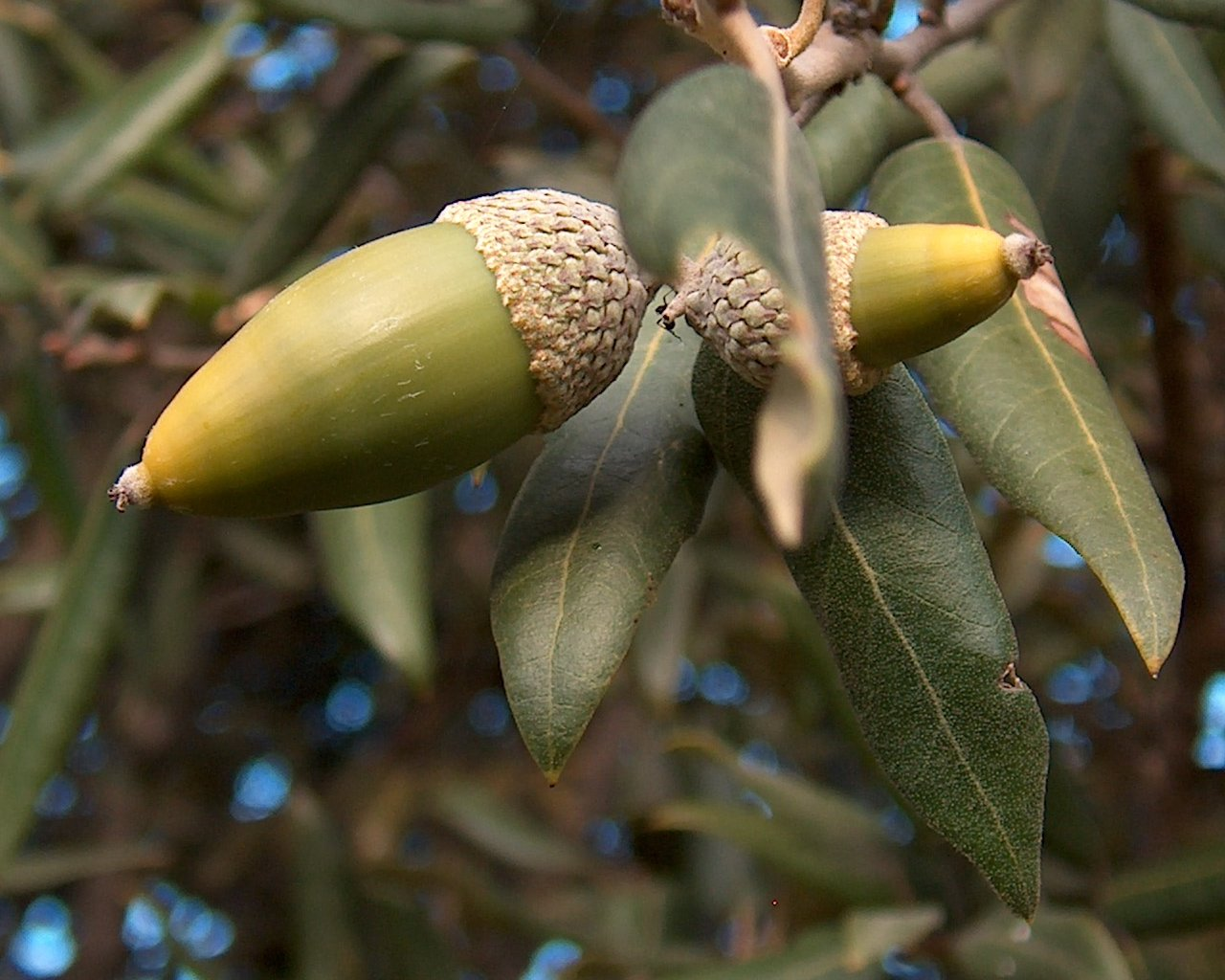
The holm oak is a common host of L. lepidum.

The species is widespread in the Mediterranean region, where it forms ectomycorrhizal associations with various species of oak. It is most commonly associated with evergreen members of the "Ilex" group, particularly the holm oak (Quercus ilex), but also the golden oak (Quercus alnifolia), the kermes oak (Q. coccifera) and the Palestine oak (Q. calliprinos). In the western parts of the Mediterranean basin, it is frequently found under the cork oak (Q. suber), while collections under the semi-deciduous Portuguese oak (Q. faginea) have also been reported. It is indifferent to the substrate and occurs abundantly on both calcareous and acidic soil.

Although a southern species, the fungus is notable for its late fruiting season and tolerance to low temperatures. In a 10-year study from the island of Cyprus, L. lepidum was the most frequently recorded bolete, accounting for over half (61%) of all Boletaceae collections found during the winter months (December–February).

== Edibility ==
Leccinellum lepidum is edible, though opinions on its culinary value vary. It is generally regarded gastronomically inferior to other popular boletes (such as Boletus edulis or B. aereus), while the tendency of its fruit bodies to stain black makes the mushroom unappealing to some people.
