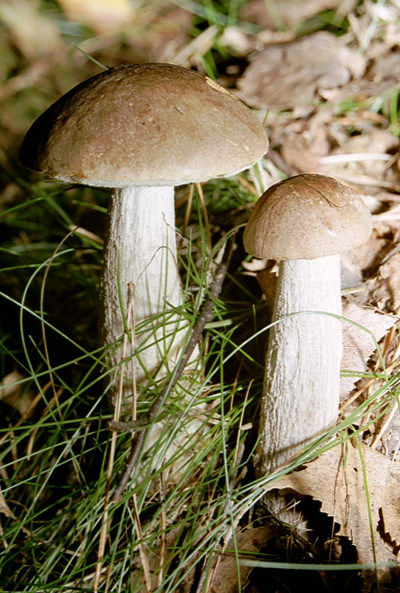

Scientific classification
- Kingdom: Fungi
- Division: Basidiomycota
- Class: Agaricomycetes
- Order: Boletales
- Family: Boletaceae
- Genus: Leccinum
- Species: L. scabrum

Binomial name
- Leccinum scabrum (Bull.) Gray (1821)

Synonyms
- Boletus scaber Bull. (1783); Krombholzia scabra (Bull.) P.Karst. (1881)

= Leccinum scabrum =

Species of fungus

Leccinum scabrum
- Mycological characteristics
- Pores on hymenium
- Cap is convex
- Hymenium is adnate
- Stipe is bare
- Spore print is olive
- Ecology is mycorrhizal
- Edibility is edible but not recommended

Leccinum scabrum, commonly known as the birch bolete, rough-stemmed bolete, or scaber stalk, is a species of fungus in the family Boletaceae. It was formerly classified as Boletus scaber.

The birch bolete is widespread in Europe, in the Himalayas in Asia, and elsewhere in the Northern Hemisphere, occurring only in mycorrhizal association with birch trees. This mushroom is also becoming increasingly common in Australia and New Zealand where it is likely introduced. It is an edible mushroom if only firm specimens are used and cooked thoroughly.

== Description ==
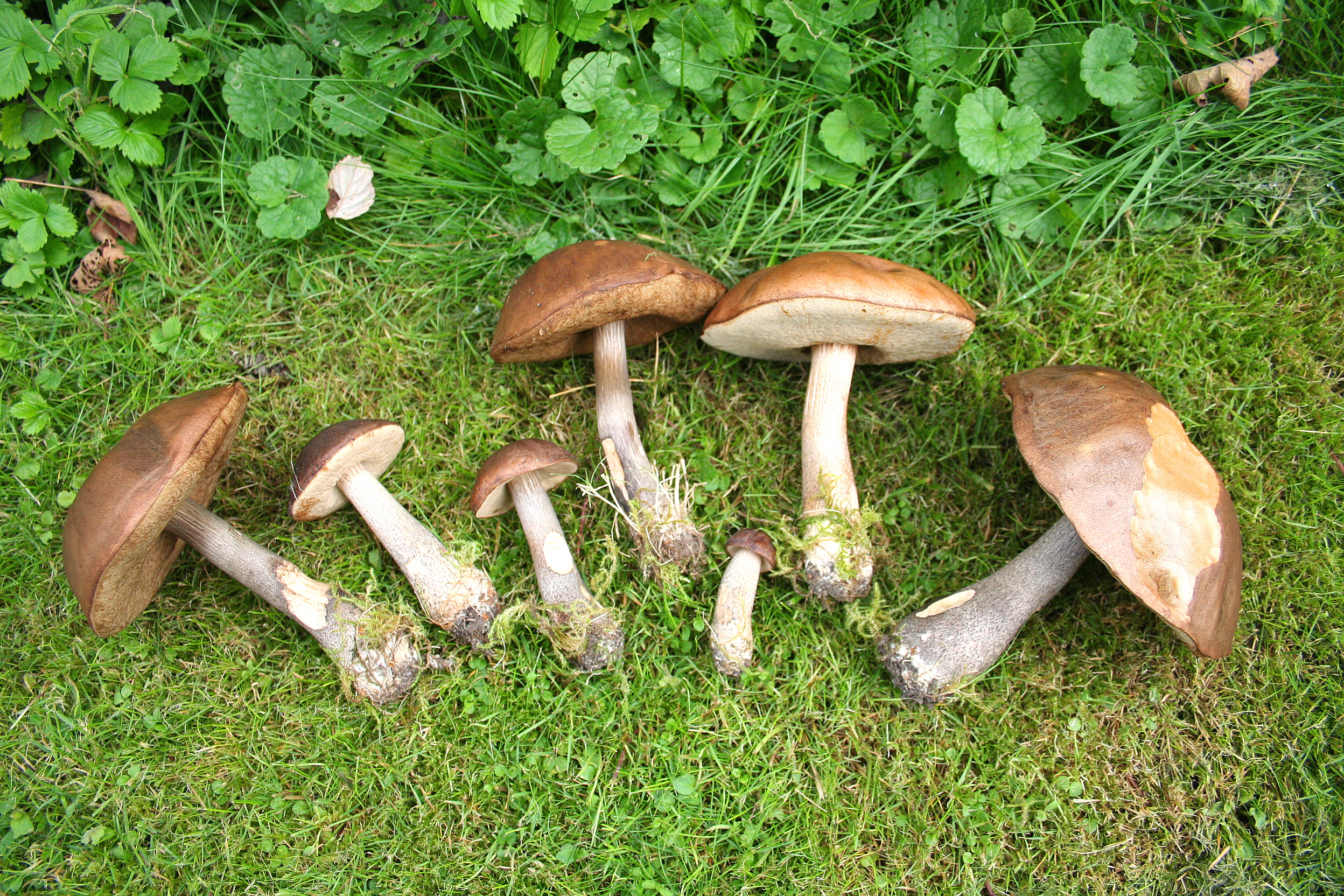
L. scabrum of different ages

The cap is 4–10 cm (1 1/2–4 in) wide and convex before flattening. The skin of the cap is tan or brownish, usually with a lighter edge; it is smooth, bald, and dry to viscid.

The pores are whitish at a young age, later gray. In older specimens, the pores on the pileus can bulge out, while around the stipe they dent in strongly. The pore covering is easy to remove from the skin of the pileus. The spore print is brown. The spores measure 13–16 by 4–4.5 μm and are elliptical.

The stipe is 5–15 cm (2–6 in) long and 1–3.5 cm (3/8–1 3/8 in) wide and slim, with white and dark to black flakes; it tapers upward. The basic mycelium is white.

The flesh is whitish, sometimes darkening following exposure. In young specimens, the meat is relatively firm, but it very soon becomes spongy and holds water, especially in rainy weather. When cooked, the meat turns black.

=== Similar species ===
Several different species of Leccinum mushrooms are found in mycorrhiza with birches, and can be confused by amateurs and mycologists alike. L. holopus is paler and whitish in all parts. L. alaskanum, common with birch in Alaska, has a dark and light, streaked or mottled cap. L. variicolor has a bluish stipe. L. oxydabile has firmer, pinkish flesh and a different pileus skin structure.

== Habitat and distribution ==
Leccinum scabrum is a European species that has been introduced to various areas of the world, mostly appearing in urban areas. In New Zealand, it associates solely with Betula pendula. In North America, it can be found from June to September, except on the West Coast, where it appears from September to November.

It grows in association with birch. It has been found in association with ornamental birch trees planted outside of its native range, such as in California.

== Edibility ==
The species is edible when firm, but some guides consider it unworthwhile. It can be cooked in various mushroom dishes or be pickled in brine or vinegar. It is commonly harvested for food in Finland and Russia.

== See also ==
- List of Leccinum species
- List of North American boletes
