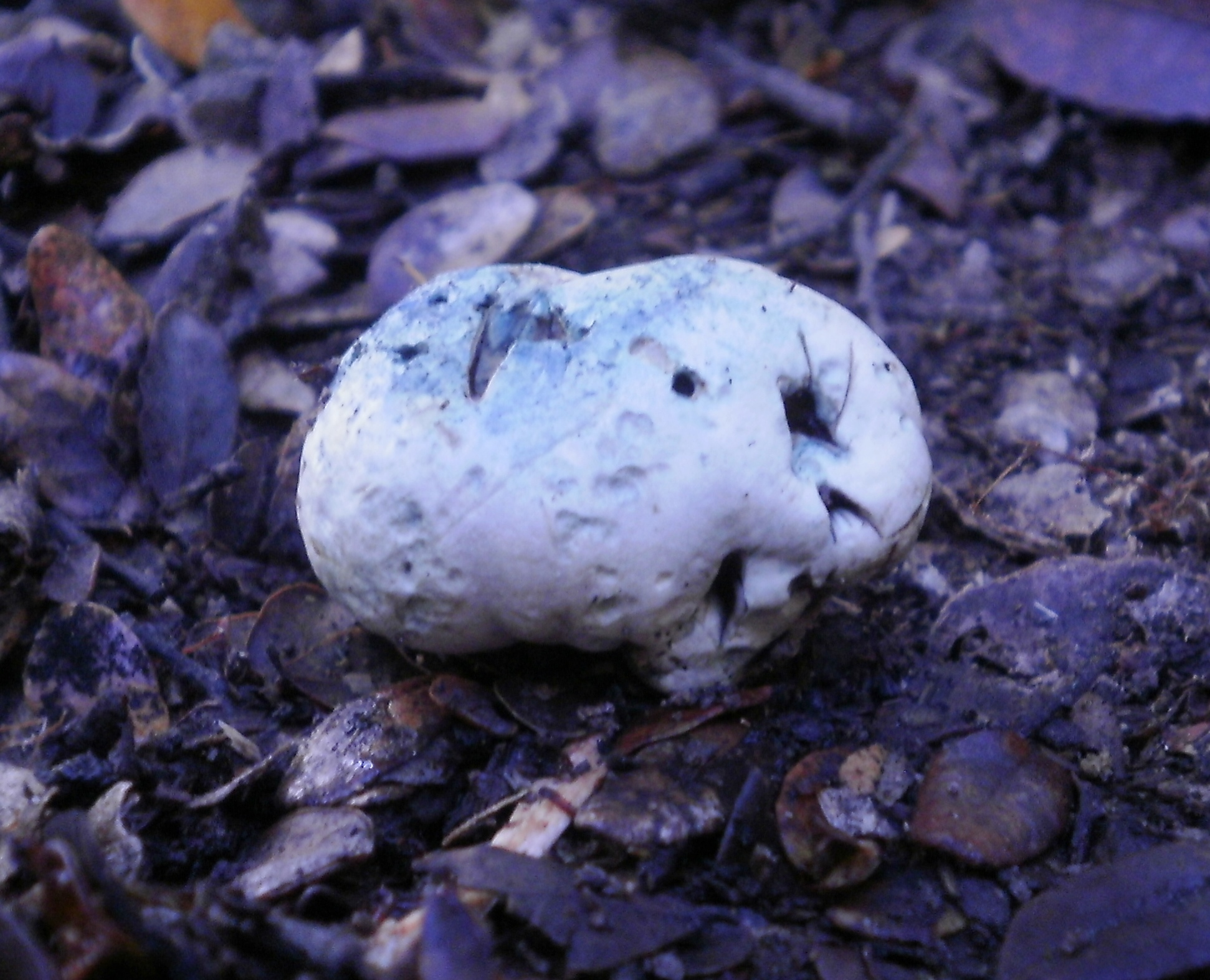
- Chamonixia pachydermis in beech forest in New Zealand

Scientific classification
- Domain: Eukaryota
- Kingdom: Fungi
- Division: Basidiomycota
- Class: Agaricomycetes
- Order: Boletales
- Family: Boletaceae
- Genus: Chamonixia; Rolland (1899)

Type species
- Chamonixia caespitosa Rolland (1899)

Species
- C. albida C. bispora C. brevicolumna C. caespitosa C. caudata C. mucosa C. octorugosa C. pachydermis C. vittatispora

= Chamonixia =

Genus of fungi

Chamonixia is a genus of truffle-like fungi in the family Boletaceae. The genus is widely distributed, especially in temperate regions, and contains eight species. Chamonixia was circumscribed by French mycologist Léon Louis Rolland in 1899.
