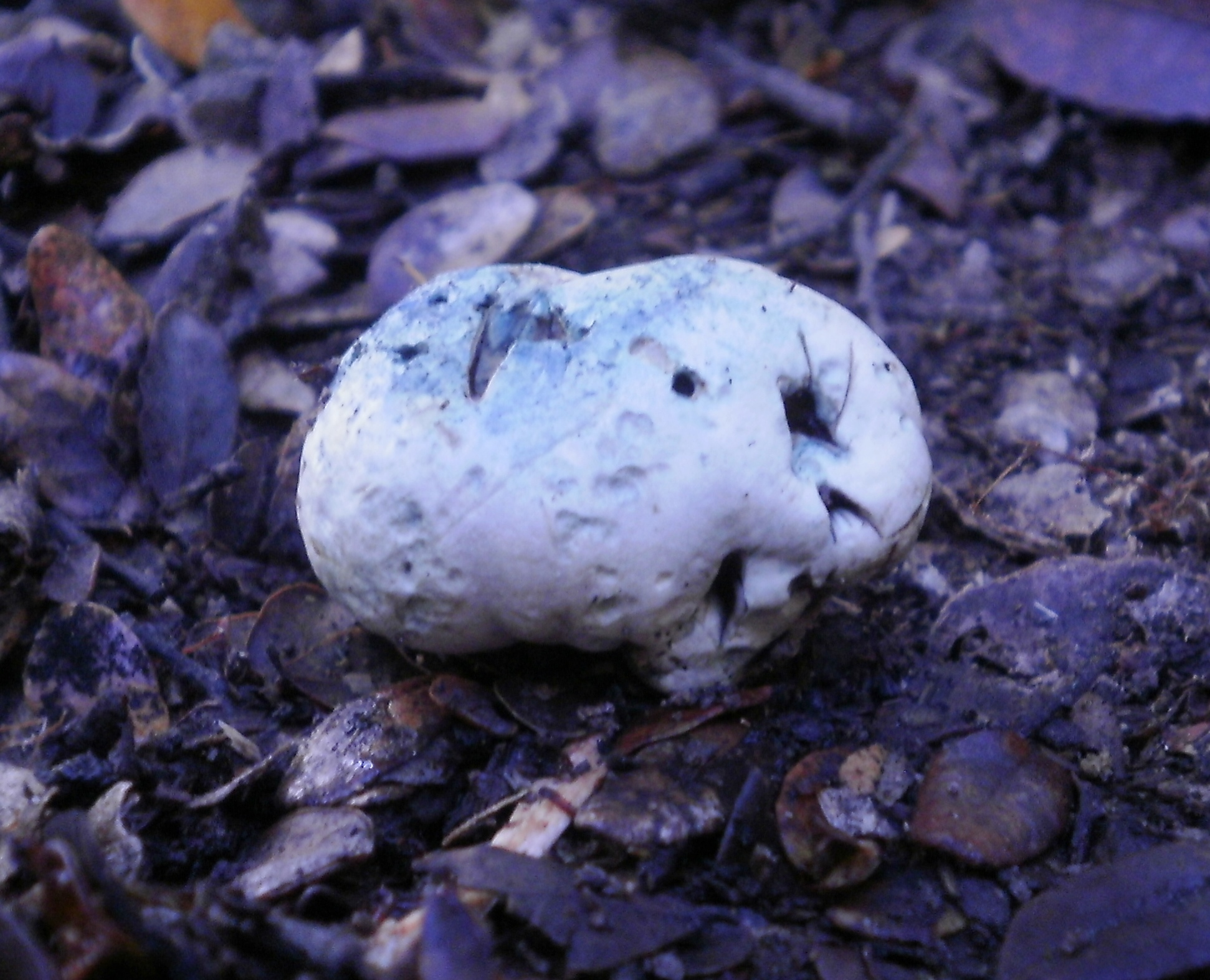

Scientific classification
- Kingdom: Fungi
- Division: Basidiomycota
- Class: Agaricomycetes
- Order: Boletales
- Family: Boletaceae
- Genus: Chamonixia
- Species: C. pachydermis

Binomial name
- Chamonixia pachydermis (Zeller & C.W. Dodge) G.W. Beaton, Pegler & T.W.K. Young

= Chamonixia pachydermis =

Species of fungus

Chamonixia pachydermis, is a species of fungus in the family Boletaceae, found in New Zealand.

Chamonixia pachydermis is common in areas of New Zealand beech forest and is often partially buried on the ground. It has a blue discoloration.

An unusual oxalylated tetramic acid can be extracted from it. A degradation product of this acid demonstrated some antibacterial properties towards Bacillus subtilis.
