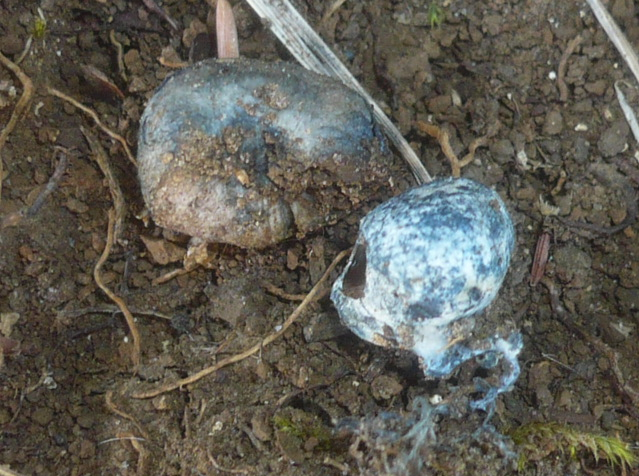

Conservation status
- Secure (NatureServe)

Scientific classification
- Domain: Eukaryota
- Kingdom: Fungi
- Division: Basidiomycota
- Class: Agaricomycetes
- Order: Boletales
- Family: Boletaceae
- Genus: Chamonixia
- Species: C. caespitosa

Binomial name
- Chamonixia caespitosa Rolland (1899)

Synonyms
- Hymenogaster caespitosus (Rolland) Soehner (1924)

= Chamonixia caespitosa =

Species of fungus

Chamonixia caespitosa is a species of secotioid fungus in the family Boletaceae. It was described as new to science in 1899 by French mycologist Léon Louis Rolland.
