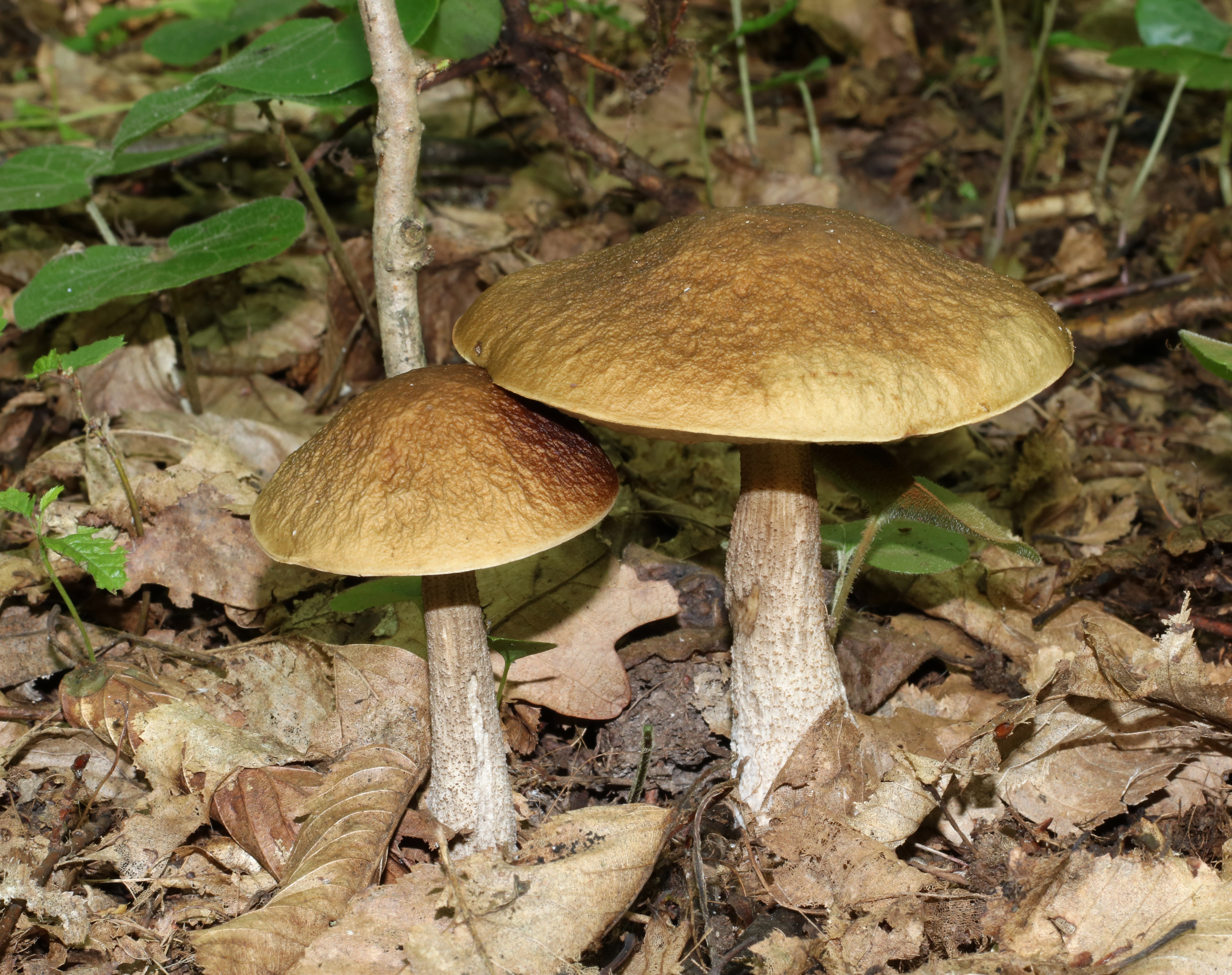

Scientific classification
- Kingdom: Fungi
- Division: Basidiomycota
- Class: Agaricomycetes
- Order: Boletales
- Family: Boletaceae
- Genus: Leccinellum
- Species: L. griseum

Binomial name
- Leccinellum griseum (Quél.) Bresinsky & Manfr. Binder (2003)

Synonyms
- List: Boletus leucophaeus; Boletus pseudoscaber Kall.; Gyroporus griseus; Leccinum carpini; Leccinum griseum (Quél.) Singer (1966)

= Leccinellum griseum =

Species of mushroom

Leccinellum griseum is a common, edible mushroom in the bolete family. It is found below hornbeam, usually in small groups.

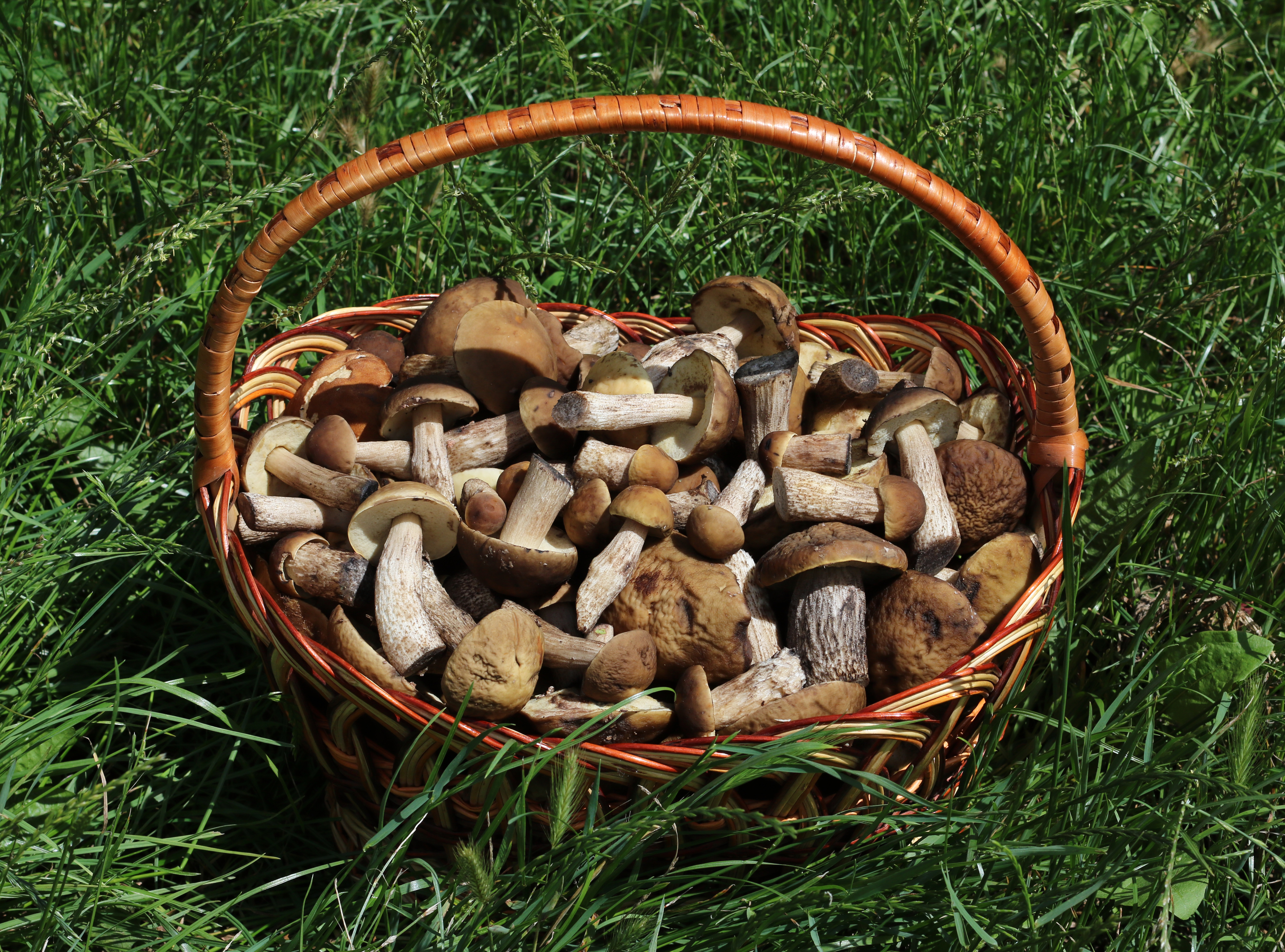
Leccinum griseum in basket. Ukraine

== Description ==
The cap is convex, usually grey-brown but can be light brown-to-olive. It grows up to 15 centimetres (5.9 in) in diameter. The stem is pale grey, rather long and slender with longitudinal furrows. The flesh is white, slowly turning grey-violet when cut, particularly in the stem, and it has a mild taste.
