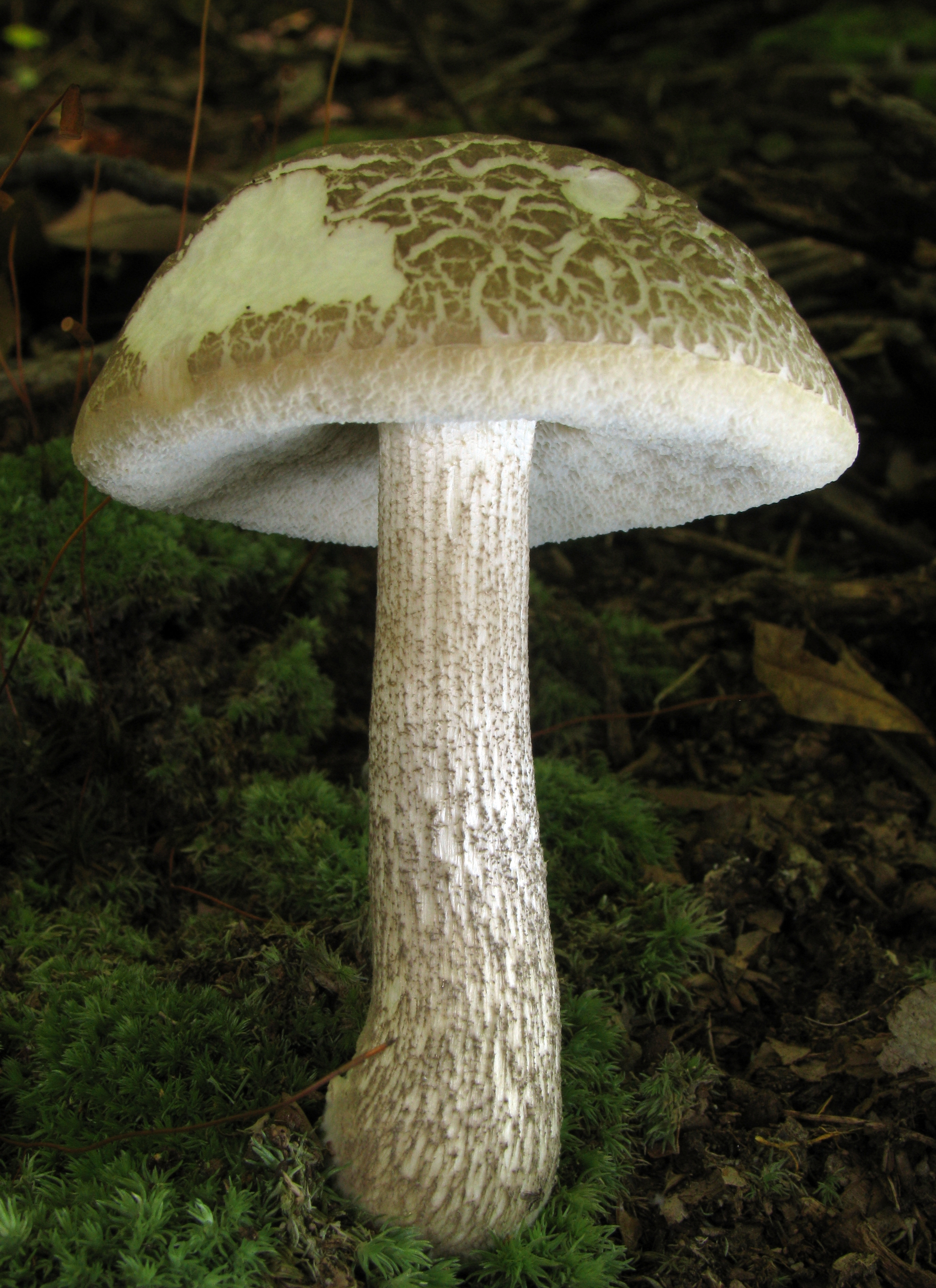
- Leccinellum albellum

Scientific classification
- Kingdom: Fungi
- Division: Basidiomycota
- Class: Agaricomycetes
- Order: Boletales
- Family: Boletaceae
- Genus: Leccinellum; Bresinsky & Manfr.Binder (2003)

Type species
- Leccinellum nigrescens (Richon & Roze) Bresinsky & Manfr.Binder (2003)

= Leccinellum =

Genus of fungi

Leccinellum is a genus of fungi in the family Boletaceae. Mycologists Andreas Bresinsky and Manfred Binder circumscribed the genus in 2003 to contain Leccinum species with a yellow pore surface and a trichoderm-like cap cuticle. Leccinellum nigrescens (originally Leccinum nigrescens Singer 1947) was designated the type species; this taxon has since been renamed to Leccinellum crocipodium (Letell.) Della Maggiora & Trassinelli.

The oak-associating Leccinellum quercophilum was described from the United States in 2013.

== Species ==
Image	Scientific name	Taxon author	Year	Distribution
	Leccinellum aberrans	(J. Blum) C. Hahn	2020 (1970)	United States
	Leccinellum albellum	(Peck) Bresinsky & Manfr. Binder	2003 (1888)	Hidalgo, Mexico, USA
	Leccinellum alborufescens	N.K. Zeng, R. Xue & S. Jiang	2019	China (Hainan)
	Leccinellum castaneum	Yan C. Li & Zhu L. Yang	2021	China
	Leccinellum citrinum	Yan C. Li & Zhu L. Yang	2021	China
	Leccinellum corsicum	(Rolland) Bresinsky & Manfr. Binder	2003 (1896)	Mediterranean Europe and North Africa
	Leccinellum cremeum	Zhu L. Yang & G. Wu	2016	China
	Leccinellum crocipodium	(Letell.) Bresinsky & Manfr. Binder	2003 (1835)	Belgium, France
	Leccinellum fujianense	N.K. Zeng, R. Xue & Zhi Q. Liang	2019	China (Fujian)
	Leccinellum griseopileatum	Yan C. Li & Zhu L. Yang	2021	China
	Leccinellum griseum	(Quél.) Bresinsky & Manfr. Binder	2003 (1901)	United States
	Leccinellum indoaurantiacum	D. Chakr., K. Das, Baghela, S.K. Singh & Dentinger	2016	India (Sikkim)
	Leccinellum lepidum	(H. Bouchet ex Essette) Bresinsky & Manfr. Binder	2003 (1965)	Corsica, Croatia, Cyprus, France and Greece
	Leccinellum luteoporum	(Bouchinot) Blanco-Dios	2018 (1904)	Europe
	Leccinellum luteoscabrum	(Schiffn.) Bresinsky & Manfr. Binder	2003 (1922)	
	Leccinellum luteum	(A.H. Sm., Thiers & Watling) Mikšík	2019 (1967)	Canada
	Leccinellum onychinum	Fang Li, Kuan Zhao & Qing Li Deng	2016	
	Leccinellum pseudoscabrum	(Kallenb.) Mikšík	2017 (1929)	northern and central Europe.
	Leccinellum quercophilum	M. Kuo	2013	United States
	Leccinellum rhodoporosum	(Har. Takah.) Har. Takah.	2016 (2007)	
	Leccinellum rugosiceps	(Peck) C. Hahn	2020 (1905)	Asia, North America, Central America, and South America
	Leccinellum sinoaurantiacum	(M. Zang & R.H. Petersen) Yan C. Li & Zhu L. Yang	2021 (2001)	China
	Leccinellum tlemcenense	(Maire) C. Hahn	2020 (1907)	
	Leccinellum viscosum	(Halling & B. Ortiz) Mikšík	2016 (2009)	Belize
