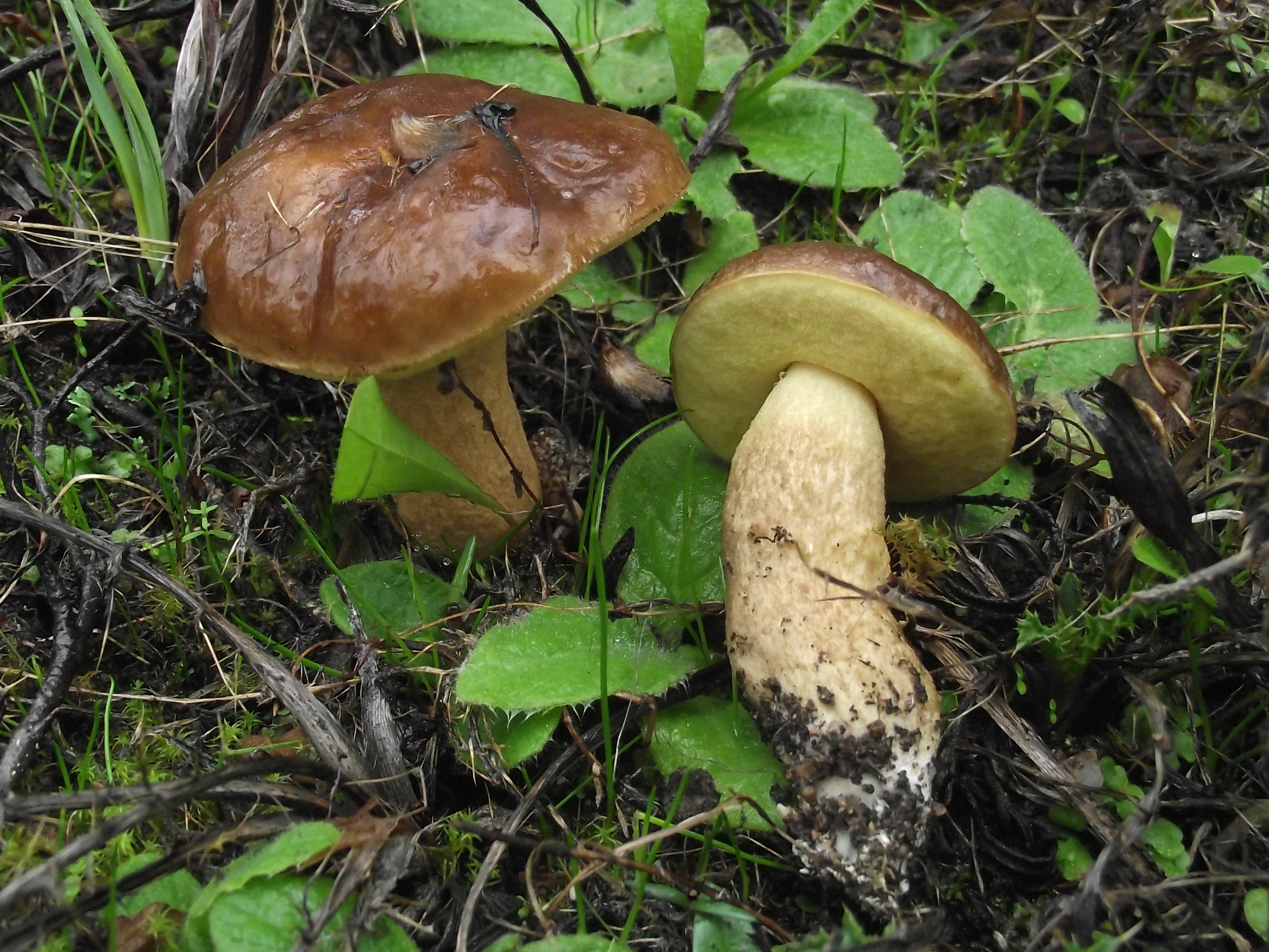

Scientific classification
- Domain: Eukaryota
- Kingdom: Fungi
- Division: Basidiomycota
- Class: Agaricomycetes
- Order: Boletales
- Family: Boletaceae
- Genus: Leccinellum
- Species: L. corsicum

Binomial name
- Leccinellum corsicum (Rolland) Bresinsky & Manfr.Binder (2003)

Synonyms
- Boletus corsicus Rolland (1896); Leccinum corsicum (Rolland) Singer (1967); Leccinum crocipodium var. corsicum (Rolland) Bertault (1980); Krombholziella corsica (Rolland) Alessio (1985)

= Leccinellum corsicum =

Species of fungus

Leccinellum corsicum is a species of bolete fungus in the family Boletaceae. It grows in mycorrhizal symbiosis exclusively with rockroses (Cistus species) in Mediterranean Europe and North Africa. The fungus was originally described as new to science in 1896 by French mycologist Léon Louis Rolland as a species of Boletus. Andreas Bresinsky and Manfred Binder transferred it to the newly circumscribed genus Leccinellum in 2003.

The bolete is edible, and is especially appreciated in Portugal.
