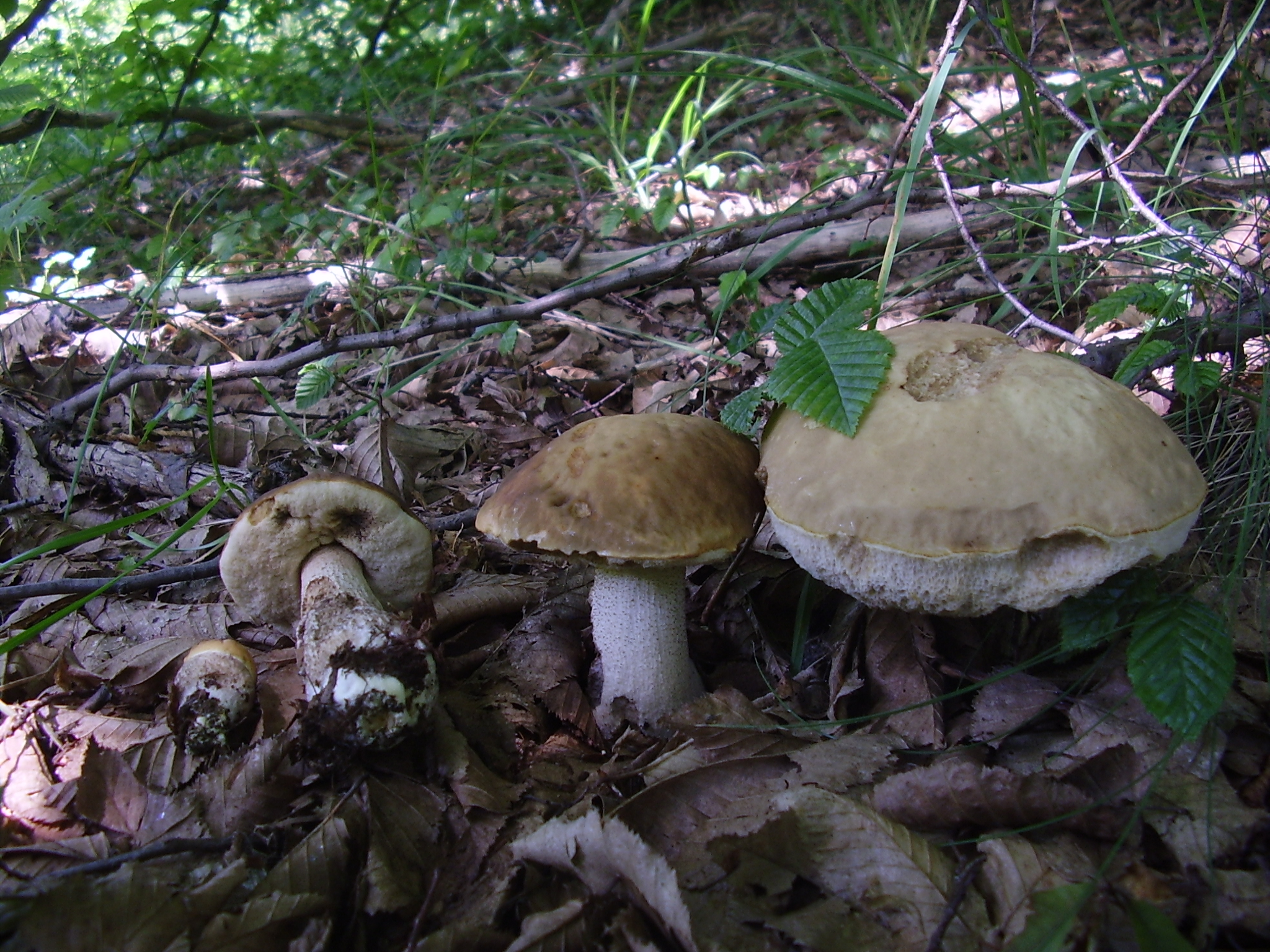

Scientific classification
- Domain: Eukaryota
- Kingdom: Fungi
- Division: Basidiomycota
- Class: Agaricomycetes
- Order: Boletales
- Family: Boletaceae
- Genus: Leccinellum
- Species: L. pseudoscabrum

Binomial name
- Leccinellum pseudoscabrum (Kallenb.) Mikšík (2017)

Synonyms
- Leccinum brunneobadium (J. Blum) Lannoy & Estadès (1994)

= Leccinellum pseudoscabrum =

Species of fungus

Leccinellum pseudoscabrum Mycological characteristics
- Pores on hymenium
- Cap is convex
- Hymenium is adnate
- Stipe is bare
- Ecology is mycorrhizal
- Edibility is edible

Leccinellum pseudoscabrum is an edible species of fungus in the bolete family.
