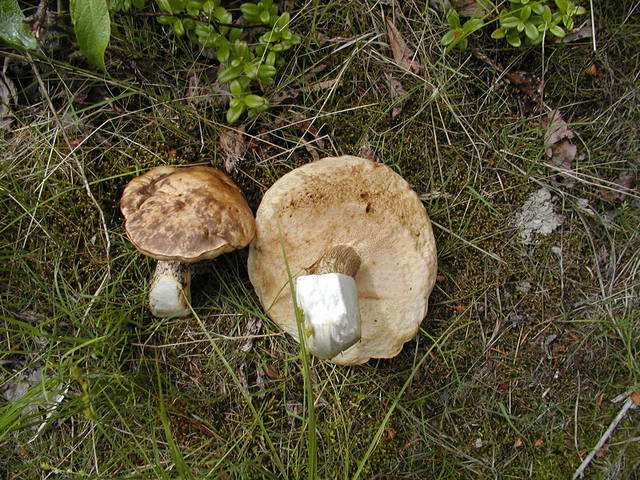

Scientific classification
- Domain: Eukaryota
- Kingdom: Fungi
- Division: Basidiomycota
- Class: Agaricomycetes
- Order: Boletales
- Family: Boletaceae
- Genus: Leccinum
- Species: L. alaskanum

Binomial name
- Leccinum alaskanum V.L.Wells & Kempton (1975)

= Leccinum alaskanum =

Species of fungus

Leccinum alaskanum is a species of bolete fungus in the family Boletaceae. Found in Alaska, it was described as new to science in 1975.
