= Leccinellum viscosum =

Scientific classification
- Domain: Eukaryota
- Kingdom: Fungi
- Division: Basidiomycota
- Class: Agaricomycetes
- Order: Boletales
- Family: Boletaceae
- Genus: Leccinellum
- Species: L. viscosum

Binomial name
- Leccinellum viscosum (Halling & B.Ortiz, 2009) Mikšík

Synonyms
- Leccinum viscosum Halling & B.Ortiz, 2009

Species of fungus

Leccinellum viscosum is a species of fungus in the bolete family. Found in Belize, it grows in sandy soil near Pinus caribaea and Quercus peduncularis. It was described as new to science in 2009 by mycologists Roy Halling and Beatriz Ortiz.
