= Léon Louis Rolland =

French mycologist (1841–1912)

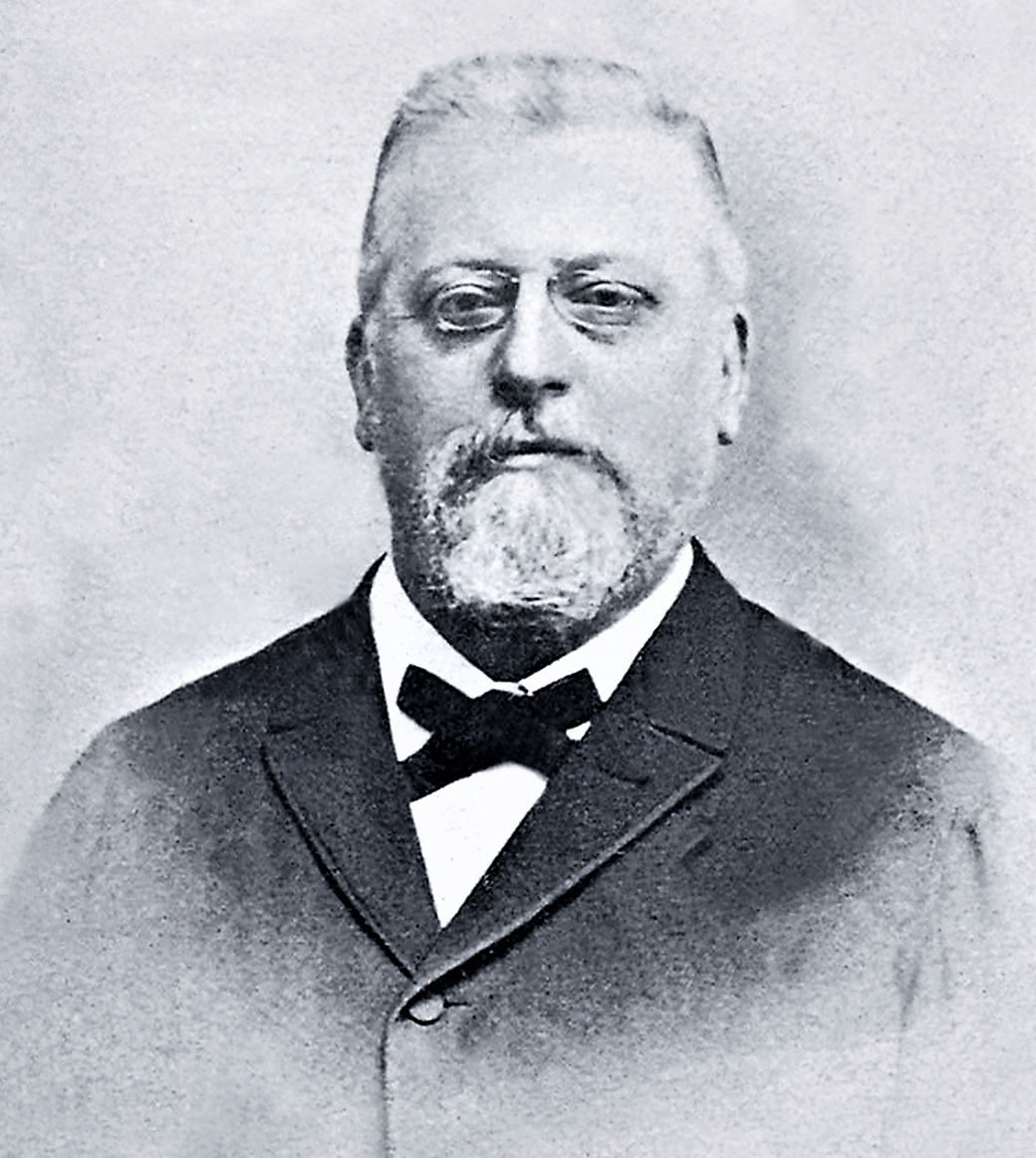
- Born: 10 December 1841; La Haie-Longue, Saint-Aubin-de-Luigné
- Died: 11 June 1912 (aged 70); Neuilly-sur-Seine
- Education: Collège Rollin
- Known for: Author of species definitions
- Scientific career
- Fields: Mycology
- Author abbrev. (botany): Rolland

Léon Louis Rolland (10 December 1841 – 11 June 1912) was a French mycologist.

== Early life ==
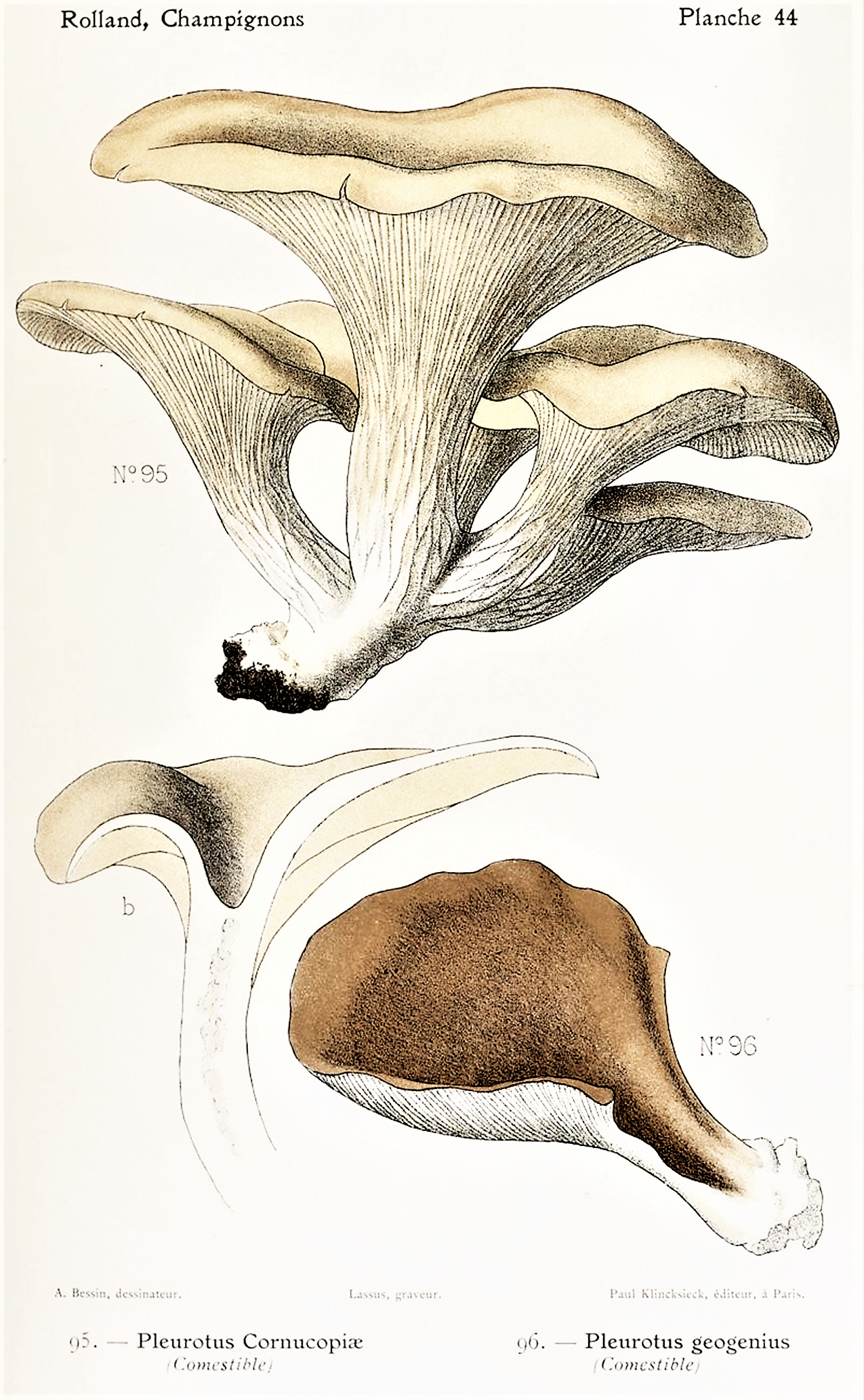
Rolland: Pleurotus cornucopuiae

Rolland, whose father was an engineer and director of the coal mines in the region, began his secondary education at the lycée (high school) of Angers, then that of Meaux, and finally the famous Collège-lycée Jacques-Decour in Paris, then called the Collège Rollin, where he took the baccalauréat. After that from 1866 to 1879 he spent several years in Le Havre, where his father was at that time first deputy.

Meanwhile, Rolland developed an extreme passion for mathematics to such an extent that his health suffered and he was forced to give it up and take a break. He continued to live in Le Havre and after the death of his father there he got to know a pharmacist who studied mushrooms using the book by Krombholz. He became enraptured by mycology and when the Krombholz book was insufficient, he consulted the mycologist Gillet who became a close acquaintance. In 1879 he moved to Paris with his mother and after her death he moved to Neuilly-sur-Seine where he lived alone until his death.

== Career ==
In Paris he became friendly with the pharmacologist and mycologist Émile Boudier, who was later to write his obituary in the Bulletin of the Société mycologique de France. Rolland was an enthusiastic member of the latter society, never missing a conference, and published numerous papers in its bulletin; also he was president for a time. He was able to live from his investments and made mycological trips in France and abroad, for instance to Chamonix, Morocco, Algeria, and the Balearic Islands including the valley of Sóller. He corresponded with the collector and co-founder of the Lyon Linnaean Society, Philibert Riel, on specimens from around Chamonix, and he contributed to the Lyon "Revue Mycologique".

In his final years his health was poor and he was nursed by a loyal housemaid who had served him for 20 years. He left a sister, whom he loved very much, and several devoted nephews and nieces.

His main œuvre was his "Atlas des champignons de France, Suisse et Belgique" ("Atlas of the fungi of France, Switzerland and Belgium"), which covered 283 species, having originally been published in 15 parts from 1906 until 1910, each with 8 plates, and finally summarised in two volumes in 1910. The 120 chrome-lithographic watercolour plates were created by the illustrator A. Bessin, who also illustrated Paul Dumée's mushroom book. For this work Rolland was awarded an honorary diploma at the "Universal Exhibition of Turin" (1911), where it was exhibited.

== Selected genera and species of which Rolland was the original author ==
Note that due to more modern taxonomic viewpoints, the genus name of a fungus has often changed from that which was initially given. In such a case, the original author of the species is still recorded in the attribution in parentheses before the author of the new genus/species combination.

=== Genus ===
- Chamonixia Rolland (1899)

=== Species ===
- Leccinellum corsicum (Rolland) Bresinsky & Manfr. Binder
- Suillus plorans (Rolland) Kuntze
- Chamonixia caespitosa Rolland (1899)
- Ganoderma lionnetii Rolland (1901)
- Lactarius porninsis Rolland (1889)
- Pleurotus cornucopiae (Paulet) Rolland (1910)

== Selected publications ==
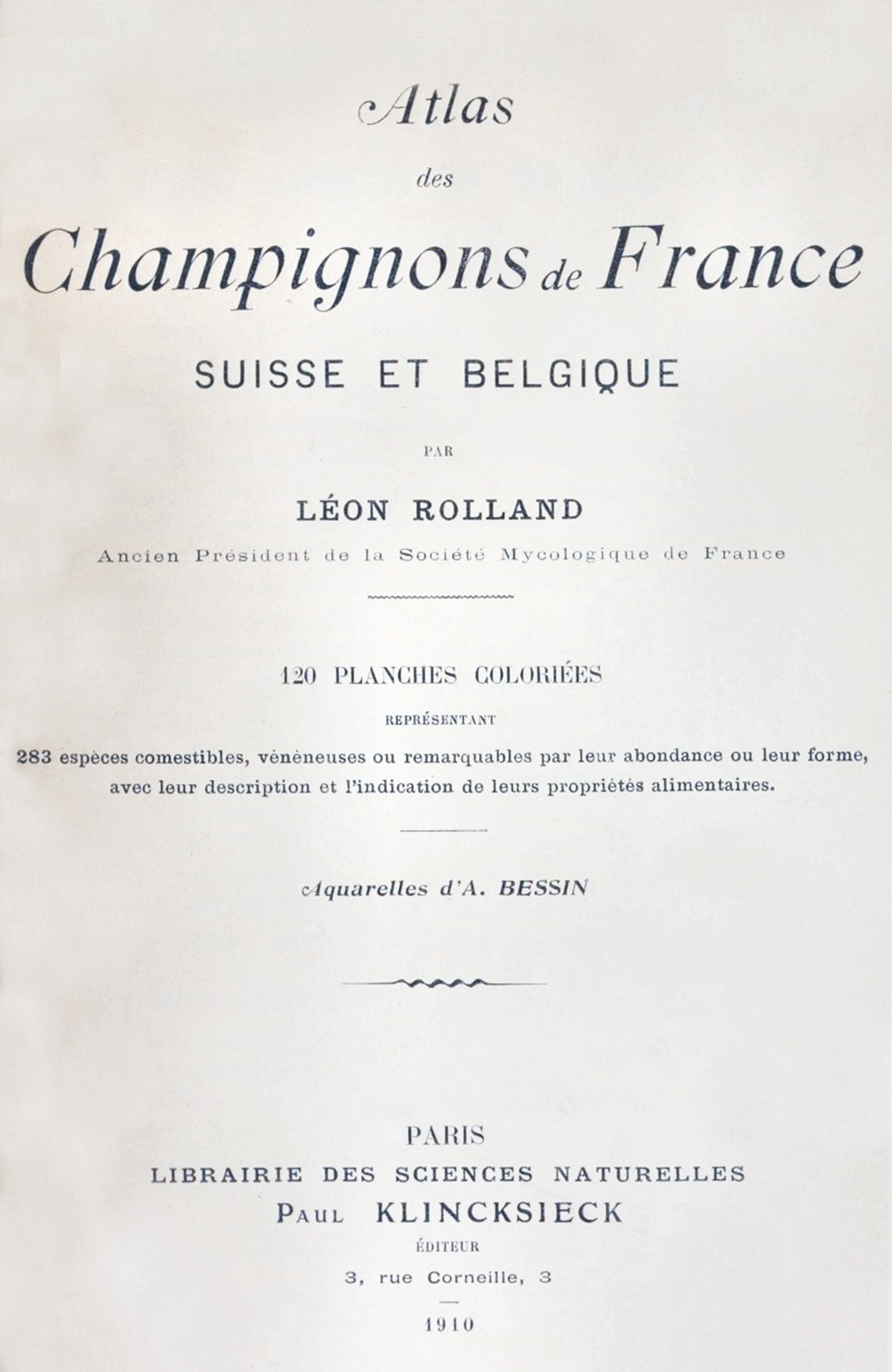
Rolland: Atlas des Champignons

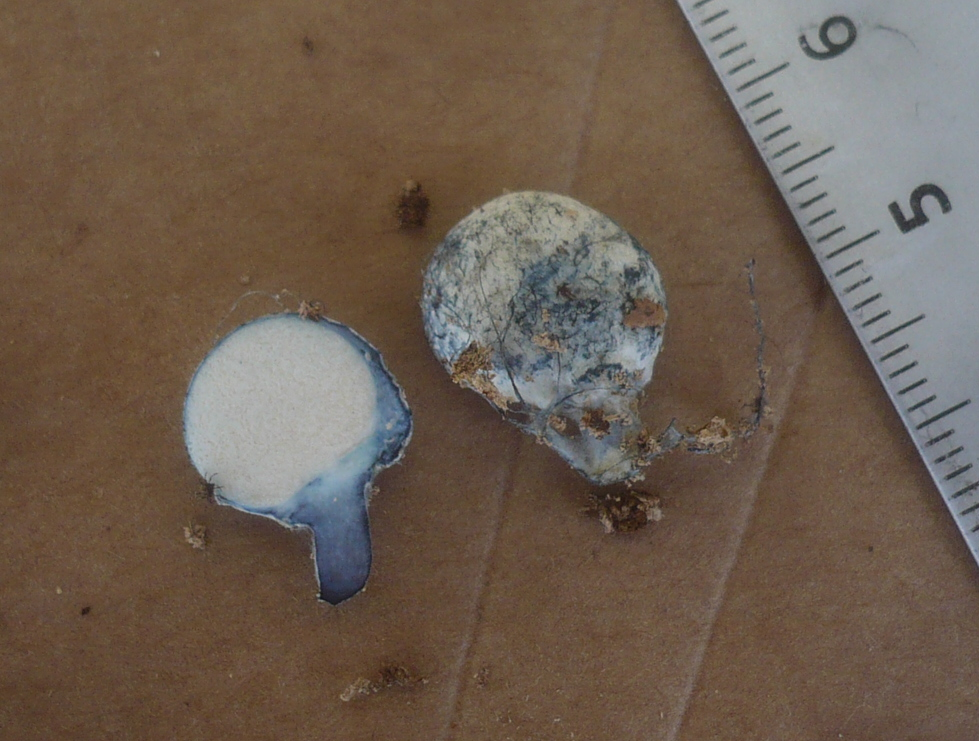
Chamonixia caespitosa

See Boudier for a complete list. Apart from the Atlas, all the items were published in "Bulletin trimestriel de la Société mycologique de France".

- "Essai d'un calendrier des champignons comestibles des environs de Paris", Bulletin 1887, vol. III, p. 73, later continued in volumes V, VI, VII, VIII & IX.
- "Excursion a Zermatt (Suisse). Cinq champignons nouveaux", Bulletin 1889, vol. V-1, p. 164.
- "Excursions à Chamonix Eté et Automne de 1898", Bulletin 1899, vol. XV, p. 73-78.
- "Une nouvelle espèce de "Ganoderma", Bulletin 1901, vol. XVI-2, p. 180. Original description of Ganoderma lionnetii.
- "Photographie des Champignons - Procédé par la décoloration et la teinture", Bulletin 1902, vol. XVIII, p. 27.
- "Champignons des îles Baléares", Bulletin 1904, vol. XX.
- "Atlas des champignons de France, Suisse et Belgique.
