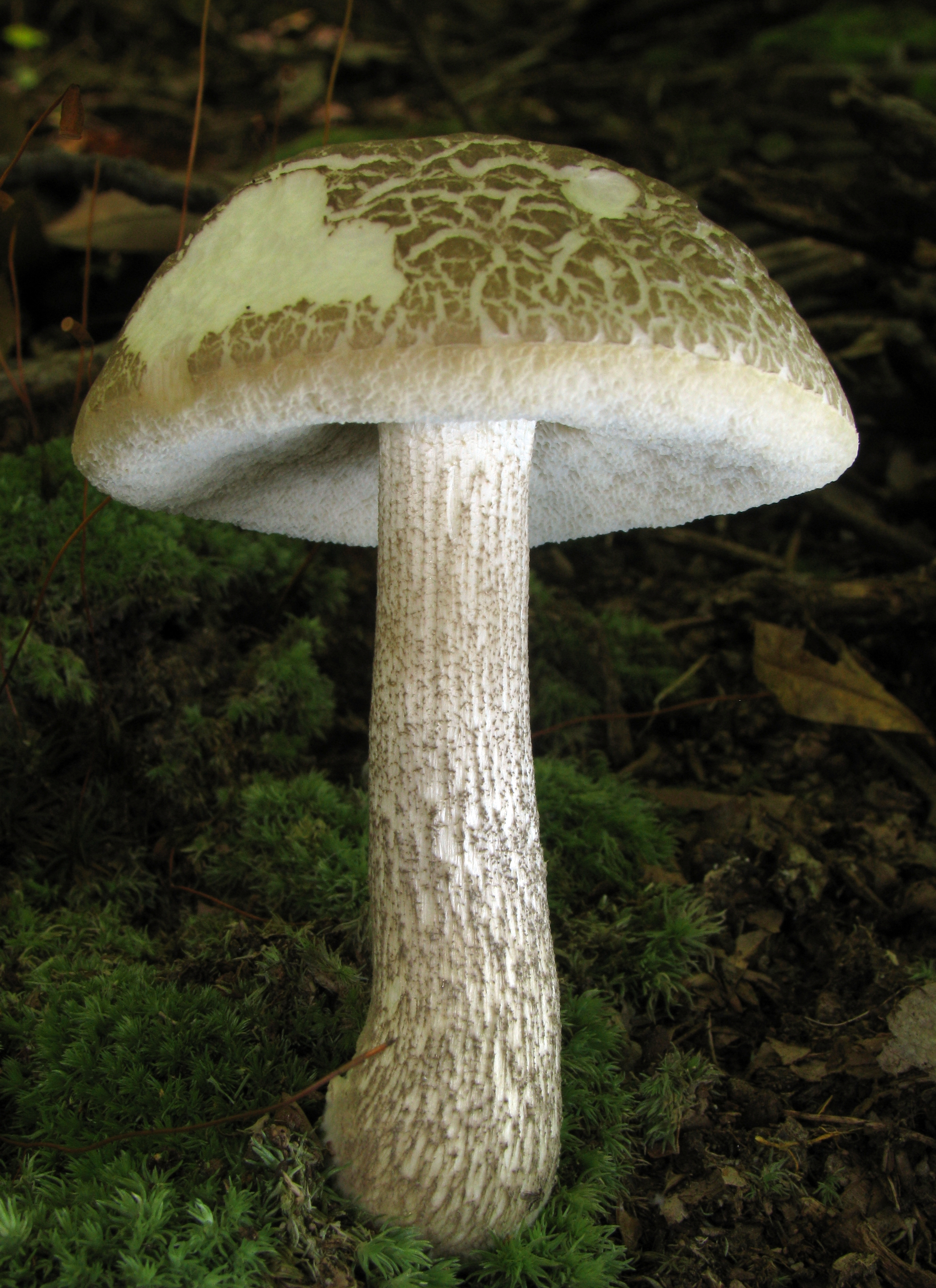

Scientific classification
- Domain: Eukaryota
- Kingdom: Fungi
- Division: Basidiomycota
- Class: Agaricomycetes
- Order: Boletales
- Family: Boletaceae
- Genus: Leccinellum
- Species: L. albellum

Binomial name
- Leccinellum albellum (Peck) Bresinsky & Manfr.Binder (2003)

Synonyms
- Boletus albellus Peck (1888); Ceriomyces albellus (Peck) Murrill (1909); Leccinum albellum (Peck) Singer (1945); Krombholziella albella (Peck) Šutara (1982)

= Leccinellum albellum =

Species of fungus

Leccinellum albellum is a species of bolete fungus in the family Boletaceae.

== Taxonomy ==
Originally described by Charles Horton Peck as a species of Boletus, and, after 1945, usually considered a species of Leccinum, it was transferred to the newly created genus Leccinellum in 2003. The bolete was reported from a Mexican beech (Fagus mexicana) forest in Hidalgo, Mexico in 2010.

== Description ==
The light brown cap is 3–7 centimetres (1 1/4–2 3/4 in) wide. The stem is 5–9 cm (2–3 1/2 in) tall and 7–15 millimetres (1/4–1/2 in) thick. The flesh is whitish and the spore print is olive brown.

=== Similar species ===
It can resemble Boletus barrowsii, Gyroporus subalbellus, Imleria pallida, Leccinum holopus, Tylopilus rhoadsiae, and Xanthoconium stramineum.

== Distribution and habitat ==
From July to September, it can be found in eastern North America under hardwood, especially oak.

== See also ==
- List of North American boletes
