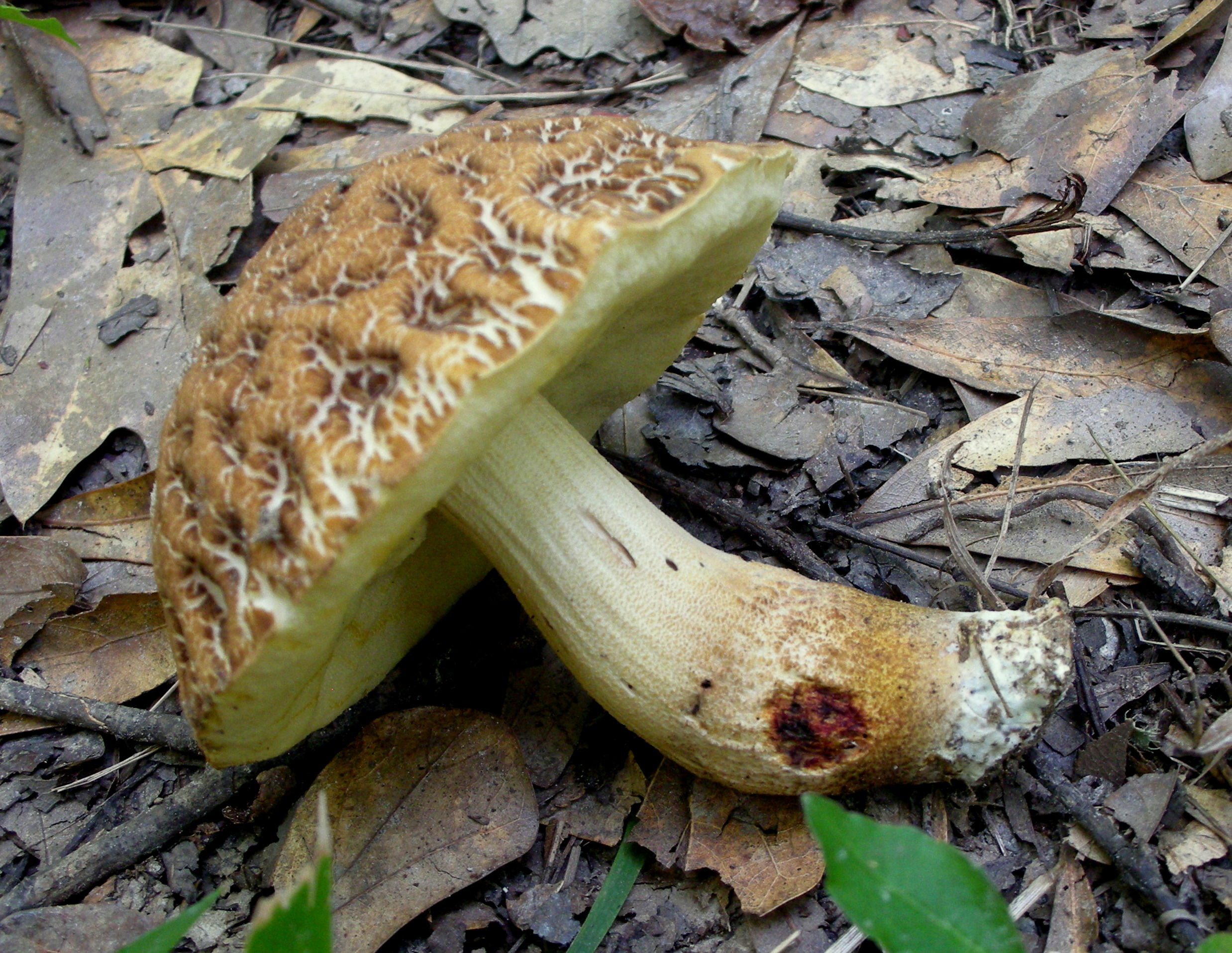

Scientific classification
- Domain: Eukaryota
- Kingdom: Fungi
- Division: Basidiomycota
- Class: Agaricomycetes
- Order: Boletales
- Family: Boletaceae
- Genus: Leccinellum
- Species: L. crocipodium

Binomial name
- Leccinellum crocipodium (Letell.) Bresinsky & Manfr. Binder (2003)

Synonyms
- Boletus crocipodius Letell. (1838); Boletus tessellatus Gillet (1878); Boletus nigrescens Richon & Roze (1888); Krombholzia crocipodia (Letell.) E.-J. Gilbert (1931); Krombholziella crocipodia (Letell.) Maire (1937); Trachypus crocipodius (Letell.) Romagn. (1939); Leccinum nigrescens Singer (1947); Leccinum crocipodium (Letell.) Watling (1961); Krombholziella nigrescens (Singer) Šutara (1982); Leccinellum nigrescens (Singer) Bresinsky & Manfr. Binder (2003)

= Leccinellum crocipodium =

Species of fungus

Leccinellum crocipodium Mycological characteristics
- Pores on hymenium
- Cap is convex
- Hymenium is adnate
- Stipe is bare
- Ecology is mycorrhizal
- Edibility is edible

Leccinellum crocipodium is a species of bolete fungus in the family Boletaceae. Fruitbodies contain a benzotropolone pigment called crocipodin.
