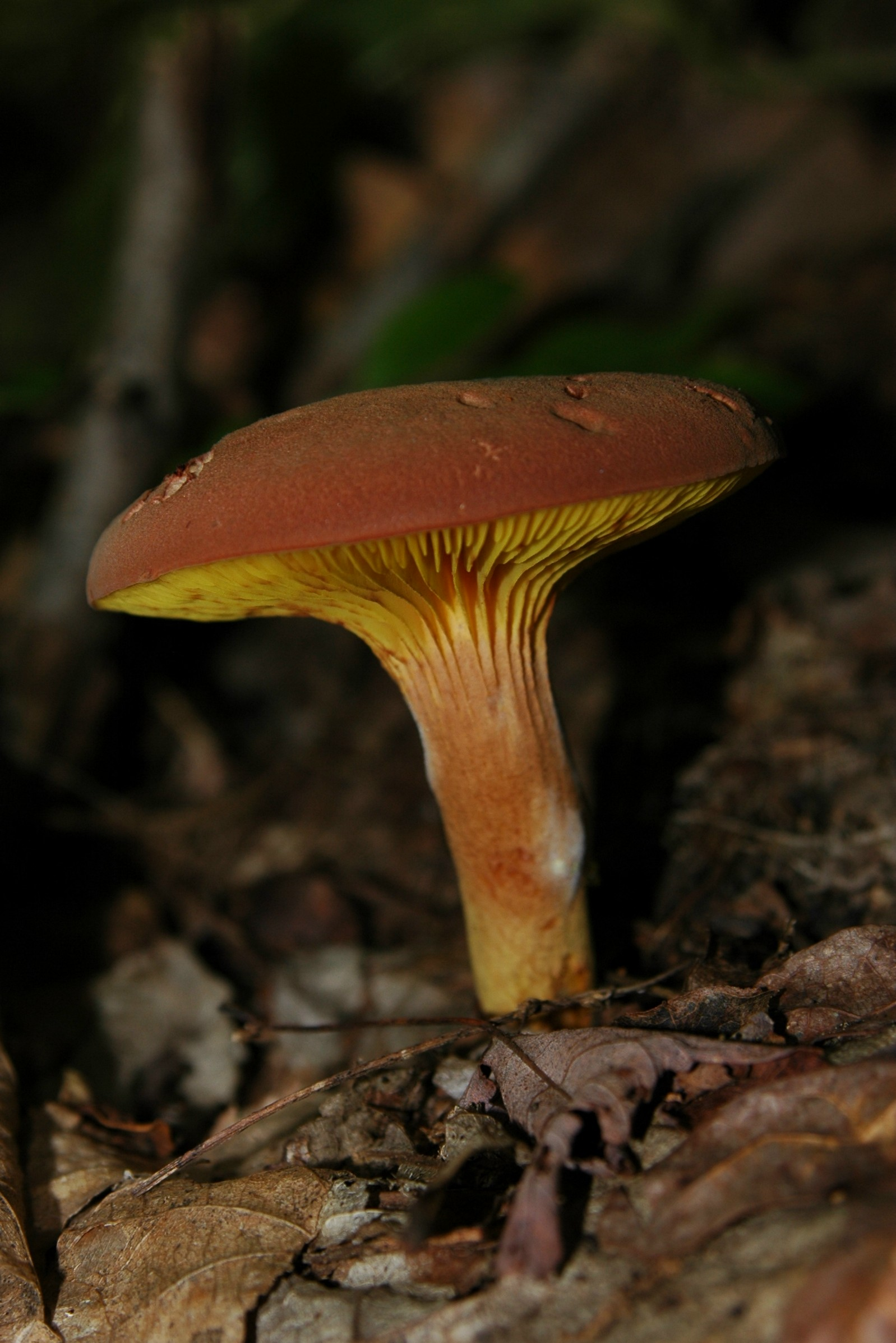

Scientific classification
- Domain: Eukaryota
- Kingdom: Fungi
- Division: Basidiomycota
- Class: Agaricomycetes
- Order: Boletales
- Family: Boletaceae
- Genus: Phylloporus
- Species: P. leucomycelinus

Binomial name
- Phylloporus leucomycelinus Singer (1978)

Synonyms
- P. rhodoxanthus ssp. leucomycelinus Singer

= Phylloporus leucomycelinus =

Species of fungus

Phylloporus leucomycelinus is a species of bolete fungus in the family Boletaceae. First described in 1978, it is found in eastern North America and the Philippines.

== Taxonomy ==
The species was first described scientifically by American mycologist Rolf Singer in 1978.

Molecular analysis of the genus Phylloporus shows that P. leucomycelinus and a group of phylogenetically related species (P. bellus, P. rhodoxanthus, P. dimorphus, and P. castanopsidis) form a well-supported clade. In a separate study, P. leucomycelinus was shown to be closely related to the Panamanian species P. caballeroi.

== Description ==
The cap is initially convex before flattening out in maturity, sometimes developing a shallow depression; it reaches a diameter of 4–8 centimetres (1 1/2–3 inches). The cap surface is dry, with a somewhat felt-like texture, and it often develops cracks in maturity. Its color is dark red to reddish chestnut, usually with a paler central portion in mature individuals. The flesh is whitish to pale yellow, and lacks any distinctive taste or odor. The pores on the underside of the cap are quite gill-like, and decurrent (running down the length of the stem). They are yellow in color, sometimes forked, and have cross-veins in the intervening spaces. The stem measures 4–8 cm (1 1/2–3 1/4 in) long by 0.5–1.3 cm (1/4–1/2 in) thick, and is nearly equal in width throughout or thicker near the base. It often has ribs near the top, and the surface has small brown dots and points. The overall stem color is yellow with reddish tinges. There is white mycelium at the stem base.

Phylloporus leucomycelinus produces a yellowish spore print. Spores are roughly elliptical to spindle-shaped, smooth, and measure 8–14 by 3–5 μm. The basidia (spore-bearing cells) are ventricose (swollen in the middle), four-spored, and measure 20–25 by 6–7 μm.

== Distribution and habitat ==
The fruit bodies of P. leucomycelinus grow scattered or in groups on the ground in deciduous forests, usually near beech and oak trees. Found in North America, its range includes eastern Canada south to Florida, and west to Michigan. The bolete was reported from a Mexican beech (Fagus mexicana) forest in Hidalgo, Mexico in 2010. It has also been collected in the Philippines.

== Uses ==
The mushrooms are edible. Fruit bodies can be used in mushroom dyeing to produce beige, gold, or greenish-beige colors, depending on the mordant used.

== See also ==
- List of North American boletes
