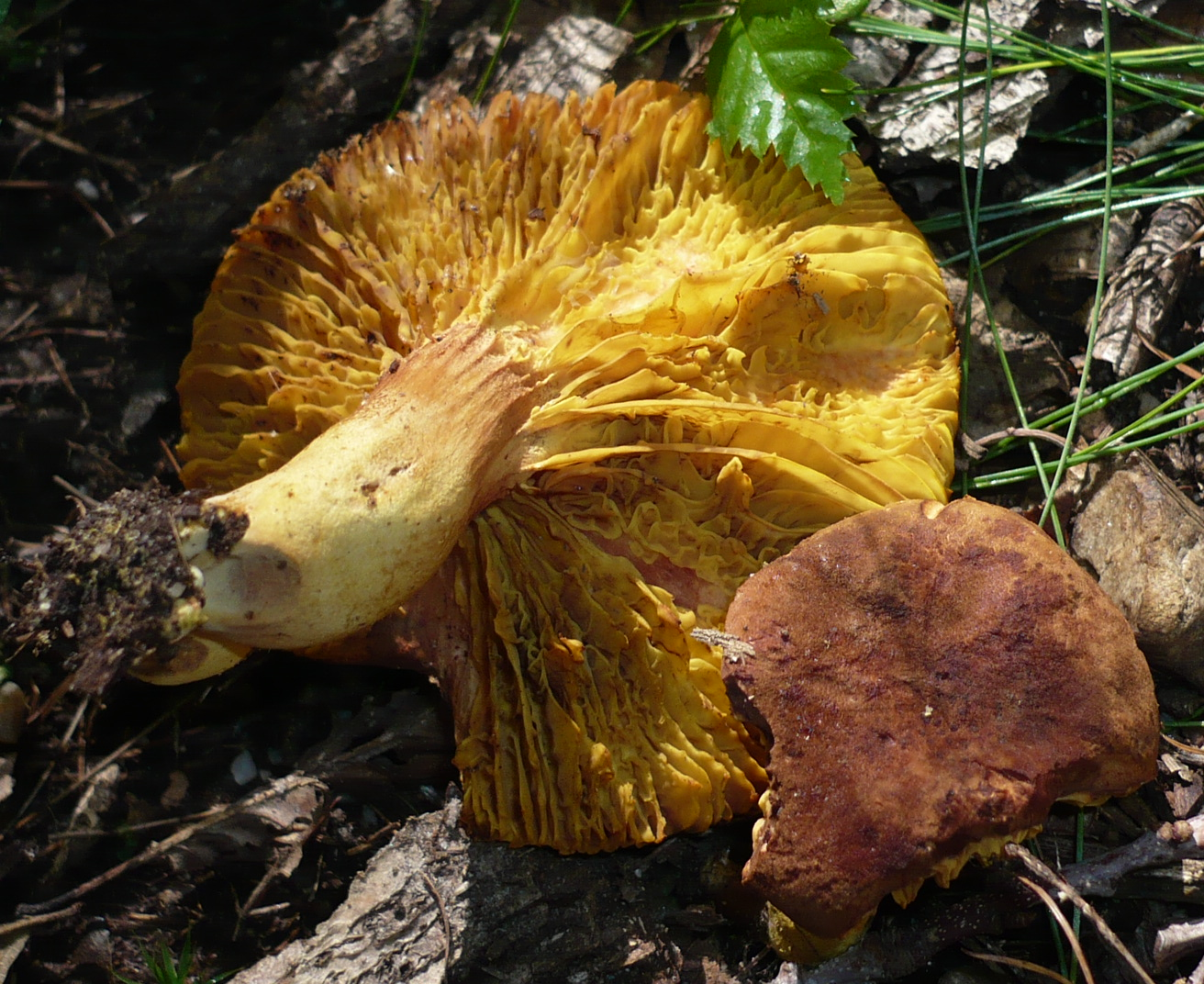

Conservation status
- Least Concern (IUCN 3.1)

Scientific classification
- Kingdom: Fungi
- Division: Basidiomycota
- Class: Agaricomycetes
- Order: Boletales
- Family: Boletaceae
- Genus: Phylloporus
- Species: P. pelletieri

Binomial name
- Phylloporus pelletieri (Lév.) Quél. (1888)

Synonyms
- Agaricus pelletieri Lév. (1867); Clitocybe pelletieri (Lév.) Gillet (1874); Paxillus pelletieri (Lév.) Velenovsky (1920); Xerocomus pelletieri (Lév.) Manfr.Binder (1999)

= Phylloporus pelletieri =

Species of fungus

Phylloporus pelletieri
- Mycological characteristics
- Gills on hymenium
- Cap is flat
- Hymenium is decurrent
- Stipe is bare
- Ecology is mycorrhizal

Phylloporus pelletieri, commonly known as the golden-gilled bolete, is a species of fungus in the family Boletaceae.

== Taxonomy ==
The species was first described by French mycologist Joseph-Henri Léveillé in 1867 under the name Agaricus pelletieri. Lucien Quélet transferred it to Phylloporus in 1888.

== Description ==
The underside of its cap bears lamellae (gill-like structures) rather than the pores common in the Boletales. The reddish, domed cap is smooth with a velvety texture, while the lamellae are bright yellow. The stem supporting the cap is also yellow with a red-brown veil.

== Distribution and habitat ==
The golden-gilled bolete forms mycorrhizal relationships with broadleaved trees such as beech and coniferous trees such as fir or pine. The fruit bodies are produced in summer and autumn.

Although rare, the golden-gilled bolete has a widespread distribution in Europe and reaches into Asia. It inhabits broadleaf or coniferous forests in montane or sub-alpine regions, where it is associated with acidic or sandy soils.

== Ecology ==
The species is threatened by air pollution and forestry plantations, which can destroy its natural habitat. It is short-listed for inclusion in Appendix I of the Convention on the Conservation of European Wildlife and Natural Habitats, otherwise known as the Bern Convention, by the European Council for Conservation of Fungi (ECCF), and included on the Red Lists of 12 European countries. Other conservation recommendations include the mapping of existing sites and a reduction in air pollution, together with restrictions on forestry practice at known locations.
