= Phylloporus novae-zelandiae =

- Phylloporus novae-zelandiae from Pupu Hydro station

Scientific classification
- Kingdom: Fungi
- Division: Basidiomycota
- Class: Agaricomycetes
- Order: Boletales
- Family: Boletaceae
- Genus: Phylloporus
- Species: P. novae-zelandiae

Binomial name
- Phylloporus novae-zelandiae McNabb (1971)

Species of fungus

Phylloporus novae-zelandiae is a species of fungus in the family Boletaceae. It was originally discovered in New Zealand in 1971. It was the first Phylloporus species to be described in New Zealand, although species had been observed previously.

It may be found under southern beech species.

The cap is dry and felted. It may be flat, curved, or dipped in the middle. When young, the cap will be dark brown. As it matures it pales to a cocoa, mid, or yellow brown.
