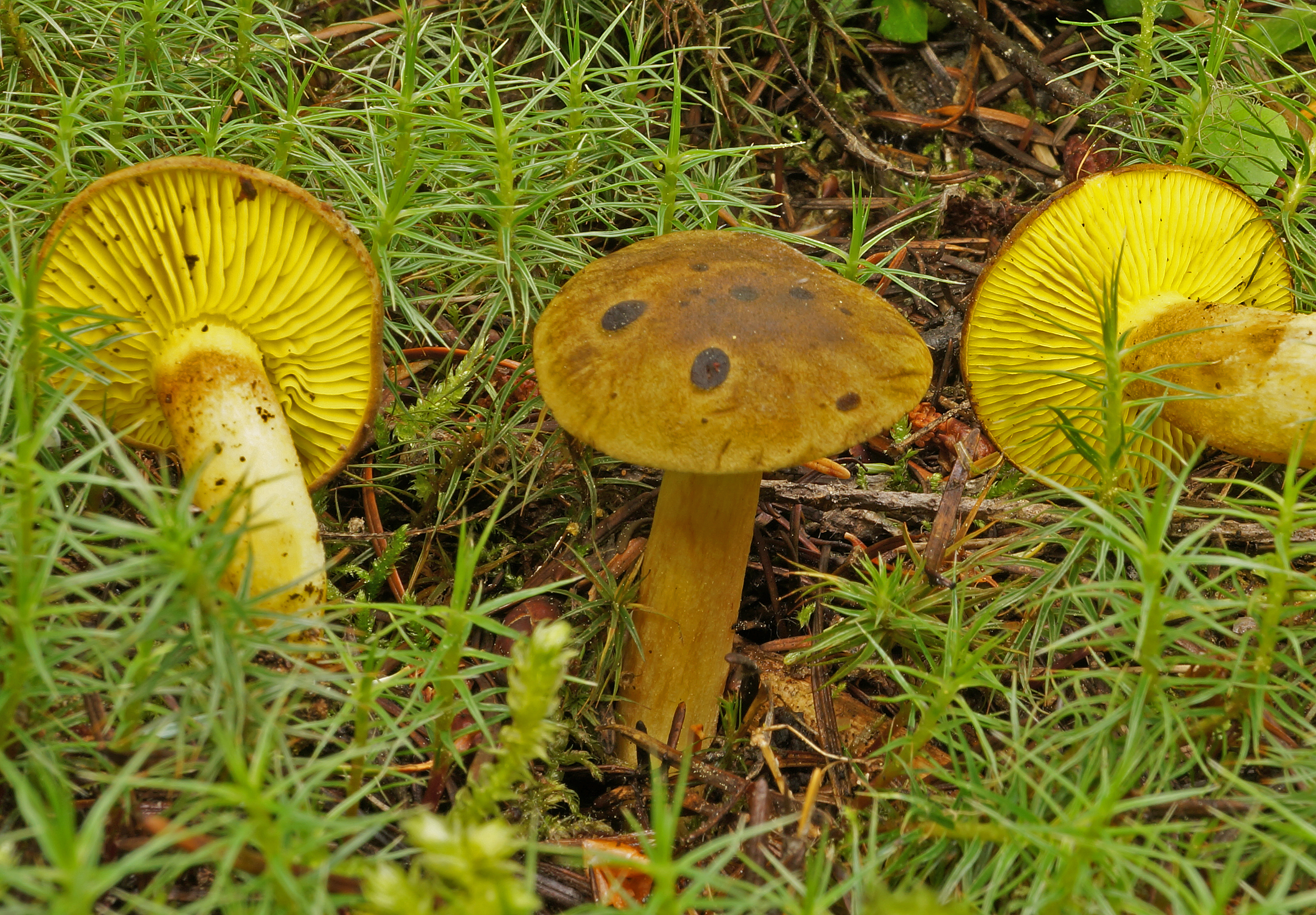

Scientific classification
- Kingdom: Fungi
- Division: Basidiomycota
- Class: Agaricomycetes
- Order: Boletales
- Family: Boletaceae
- Genus: Phylloporus
- Species: P. arenicola

Binomial name
- Phylloporus arenicola A.H.Sm. & Trappe (1972)

= Phylloporus arenicola =

Species of fungus

Phylloporus arenicola, commonly known as the western gilled bolete, is a species of bolete mushroom in the family Boletaceae. It is found in the Pacific Northwest region of western North America, where it grows in sand dunes in a mycorrhizal association with pine trees. It is one of only three North American Boletaceae species that occur in coastal sand dunes.

== Taxonomy ==
The species was described as new to science in 1972 by mycologists Alexander H. Smith and James Trappe. Smith made the type collection near Pacific City, Oregon, in November 1970. The specific epithet arenicola means "growing in sand".

== Description ==
The fruit bodies of Phylloporus arenicola have caps that are initially convex before flattening out in maturity, sometimes developing a central depression; the cap attains a diameter of 1.5–4.5 centimetres (1/2–2 inches). Its surface is dry and has a velvet-like texture, and its color ranges from dull olive initially (with a darker center) to olive-brown before finally fading to pale brown. The whitish to yellowish flesh does not change color when exposed to air and lacks any distinctive taste or odor. The pore surface on the underside of the cap is initially bright yellow but fades somewhat as it matures. The pores, which resemble the gills found in agaric fungi, comprise tubes that extend 3–7 millimetres (1/8–1/4 in) deep. The stipe measures 4–6 cm (1 1/2–2 1/4 in) long by 5–8 mm (1/4–3/8 in) thick and is thicker near the base. It is solid (i.e., not hollow), dry, and has a dull yellow base color that is partially covered by reddish-brown dots (pruina) and fibers. In the base of the stipe, the internal tissue is bright red, while near in the upper part of the stipe it is pale yellow.

The spores are somewhat elliptical to spindle-shaped (tapered on each end), smooth, and have dimensions of 9–12 by 4–5 μm. The club-shaped basidia (spore-bearing cells) are four-spored and measure 38–60 by 9–13 μm. There are no clamp connections in the hyphae. When the cap cuticle is tested with an ammonia solution, it turns a violet, brownish gray color. The spore print is olive brown.

=== Similar species ===
It resembles P. rhodoxanthus, which has reddish caps.

Phylloporus arenicola
- Mycological characteristics
- Gills on hymenium
- Cap is convex or flat
- Hymenium is sinuate or decurrent
- Stipe is bare
- Spore print is olive-brown
- Ecology is mycorrhizal
- Edibility is edible

== Distribution and habitat ==
Fruit bodies grow singly, scattered, or in groups on the

ground in sand dunes. A mycorrhizal species, Phylloporus arenicola forms associations with pine trees. The fungus, found in the Pacific Northwest region of the western North America, has been recorded from California, Oregon, and Washington. It is found from July to September in the Mountain states and November–May on the West Coast.

P. arenicola is one of only three North American Boletaceae species that occur in coastal sand dunes; the others are Leccinum arenicola, found in New Brunswick, Canada, and Boletus abruptibulbus, described from the Gulf Coast of the Florida panhandle.

== See also ==
- List of North American boletes
