= Phylloporus scabripes =

Scientific classification
- Domain: Eukaryota
- Kingdom: Fungi
- Division: Basidiomycota
- Class: Agaricomycetes
- Order: Boletales
- Family: Boletaceae
- Genus: Phylloporus
- Species: P. scabripes

Binomial name
- Phylloporus scabripes B.Ortiz (2007)

Species of fungus

Phylloporus scabripes is a species of bolete fungus in the family Boletaceae. Found in Belize on sandy soil under Quercus spp. and Pinus caribaea, it was described as new to science in 2007.
