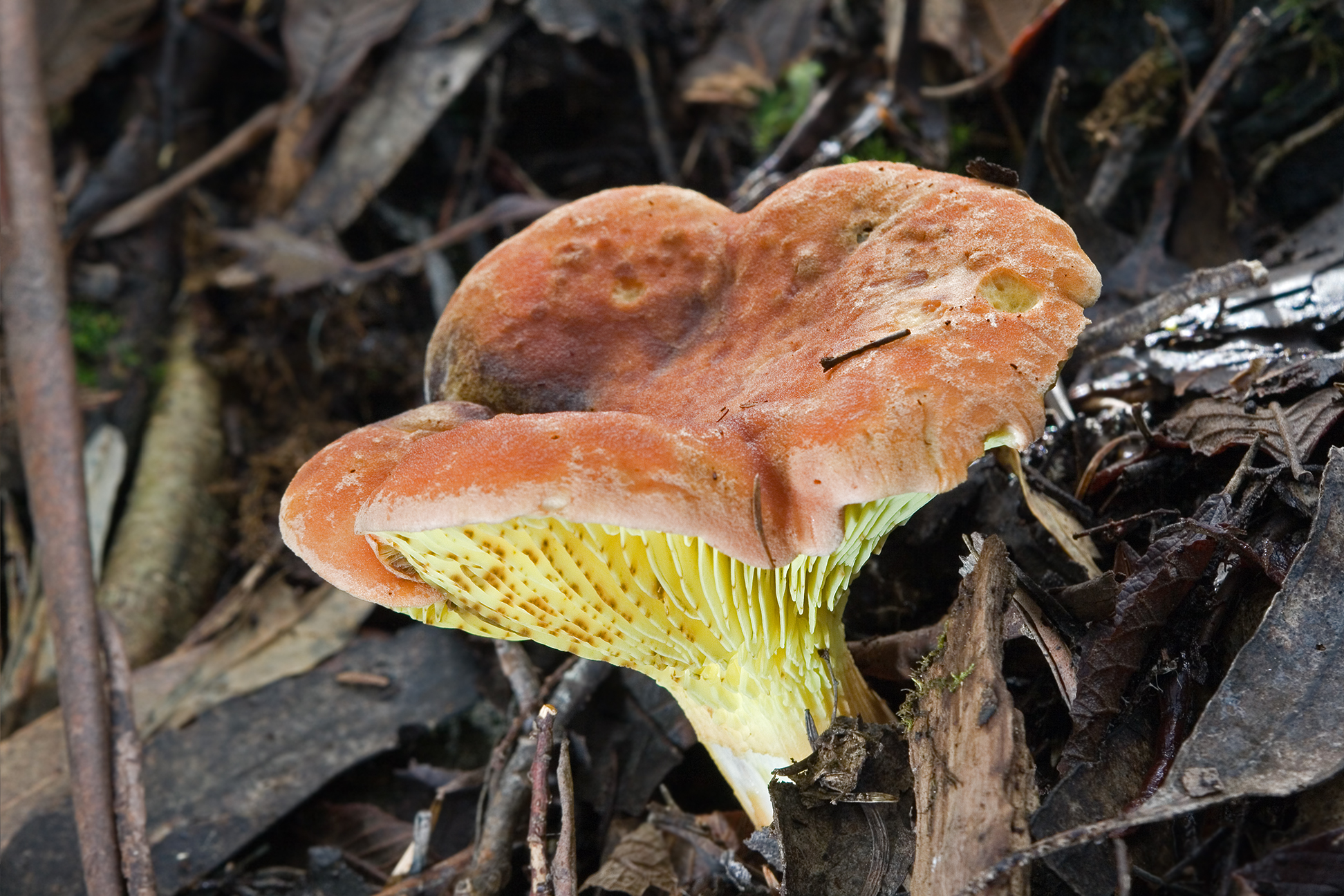
- Phylloporus rhodoxanthus

Scientific classification
- Kingdom: Fungi
- Division: Basidiomycota
- Class: Agaricomycetes
- Order: Boletales
- Family: Boletaceae
- Genus: Phylloporus; Quél. (1888)

Type species
- Phylloporus pelletieri (Lév.) Quél. (1888)

Species
- ~ 50, see text

= Phylloporus =

Genus of fungi

Phylloporus is a genus of fungi in the family Boletaceae (suborder Boletineae). The genus has a cosmopolitan distribution, and contains about 50 species, mostly in tropical areas.

== Species ==
- Phylloporus albocarnosus Heinem.
- Phylloporus alborufus M.A. Neves & Halling
- Phylloporus ampliporus Heinem. & Rammeloo
- Phylloporus arenicola A.H. Sm. & Trappe
- Phylloporus ater (Beeli) Heinem.
- Phylloporus attenuatus Iqbal Hosen
- Phylloporus aurantiacus Halling & G.M. Muell.
- Phylloporus australiensis Watling
- Phylloporus bellus (Massee) Corner
- Phylloporus bogoriensis Höhn.
- Phylloporus boletinoides A.H. Sm. & Thiers
- Phylloporus borneensis Corner
- Phylloporus brunneiceps N.K.Zeng, Zhu L.Yang & L.P.Tang
- Phylloporus brunneolus Corner
- Phylloporus caballeroi Singer
- Phylloporus carmineus Heinem.
- Phylloporus castanopsidis M.A. Neves & Halling
- Phylloporus catenulatus Iqbal Hosen & T.H. Li
- Phylloporus centroamericanus Singer & L.D. Gómez
- Phylloporus cingulatus Corner
- Phylloporus clelandii Watling
- Phylloporus coccineus Corner
- Phylloporus cyanescens (Corner) M.A. Neves & Halling
- Phylloporus depressus Heinem.
- Phylloporus dimorphus M.A. Neves & Halling
- Phylloporus fibulatus Singer
- Phylloporus flavidulus Corner
- Phylloporus flavipes Rick
- Phylloporus foliiporus (Murrill) Singer
- Phylloporus gajari Iqbal Hosen & T.H. Li
- Phylloporus gomphidioides Heinem. & Rammeloo
- Phylloporus guanacastensis L.D. Gómez
- Phylloporus guzmanii Montoya & Bandala
- Phylloporus gymnocystis Singer, Fieldiana
- Phylloporus hyperion (Cooke & Massee) Singer
- Phylloporus imbricatus N.K.Zeng, Zhu L.Yang & L.P.Tang
- Phylloporus incarnatus Corner
- Phylloporus infundibuliformis (Cleland) Singer
- Phylloporus infuscatus M.A. Neves & Halling
- Phylloporus lariceti Singer
- Phylloporus leucomycelinus (Singer & M.H. Ivory) Singer
- Phylloporus luteobasalis Heinem. & Rammeloo
- Phylloporus maculatus N.K.Zeng, Zhu L.Yang & L.P.Tang
- Phylloporus manausensis Singer
- Phylloporus nigrescens Heinem. & Rammeloo
- Phylloporus novae-zelandiae McNabb
- Phylloporus ochraceobrunneus Corner
- Phylloporus orientalis Corner
- Phylloporus orientalis var. brevisporus Corner
- Phylloporus pachycystidiatus N.K.Zeng, Zhu L.Yang & L.P.Tang
- Phylloporus paradoxus (Kalchbr.) Cleland
- Phylloporus parvisporus Corner
- Phylloporus pelletieri (Lév.) Quél.
- Phylloporus phaeosporus Corner
- Phylloporus phaeoxanthus Singer & L.D. Gómez

- Phylloporus phaeoxanthus var. simplex Singer & L.D. Gómez

- Phylloporus pratensis Rick
- Phylloporus pseudopaxillus Heinem. & Rammeloo
- Phylloporus pumilus M.A. Neves & Halling
- Phylloporus purpurellus Singer
- Phylloporus purpureus (Beeli) Heinem.

- Phylloporus purpureus var. ambiguus Heinem.

- Phylloporus quercophilus Montoya, Bandala & Garay 2019
- Phylloporus rhodophaeus Heinem. & Rammeloo
- Phylloporus rhodoxanthus (Schwein.) Bresadola
- Phylloporus rimosus Bandala, Montoya & Garay 2019
- Phylloporus rubeolus N.K.Zeng, Zhu L.Yang & L.P.Tang
- Phylloporus rubiginosus M.A. Neves & Halling
- Phylloporus rubriceps Corner
- Phylloporus rubrosquamosus N.K.Zeng, Zhu L.Yang & L.P.Tang
- Phylloporus rufescens Corner
- Phylloporus scabripes Ortiz & Neves
- Phylloporus squamosus Corner
- Phylloporus stenosporus Corner
- Phylloporus sulphureus (Berk.) Singer
- Phylloporus testaceus Heinem. & Gooss.-Font.

- Phylloporus testaceus var. bisporus Heinem.

- Phylloporus tubipes Heinem.
- Phylloporus tunicatus Corner
- Phylloporus veluticeps (Cooke & Massee) Pegler & Young
- Phylloporus viridis (Berk.) Singer
- Phylloporus yunnanensis N.K.Zeng, Zhu L.Yang & L.P.Tang
