= Phylloporus alborufus =

Scientific classification
- Domain: Eukaryota
- Kingdom: Fungi
- Division: Basidiomycota
- Class: Agaricomycetes
- Order: Boletales
- Family: Boletaceae
- Genus: Phylloporus
- Species: P. alborufus

Binomial name
- Phylloporus alborufus M.A.Neves & Halling (2010)

Species of fungus

Phylloporus alborufus is a species of fungus in the family Boletaceae. It was first described as a new species in 2010.
