= Phylloporus attenuatus =

Scientific classification
- Kingdom: Fungi
- Division: Basidiomycota
- Class: Agaricomycetes
- Order: Boletales
- Family: Boletaceae
- Genus: Phylloporus
- Species: P. attenuatus

Binomial name
- Phylloporus attenuatus Iqbal Hosen (2017)

Species of fungus

Phylloporus attenuatus is a species of the fungal family Boletaceae. It was first described as a new species in 2017 from Bangladesh. This fungus is putatively associated with Shorea robusta.
