= Phylloporus hyperion =

Scientific classification
- Domain: Eukaryota
- Kingdom: Fungi
- Division: Basidiomycota
- Class: Agaricomycetes
- Order: Boletales
- Family: Boletaceae
- Genus: Phylloporus
- Species: P. hyperion

Binomial name
- Phylloporus hyperion (Cooke & Massee) Singer

Species of fungus

Phylloporus hyperion is a species of fungus in the family Boletaceae.
