= Phylloporus veluticeps =

Scientific classification
- Domain: Eukaryota
- Kingdom: Fungi
- Division: Basidiomycota
- Class: Agaricomycetes
- Order: Boletales
- Family: Boletaceae
- Genus: Phylloporus
- Species: P. veluticeps

Binomial name
- Phylloporus veluticeps (Cooke & Massee) Pegler & T.W.K.Young (1981)

Synonyms
- Agaricus veluticeps Cooke & Massee (1889); Panaeolus veluticeps Sacc. (1891); Flammula veluticeps (Cooke & Massee) Singer (1951); Paxillus veluticeps (Cooke & Massee) Singer (1955)

Species of fungus

Phylloporus veluticeps is a species of fungus in the family Boletaceae.
