= Phylloporus gajari =

Scientific classification
- Domain: Eukaryota
- Kingdom: Fungi
- Division: Basidiomycota
- Class: Agaricomycetes
- Order: Boletales
- Family: Boletaceae
- Genus: Phylloporus
- Species: P. gajari

Binomial name
- Phylloporus gajari Iqbal Hosen & T.H.Li (2015)

Species of fungus

Phylloporus gajari is a species of the fungal family Boletaceae. It was first described as a new species in 2015 from Bangladesh. This fungus is putatively associated with Shorea robusta.
