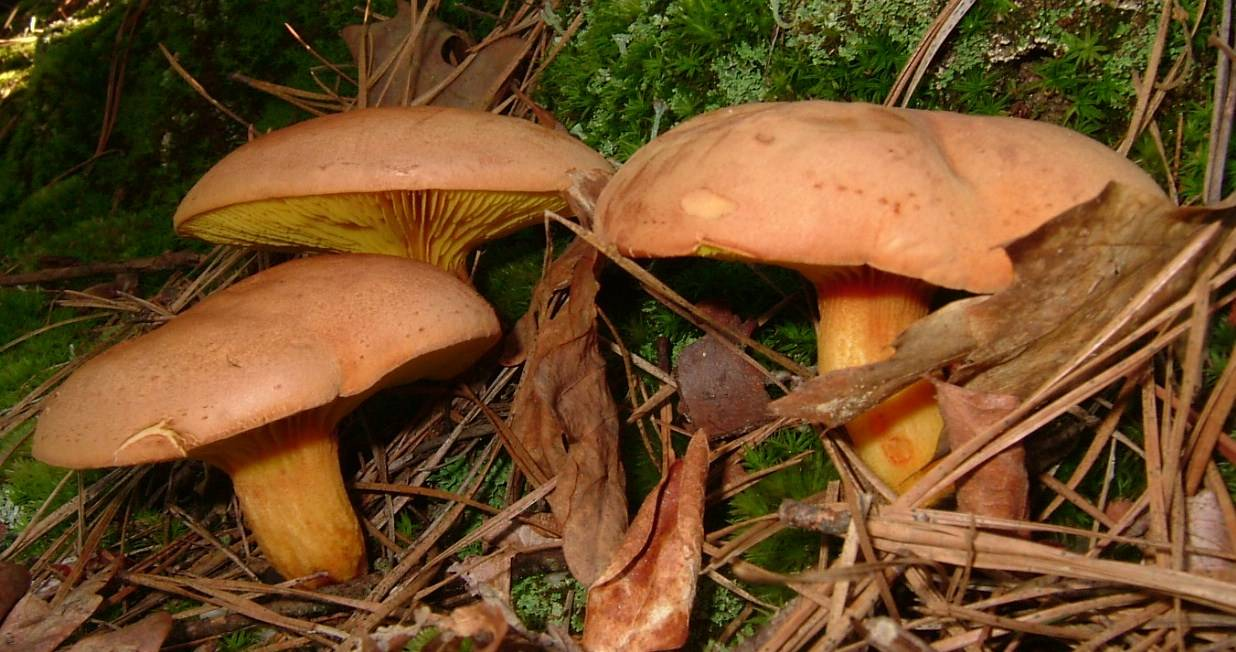

Scientific classification
- Kingdom: Fungi
- Division: Basidiomycota
- Class: Agaricomycetes
- Order: Boletales
- Family: Boletaceae
- Genus: Phylloporus
- Species: P. rhodoxanthus

Binomial name
- Phylloporus rhodoxanthus (Schwein.) Bres. (1900)

Synonyms
- Agaricus rhodoxanthus Schwein. (1822)

= Phylloporus rhodoxanthus =

Species of fungus

Phylloporus rhodoxanthus
- Mycological characteristics
- Gills on hymenium
- Cap is convex or flat
- Hymenium is adnate or decurrent
- Stipe is bare
- Spore print is brown to yellow
- Ecology is mycorrhizal
- Edibility is edible

Phylloporus rhodoxanthus, commonly known as the gilled bolete, is a species of fungus in the family Boletaceae. Like other species in the genus, it has a lamellate (gilled) hymenium and forms a mycorrhizal association with the roots of living trees, specifically beech and oak in North and Central America. It is edible.

== Taxonomy ==
The species was first described from North Carolina as Agaricus rhodoxanthus by Lewis David de Schweinitz in 1822. Giacomo Bresadola transferred it to Phylloporus in 1900.

== Description ==
The cap is initially convex before flattening out in age, sometimes developing a central depression; it attains diameters of 2–12 cm (3/4–4 3/4 in). The cap margin is initially curved inward. The cap surface is dry, with a somewhat velvet-like texture, and often develops cracks in maturity that reveal the pale yellow flesh underneath. Its color ranges from dull red to reddish brown, to reddish yellow, or olive brown. The flesh has no distinct taste or odor. The gills are decurrent to somewhat decurrent, and well-spaced. They are deep yellow, staining greenish to brownish, often wrinkled, and usually with cross-veins in the spaces between the gills, sometimes giving the gills a somewhat pore-like appearance.

The cylindrical stem measures 4–10 cm (1 1/2–4 in) long by 7.5 cm (3 in) thick and is often tapered toward the base. The stem is firm and solid (i.e., not hollow), and yellow, with yellow mycelium at the base. It frequently has longitudinal grooves extending down from the gills.

The spore print is olivaecous yellow-brown. The spores are elliptical to spindle-shaped, smooth, and measure 9–14 by 3.5–5 μm.

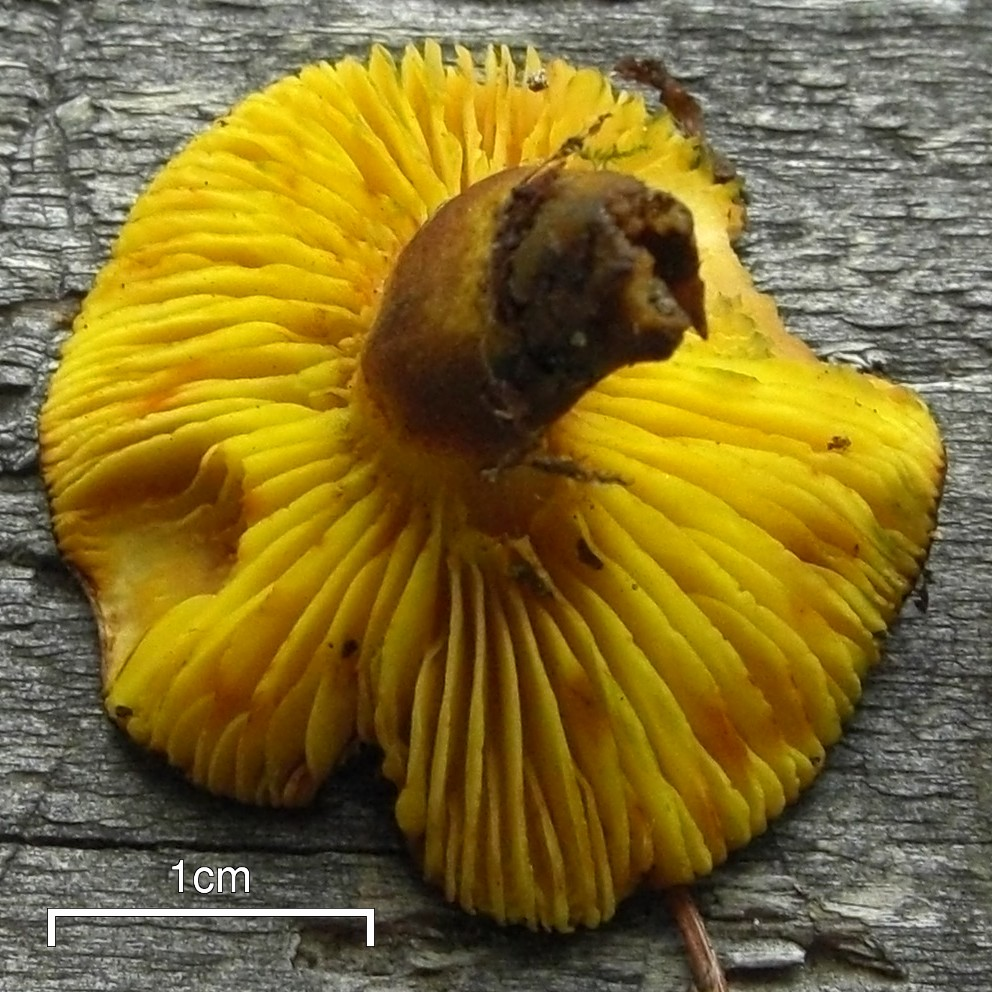
The yellow gills

=== Similar species ===
In North America, the species can be confused with: P. leucomycelinus, distinguished by the presence of white mycelium at the base of its stem; P. arenicola, associated with pines in western North America; P. boletinoides, present in southern North America and having a subporoid, olive-yellow hymenium; and P. foliiporus, also present in southern North America and microscopically distinguished by the presence of cystidia.

== Distribution and ecology ==
The fruit bodies grow on the ground singly or in small groups in deciduous forests of oak and beech. The species has a wide distribution in North America, where it fruits from July to October, and has also been reported from Belize. The name was formerly applied to Phylloporus species from Asia (China, India, and Taiwan), Australia, and Europe, but more recent research has shown that these non-American records refer to different species.

Adults of the pleasing fungus beetle Tritoma biguttata affinis have been recorded from this mushroom, but it does not seem to be a regular food source for them.

== Uses ==
The fruit bodies are edible and considered good by some. The flavor has been described as "tender and nutty", and drying the fruit bodies first enhances the flavor. Suitable culinary uses include sauteing, adding to sauces or stuffings, or raw as a colorful garnish. They are also used by hobbyists to make mushroom dyes of beige, greenish beige, or gold colors, depending on the mordant used.

== See also ==
- List of North American boletes
